= Grande Armée =

Field army of the French Imperial Army

Great Army
- Grande Armée
- Emblem of Napoleon
- Active: 1804–1808; 1812; 1813–1814
- Country: First French Empire
- Allegiance: Napoleon I
- Branch: French Imperial Army
- Type: Field army
- Size: 600,000 men at peak strength in 1812 (before the invasion of Russia) out of 2,175,335 men conscripted in total from 1805 to 1813 in the broader French Imperial Army
- Motto: Valeur et Discipline
- Colors: Le Tricolore
- Engagements: War of the Third Coalition; War of the Fourth Coalition; Russian campaign War of the Sixth Coalition

Commanders
- Supreme commander: Napoleon I
- Notable commanders: Pierre Augereau; Jean-Baptiste Bernadotte; Louis-Alexandre Berthier; Jean-Baptiste Bessières; Guillaume Brune; Louis-Nicolas Davout; Emmanuel de Grouchy; Jean-Baptiste Jourdan; François Christophe de Kellermann; Jean Lannes; François Joseph Lefebvre; Étienne MacDonald; Auguste de Marmont; André Masséna; Bon-Adrien Jeannot de Moncey; Édouard Mortier; Joachim Murat; Michel Ney; Nicolas Oudinot; Claude-Victor Perrin; Catherine-Dominique de Pérignon; Józef Antoni Poniatowski; Laurent de Gouvion Saint-Cyr; Jean-Mathieu-Philibert Sérurier; Jean-de-Dieu Soult; Louis-Gabriel Suchet

Insignia
- Ranks: Ranks of the French Imperial Army

The Grande Armée (pronounced [ɡʁɑ̃d aʁme]; French for 'Great Army') was the primary field army of the French Imperial Army during the Napoleonic Wars. Commanded by Napoleon, from 1804 to 1812 it won a series of military victories that allowed the First French Empire to exercise unprecedented control over most of Europe. Widely acknowledged to be one of the greatest fighting forces ever assembled, it ultimately suffered catastrophic losses during the disastrous French invasion of Russia, after which it never recovered its strategic superiority. The Hundred Days in 1815 which culminated in the total defeat of France, put a permanent end to its campaigns.

The Grande Armée was formed in 1804 from the Armée des côtes de l'Océan (Army of the Ocean Coasts), more commonly referred to as the Armée d'Angleterre (Army of England), the French field army of over 100,000 men Napoleon had assembled for his planned invasion of the United Kingdom. He subsequently led the field army to Central Europe in the War of the Third Coalition, which culminated in the defeat of Austrian and Russian forces; soon followed by the War of the Fourth Coalition, which brought about the subjugation of the Kingdom of Prussia. Upon its formation, it consisted of six corps led by Napoleon's marshals and senior generals. When the Austrian and Russian armies began their preparations to invade France in late 1805, the Grande Armée was quickly ordered across the Rhine into southern Germany, leading to Napoleon's victories at Ulm and Austerlitz.

The French Imperial Army grew as Napoleon seized power across Europe, recruiting troops from occupied and allied nations; it reached its peak of one million men at the start of the Russian campaign in 1812, with the Grande Armée itself reaching its height of 413,000 French soldiers and about 600,000 men overall when including foreign recruits. While the term originally designated the primary field army and operational core of Napoleon’s forces, it became often used in historiography—notably in anglophone countries—to refer to the transnational armies in general Napoleon ended up leading in his campaigns. Furthermore, during the War of the Fifth Coalition and the Waterloo campaign (part of the Hundred Days), other formations were led by him de facto, namely the Army of Germany and the Army of the North.

The Grande Armée was known for its innovative formations, tactics, logistics and communications. While international contingents that it later came to integrate were commanded by French generals—with the exception of the Polish and Austrian ones—soldiers could climb the ranks regardless of class, wealth, or national origin, unlike what was custom in Europe in this era.

After being initially deployed in the Peninsular War as Napoleon personally entered and led the campaign in late 1808 following shortcomings of the newly-assembled Armée d'Espagne (Army of Spain) tasked with subduing Spain, the Grande Armée and their leader left Spain in early 1809 due to renewed Austrian threat. Although once again defeated, the Austrians fared better in the War of the Fifth Coalition, with Napoleon losing a non-negligible portion of his most experienced troops, as well as some of the most esteemed French commanders in this campaign, somewhat eroding the French army's mythos of invincibility.

In the summer of 1812, while as many as 300,000 French troops of the Armée d'Espagne were entangled in the Peninsular War, Napoleon opened a second war front as the Grande Armée marched east to subjugate Russia. The Russians fell back with its approach. After the capture of Smolensk and tactical victory at Borodino, the French reached Moscow on 14 September 1812. However, the army was already drastically reduced by skirmishes with the Russians, disease (principally typhus), desertion, heat, exhaustion, and long communication lines. The army spent a month in Moscow but was ultimately forced to march back westward. Cold, starvation, and disease, as well as constant harassment by Cossacks and Russian partisans, resulted in the Grande Armée's utter destruction as a fighting force.

Only 120,000 men survived the Russian campaign (excluding early deserters); of these, 50,000 were Austrians, Prussians, and other Germans, 20,000 were Poles, and just 35,000 were French. As many as 380,000 died in the campaign. Napoleon led a new army during the campaign in Germany in 1813 and the defense of France in 1814 as part of the War of the Sixth Coalition, and the Waterloo campaign in 1815, but the Grande Armée would never regain its height of June 1812, and France would find itself invaded on multiple fronts from the Spanish border to the German border. Eventually Napoleonic France would be ultimately defeated by Treaty of Paris (1815). In total, from 1805 to 1813, over 2.1 million Frenchmen were conscripted into the Imperial Army. Estimates for French military deaths during the Napoleonic Wars (1803–1815) generally range between 700,000 and 1.8 million, with many modern historians placing the likely figure around one million.

== History ==
For a history of the French Army in the period of 1792–1804 during the wars of the First and Second Coalitions see French Revolutionary Army.

=== 1804–1806 ===
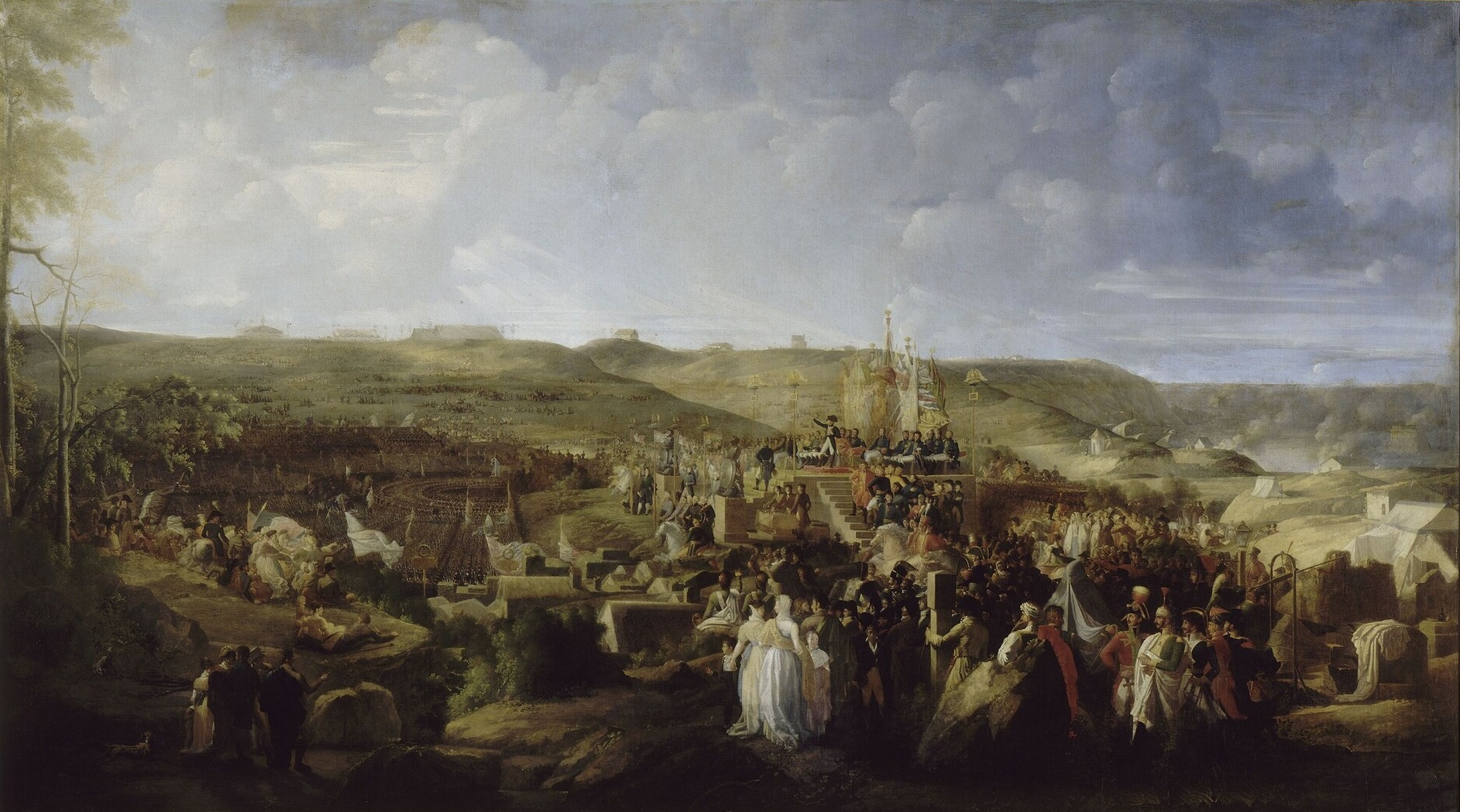
Napoleon Distributing the Legion of Honour at the Camp of Boulogne by Philippe-Auguste Hennequin. Napoleon is shown at the Camp of Boulogne on August 16, 1804

The Grande Armée was originally formed as L'Armée des côtes de l'Océan (Army of the Ocean Coasts) intended for the invasion of Britain, at the port of Boulogne in 1804. Following Napoleon's coronation as Emperor of the French in 1804, the Third Coalition was formed against France and the Grande Armée turned its sights eastwards in 1805. The army left Boulogne in late August and through rapid marches, surrounded General Karl von Mack's isolated Austrian Army at the fortress of Ulm. The Ulm campaign, as it came to be known, resulted in 60,000 Austrian prisoners at the cost of just 2,000 French soldiers. By November, Vienna was taken but Austria refused to capitulate, maintaining an army in the field. In addition, its ally Russia had yet to commit to action. The war would continue for a while longer. Affairs were decisively settled on 2 December 1805 at the Battle of Austerlitz, where the numerically inferior Grande Armée routed a combined Russo-Austrian army led by Russian Emperor Alexander I. The stunning victory led to the Treaty of Pressburg on 26 December 1805, with the dissolution of the Holy Roman Empire the following year.

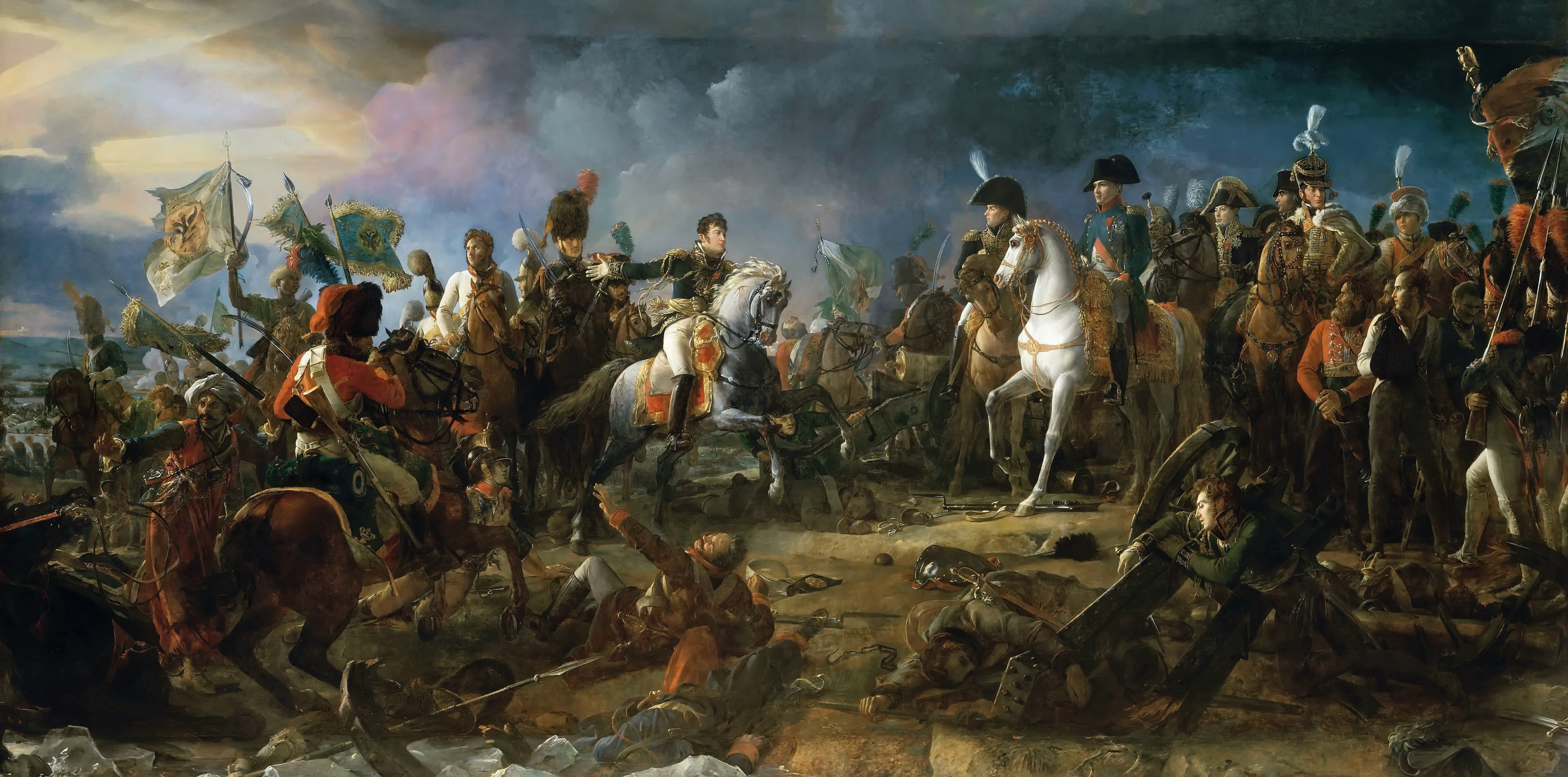
The Battle of Austerlitz, 2nd December 1805, by François Gérard

The alarming increase of French power in Central Europe disturbed Prussia, which had remained neutral the previous year. After much diplomatic wrangling, Prussia secured promises of Russian military aid and the Fourth Coalition against France came into being in 1806. The Grande Armée advanced into Prussian territory with the famed bataillon-carré (battalion square) system, whereby corps marched in close supporting distances and became vanguards, rearguards, or flank forces as the situation demanded, and decisively defeated the Prussians at Jena and Auerstedt, both fought on 14 October 1806. After a legendary pursuit, the French took 140,000 prisoners and killed and wounded roughly 25,000. Marshal Louis-Nicolas Davout's III Corps, the victors at Auerstedt, received the honours of marching into Berlin first. Once more, the French had defeated an enemy before its allies could arrive, and once more, this did not bring peace.

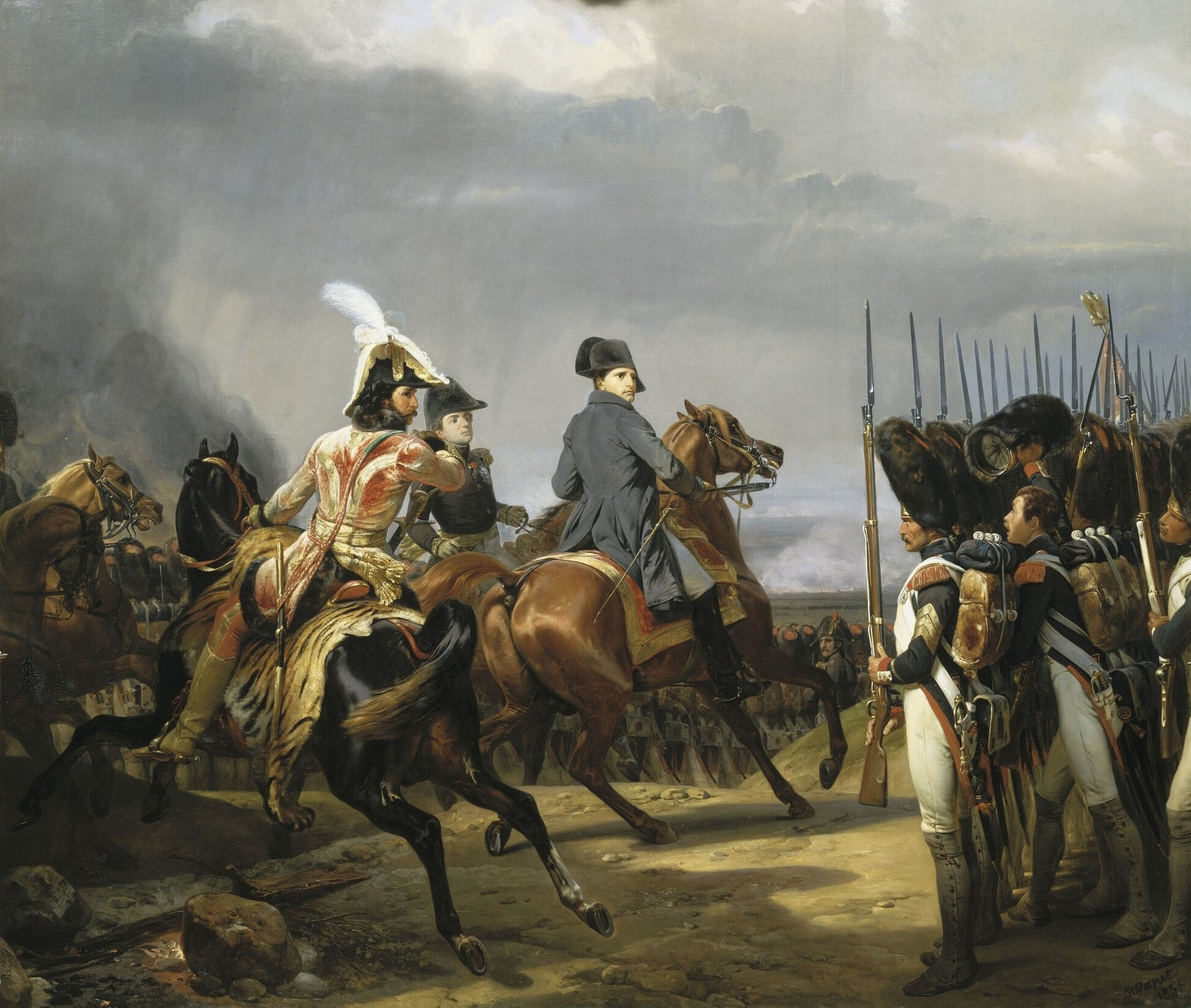
Napoleon reviewing the Imperial Guard at the Battle of Jena, 14 October 1806

=== 1807–1808 ===
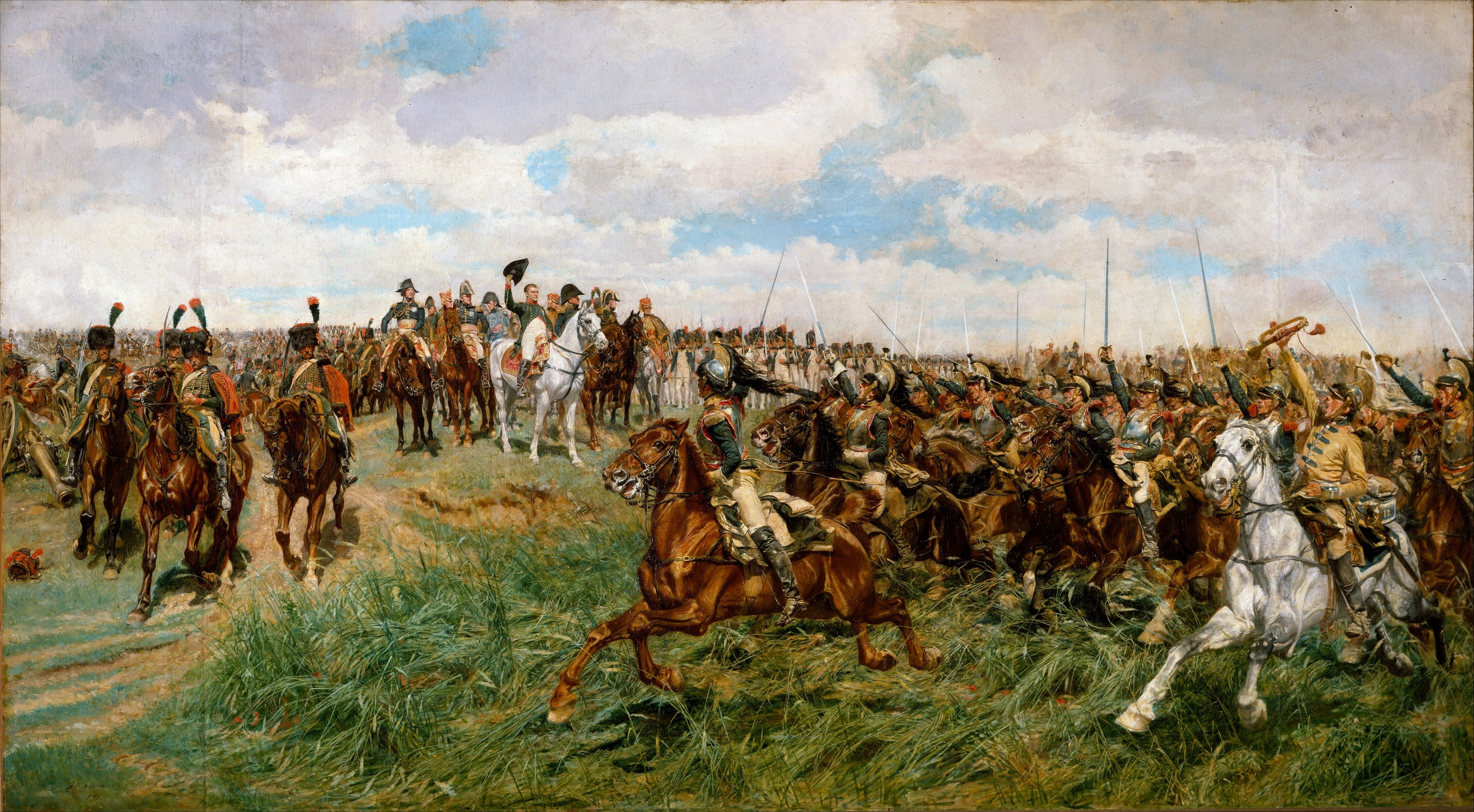
Charge of the French cuirassiers at Friedland (1807), by Ernest Meissonier

Napoleon now turned his attentions to Poland, where the remaining Prussian armies were linking up with their Russian allies. A difficult winter campaign produced nothing but a stalemate, made worse by the Battle of Eylau on 7–8 February 1807, where Russian and French casualties soared for little gain. The campaign resumed in the spring and this time General Levin August von Bennigsen's Russian army was soundly defeated at the Battle of Friedland on 14 June 1807. This victory brought about the Treaties of Tilsit between France, Russia, and Prussia in July, leaving Napoleon with no enemies on the continent.

The Grande Armée was dissolved in October 1808 and its constituents formed into the Army of Spain and the Army of the Rhine, which in 1809 was reorganized into the Army of Germany.

=== 1810–1812 ===
With the exception of Spain, a three-year lull ensued. Diplomatic tensions with Russia, however, became so acute that they eventually led to war in 1812. Napoleon assembled the largest field army he had ever commanded to deal with this menace. On 24 June 1812, shortly before the invasion, the assembled troops with a total strength of 685,000 men were made up of:

• 410,000 from the French Empire (present-day France, Italy, the Low Countries, and several German states)
• ~95,000-120,000 (estimated) Poles
• 35,000 Austrians
• 30,000 Italians
• 24,000 Bavarians
• 20,000 Saxons
• 20,000 Prussians
• 17,000 Westphalians
• 15,000 Swiss
• 10,000 Danes and Norwegians
• 4,000 Spaniards
• 4,000 Portuguese
• 3,500 Croats
• 2,000 Irish

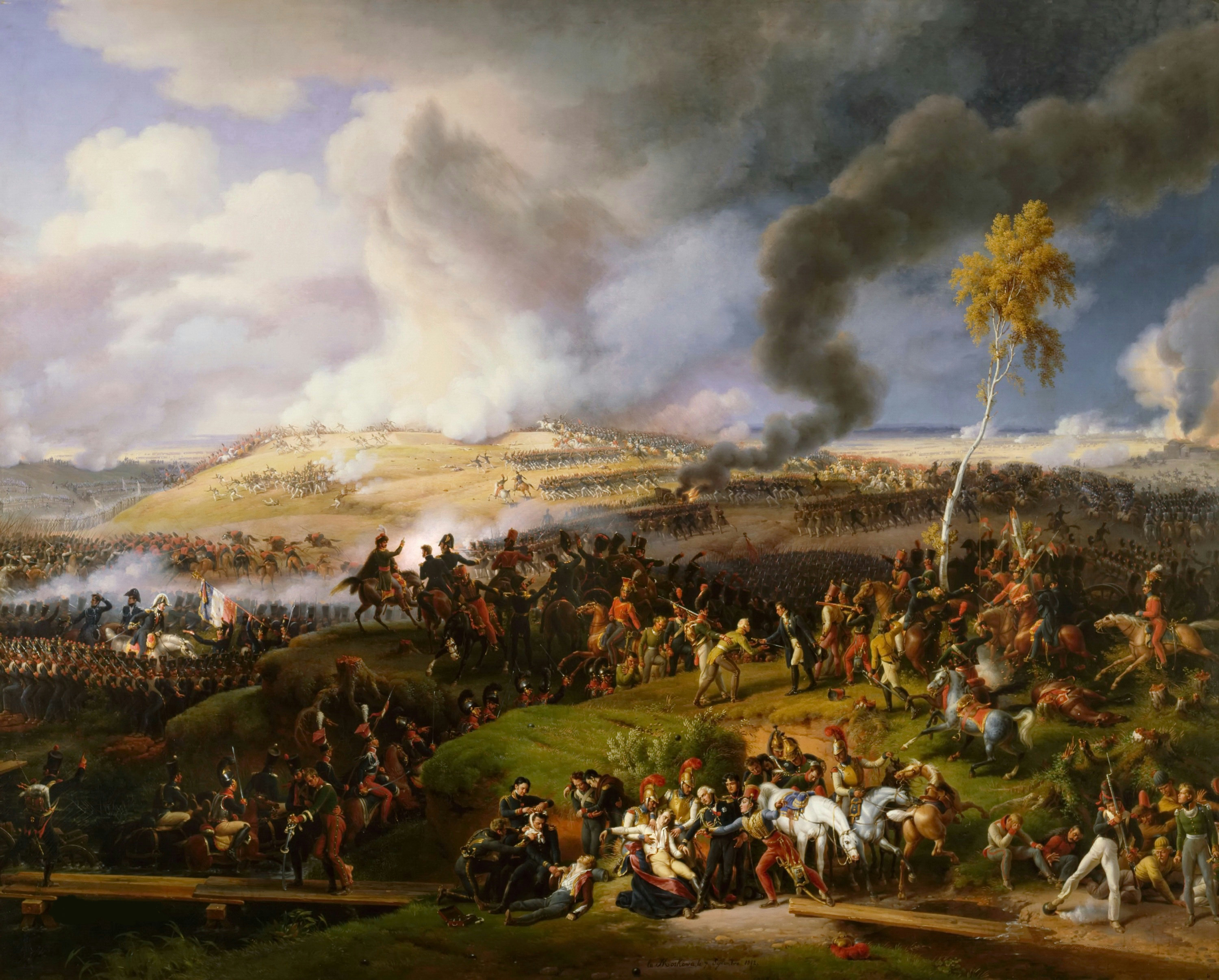
The Battle of Moscow by Louis-François Lejeune. The Battle of Borodino was the bloodiest single-day battle of the Napoleonic Wars.

The new Grande Armée was somewhat different from before; over one-third of its ranks were now filled by non-French conscripts coming from satellite states or countries allied to France. The behemoth force crossed the Niemen River on 24 June 1812, and Napoleon hoped that quick marching could place his men between the two main Russian armies, commanded by Generals Barclay de Tolly and Pyotr Bagration. However, the campaign was characterized by many frustrations, as the Russians succeeded no fewer than three times in evading Napoleon's pincers. A final stand for the defence of Moscow led to the massive Battle of Borodino on 7 September 1812. There the Grande Armée won a bloody but indecisive and arguably pyrrhic victory. A week after the battle, the Grande Armée finally entered Moscow only to find the city largely empty and ablaze. Its soldiers were now forced to deal with the fires while hunting down arsonists and guarding the city's historic districts. Napoleon and his army spent over a month in Moscow, vainly hoping that the Russian emperor would respond to the French peace offers. After these efforts failed, the French set out on 19 October, now only a shadow of their former selves. The epic retreat over the Russian winter dominates popular conceptions of the war, even though over half of the Grande Armée had been lost during the summer. The French were harassed repeatedly by the converging Russian armies, Marshal Michel Ney even conducting a rearguard separation between his troops and the Russians, and by the time the Berezina was reached Napoleon only had about 49,000 troops and 40,000 stragglers of little military value. The resulting battle and the monumental work of General Jean Baptiste Eblé's engineers saved the remnants of the Grande Armée. Napoleon left his men in order to reach Paris and address new military and political matters. Of the 685,000 men that constituted the initial invasion force, only 93,000 survived.

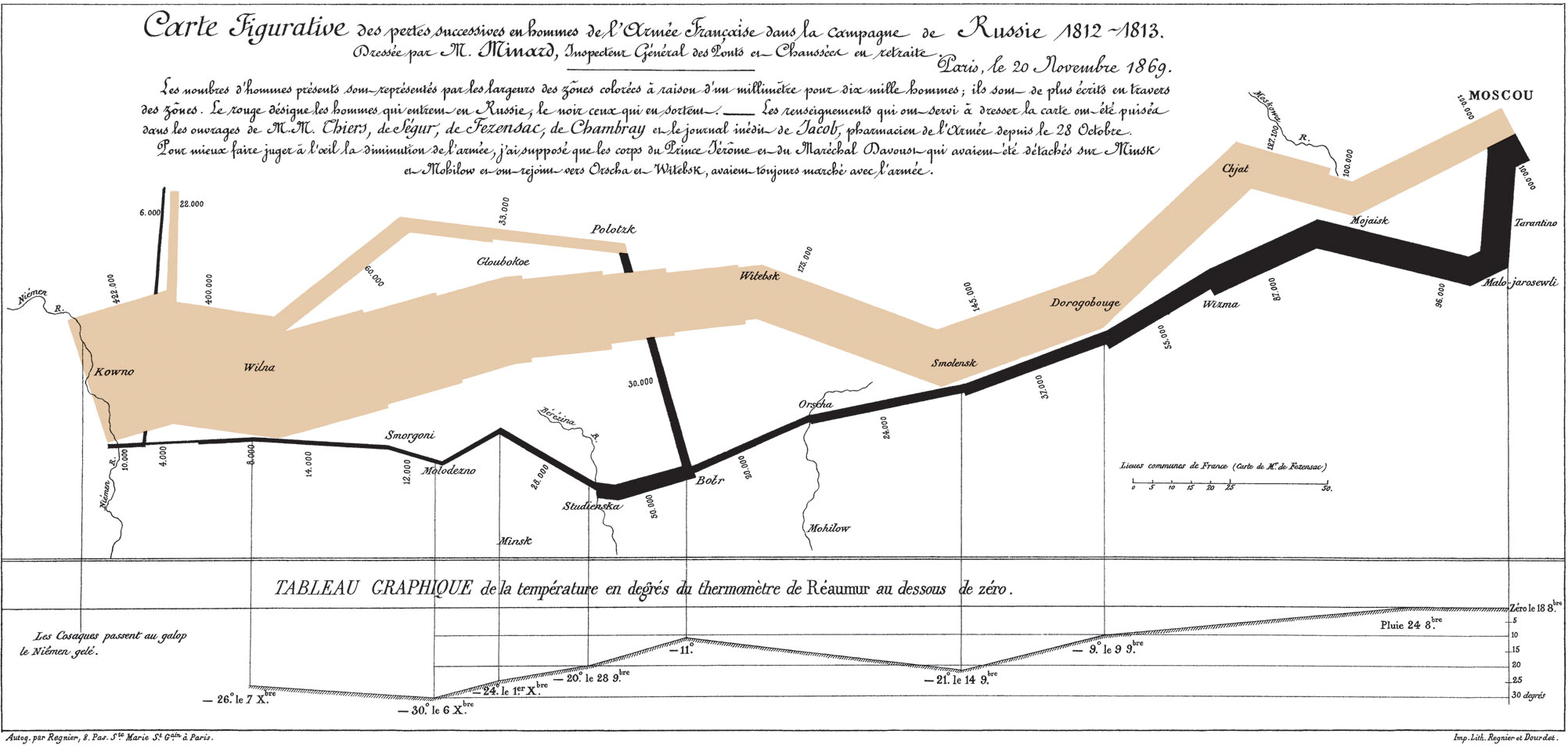
Charles Joseph Minard's graph showing the decreasing size of the Grande Armée as it marches to Moscow (brown line, from left to right) and back (black line, from right to left) with the size of the army equal to the width of the line. Temperature is plotted on the lower graph for the return journey (multiply Réaumur temperatures by 1¼ to get Celsius, e.g. −30 °R = −37.5 °C)

=== 1813–1815 ===
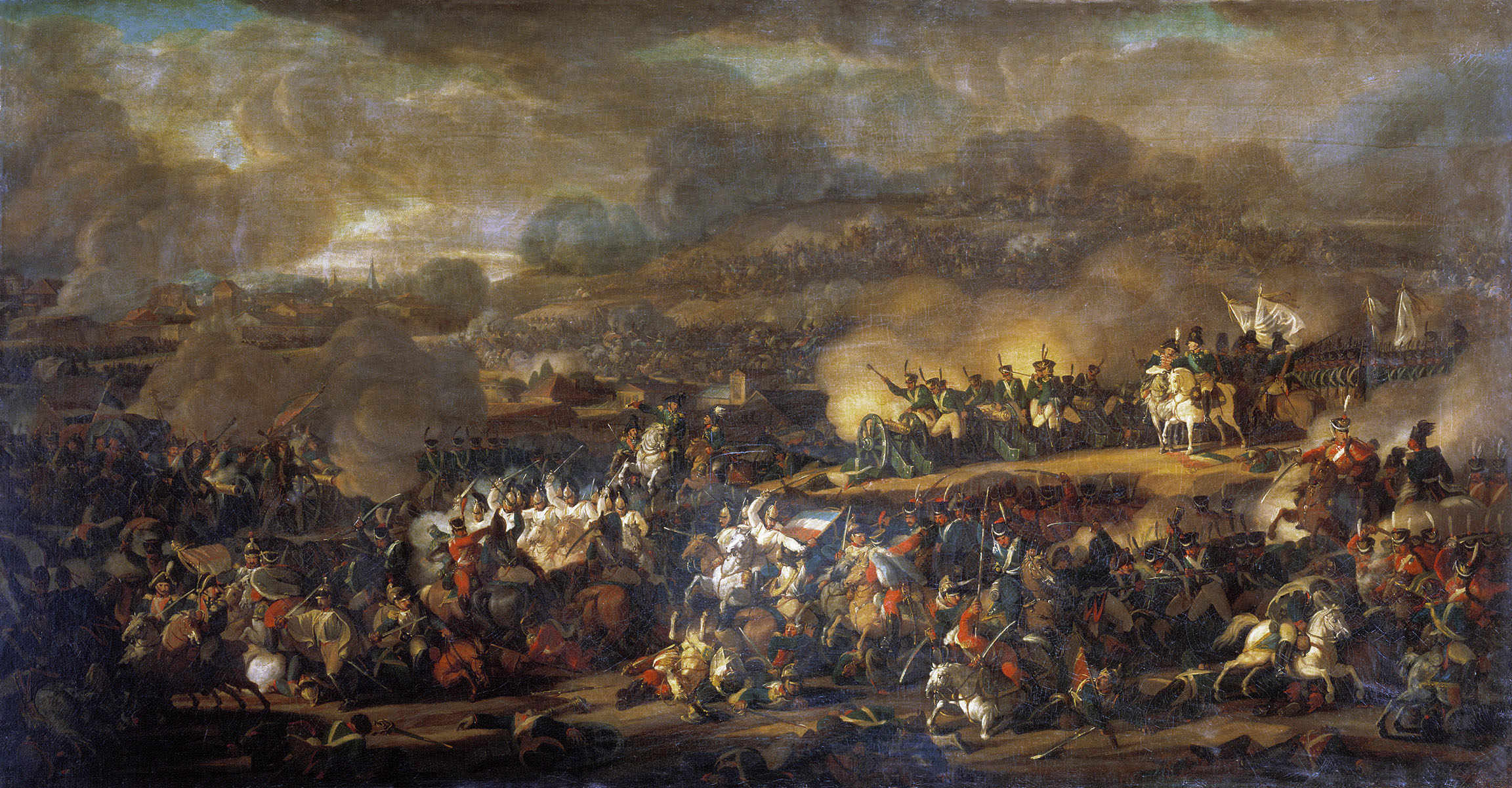
The Battle of Leipzig involved over half a million soldiers, making it the largest battle in Europe prior to World War I.

The catastrophe in Russia now emboldened anti-French sentiments throughout Europe. The Sixth Coalition was formed and Germany became the centrepiece of the upcoming campaign. With customary genius, Napoleon raised new armies and opened up the campaign with a series of victories at Lützen and Bautzen. But due to the poor quality of French troops and cavalry following the Russian campaign, along with miscalculations by certain subordinate marshals, these triumphs were not decisive enough to win the war and only secured an armistice. Napoleon hoped to use this respite to increase the quantity and improve the quality of the Grande Armée, but when Austria joined the Allies, his strategic situation grew bleak. The campaign reopened in August with a significant French victory at the two-day Battle of Dresden. However, the adoption of the Trachenberg Plan by the Allies, which called for avoiding direct conflict with Napoleon and focusing on his subordinates, paid dividends as the French suffered defeats at Großbeeren, the Katzbach, Kulm, and Dennewitz. Growing Allied numbers eventually hemmed the French in at Leipzig, where the three-day Battle of the Nations witnessed a heavy loss for Napoleon when a bridge was prematurely destroyed, abandoning 30,000 French soldiers on the other side of the Elster River. The campaign, however, did end on a victorious note when the French destroyed an isolated Bavarian corps which was trying to block their retreat at Hanau.

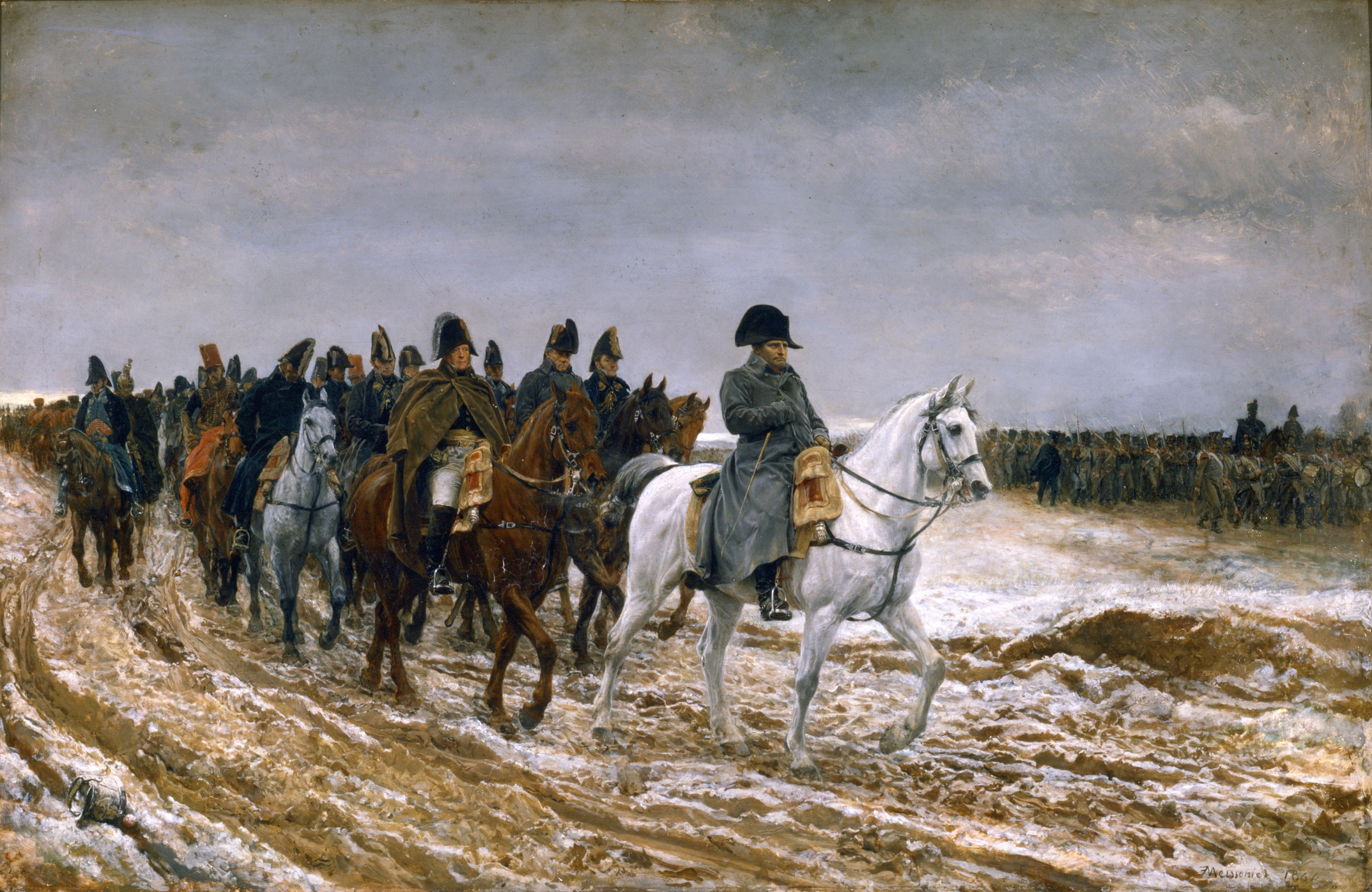
Napoleon and his staff returning from Soissons after the Battle of Laon by Ernest Meissonier, 1864 (Musée d'Orsay)

"The Grand Empire is no more. It is France herself we must now defend", were Napoleon's words to the Senate at the end of 1813. The emperor managed to raise new armies, but strategically he was in a virtually hopeless position. Allied armies were invading from the Pyrenees, across the plains of Northern Italy, and via France's eastern borders as well. The campaign began ominously when Napoleon suffered a defeat at the Battle of La Rothière, but he quickly regained his former spirit. In the Six Days' Campaign of February 1814, the 30,000-man Grande Armée inflicted 20,000 casualties on Field Marshal Gebhard Leberecht von Blücher's scattered corps at a cost of just 2,000 for themselves. They then headed south and defeated Field Marshal Karl von Schwarzenberg's corps at the Battle of Montereau. These victories, however, could not remedy the situation, and French defeats at the Battle of Laon and the Battle of Arcis-sur-Aube dampened moods. At the end of March, Paris fell to the Allies. Napoleon wanted to keep fighting, but his marshals refused, forcing him to abdicate on 6 April 1814.

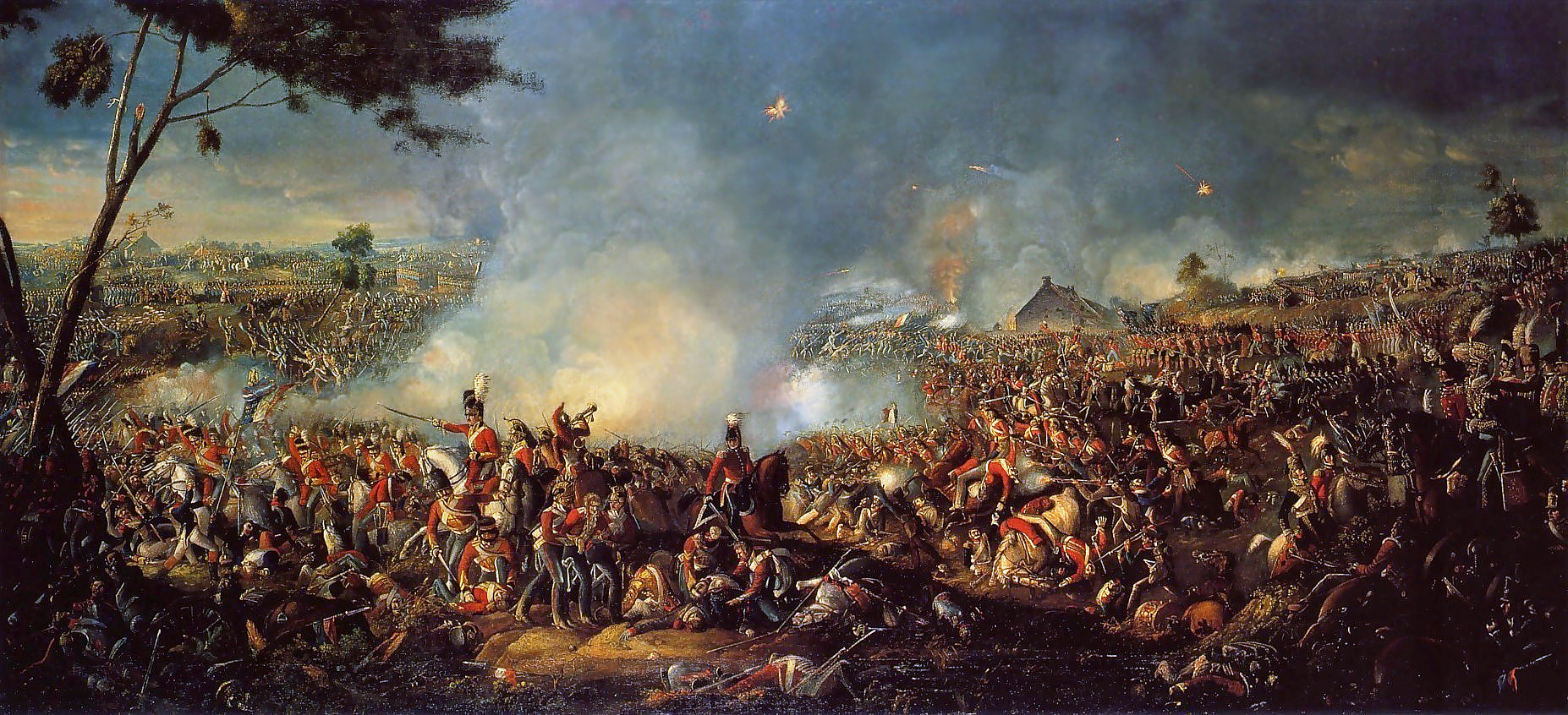
The Battle of Waterloo marked the final defeat of Napoleon and the Grande Armée, as well as the end of the Napoleonic Wars.

After returning from exile on Elba in February 1815, Napoleon busied himself in making a renewed push to secure his empire. For the first time since 1812, the Army of the North he would be commanding for the upcoming campaign was professional and competent. Napoleon hoped to catch and defeat the Allied armies under the Duke of Wellington and Blücher in Belgium before the Russians and Austrians could arrive. The campaign, beginning on 15 June 1815, was initially successful, leading to victory over the Prussians at the Battle of Ligny on 16 June; however, poor staff work, and bad commanders led to many problems for the Grande Armée throughout the entire campaign. Marshal Emmanuel de Grouchy's delayed advance against the Prussians allowed Blücher to rally his men after Ligny and march on to Wellington's aid at the Battle of Waterloo, which resulted in the final, decisive defeat for Napoleon.

== Staff system ==
Prior to the late 18th century, there was generally no organisational support for staff functions such as military intelligence, logistics, planning or personnel. Unit commanders handled such functions for their units, with informal help from subordinates who were usually not trained for or assigned to a specific task.

The first modern use of a General Staff was in the French Revolutionary Wars, when General Louis-Alexandre Berthier (later Marshal) was assigned as Chief of Staff to the Army of Italy in 1795. Berthier was able to establish a well-organised staff support team. Napoleon took over the army the following year and quickly came to appreciate Berthier's system, adopting it for his own headquarters, although Napoleon's usage was limited to his own command group.

The Staff of the Grande Armée was known as the Imperial Headquarters and was divided into two major sections: Napoleon's Military Household and the Army General Headquarters. A third department dependent on the Imperial Headquarters was the office of the Intendant Général (Quartermaster General), providing the administrative staff of the army.

=== Napoleon's Military Household ===
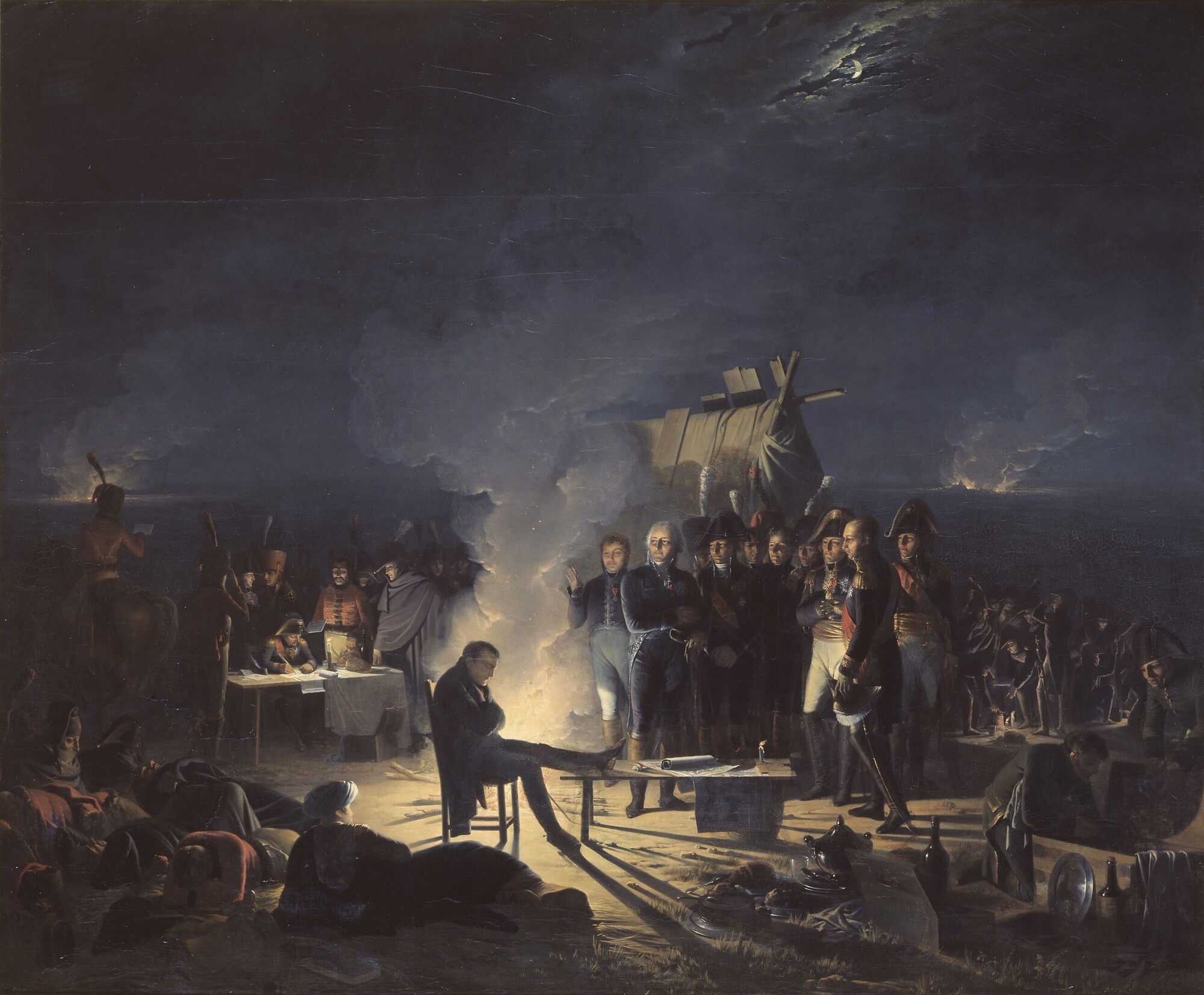
Napoleon's Bivouac on the Battlefield of Wagram by Adolphe Roehn, 1810. Napoleon snatching a moment's rest on the battlefield of Wagram, with his staff and household working around him

The Maison Militaire de l'Empereur (Military Household of the Emperor) was Napoleon's personal military staff and included the department of aides-de-camp (ADCs), orderly officers (until 1809), the Emperor's Cabinet with the Secretariat, a department that collected intelligence about the enemy using spies and the topographical department. Attached was also the Emperor's Civil Cabinet that included the office of the Grand Marshal of the Palace and the Grand Écuyer.

The ADCs to the emperor were mainly loyal, experienced generals or, at times, other senior officers whom he knew from his Italian or Egyptian campaigns. All were known for their bravery and were experts in their own branches of service. Working directly under the supervision of the emperor, these officers were sometimes assigned to temporary command of units or formations or entrusted with diplomatic missions. Most of the time, however, their tasks consisted of making detailed inspection tours and long-distance reconnaissances. When they had to carry orders from the emperor to an army commander, these would be verbal rather than written. The appointment of ADC to the emperor was so influential that they were considered to be "Napoleon's eyes and ears" and even marshals were wise to follow their advice and render them the respect due to their function.

On 29 April 1809, a decree organised their service. Every morning at 0700, the duty ADC and his staff were relieved and the new ADC for the next 24 hours had to present the emperor with a list of names of the staff under his command. This would consist of two supplementary daytime general ADCs and one night ADC, one equerry and (through a rotation system) half the number of orderly officers, half the number of the petits aides de camp (two or three personal ADCs to the general ADCs, who might also be commanded directly by the emperor) and half the number of pages. Their number differed from time to time, but only 37 officers were ever commissioned ADC to the emperor and at normal times their number was restricted to 12. Each of these officers wore the normal general's uniform of his rank, but with gold aiguillettes as the symbol of his function. The appointment of ADC to the emperor did not always last as long as the emperor's reign; an ADC might be given another position such as a field command, a governorship, etc. and would be removed from his ADC status until recalled to that post.

The officiers d'ordonnance (orderly officers) may be considered as junior ADCs, with the rank of chef d'escadron, captain or lieutenant. They, too, were used for special missions such as reconnaissance and inspections, but also to carry written orders. In 1806, when these posts were created, they were members of the Imperial Guard; in 1809, while retaining their military status, they were taken under control of the Grand Écuyer in the Emperor's Civil Household. The decrees regulating their service were signed on 15, 19 and 24 September 1806 and finally on 19 September 1809.

=== Army General Headquarters ===
Alongside the Emperor's Military Household but functioning as a totally independent organisation was the Grand État-Major Général (Army General Headquarters). Since the earliest collaboration of Napoleon and Berthier, its organisation was more or less fixed and it would see only slight changes during the later campaigns of the empire. The Army General Headquarters included the office of the Major-Général's (Chief of Staff's) Cabinet with their four departments: Movements, Secretariat, Accounting and Intelligence (orders of battle). The Major-Général also had his own private Military Staff which included duty Generals and Staff aides-de-camp. Finally there was the Army General Staff with the offices of the three Assistant Major-Generals to the Major-Général.

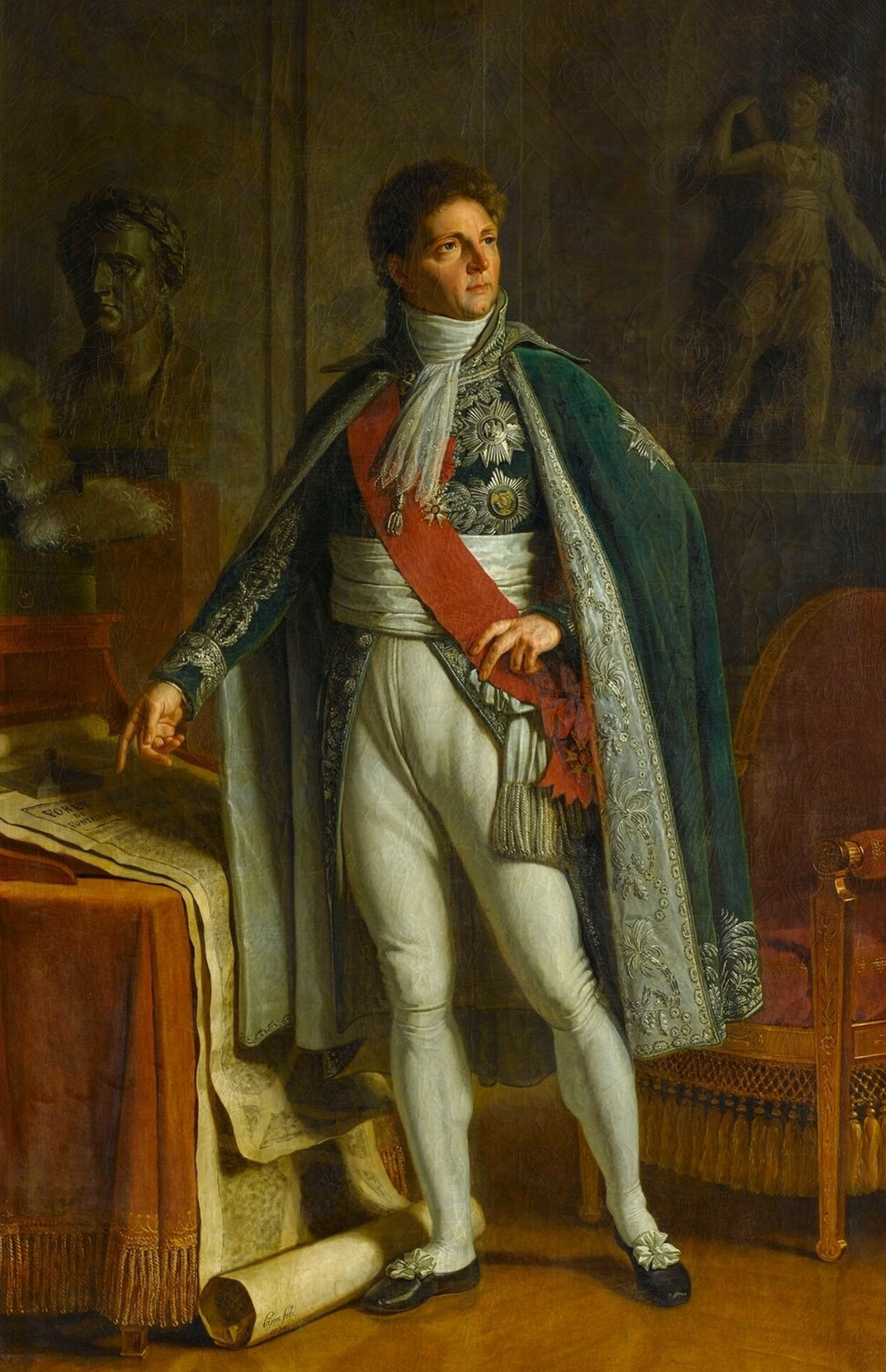
Marshal Louis-Alexandre Berthier acted as Napoleon's chief of staff from 1796 until 1814, being replaced by Marshal Jean-de-Dieu Soult during the Hundred Days.

The role of Chief of Staff in the Grande Armée became almost synonymous with Berthier, who occupied this position in almost all the major campaigns of Napoleon. The General Headquarters was Berthier's unique domain and the emperor respected this demarcation. Its personnel received orders only from Berthier and even Napoleon did not interfere in its immense tasks; he would never walk in on Berthier's private staff while they were writing and copying the orders that he had just given. Since the emperor was his own "operations officer", it can be said that Berthier's job consisted of absorbing Napoleon's strategic intentions, translating them into written orders and transmitting them with the utmost speed and clarity. He also received in the emperor's name the reports of the marshals and commanding generals and when necessary signed them on Napoleon's behalf. Detailed reports on everything that occurred for good or ill were to be sent to Berthier, who would in turn select the most important ones and transmit them to the emperor; nothing was to be concealed from Napoleon.

Lest one think this was as safe a job as modern staff officers, a contemporary subordinate staff officer, Brossier, reports that at the Battle of Marengo:

"The General-in-Chief Berthier gave his orders with the precision of a consummate warrior, and at Marengo maintained the reputation that he so rightly acquired in Italy and in Egypt under the orders of Bonaparte. He himself was hit by a bullet in the arm. Two of his aides-de-camp, Dutaillis and La Borde, had their horses killed."

== Organisation ==
Organisation of the Grande Armée during the War of the Third Coalition

One of the most important factors in the Grande Armée's success was its superior and highly flexible organisation. It was subdivided into several corps (usually from five to seven), each numbering anywhere between 10,000 and 50,000, with the average size being around 20,000 to 30,000 troops. These Corps d'Armée were self-contained, smaller armies of combined arms, consisting of elements from all the forces and support services discussed below. While capable of fully independent operations and of defending themselves until reinforced, the corps usually worked in close concert together and kept within a day's marching distance of one another. The corps would often follow separate routes on a wide front and were small enough to live by foraging, allowing fewer supplies to be carried. Through dispersion and the use of forced marches the Grande Armée was often able to surprise opposing armies by its speed of manoeuver. A corps, depending on its size and the importance of its mission, was commanded by a marshal, général en chef (general in chief (until 1812)) or général de division (lieutenant general). The likeness of military corps had already existed earlier in the 18th century, but it was not this perfect and permanent form created by Napoleon Bonaparte.

Napoleon placed great trust in his corps commanders and usually allowed them a wide freedom of action, provided they acted within the outlines of his strategic objectives and worked together to accomplish them. When they failed to do this to his satisfaction, however, he would not hesitate to reprimand or relieve them and in many cases took personal command of their corps himself. Corps were first formed in 1800, when General Jean Moreau divided the Army of the Rhine into four corps. These were only temporary groupings, however, and it was not until 1804 that Napoleon made them permanent units. He would sometimes form the cavalry into separate corps, so they would be able to move and mass more quickly without being slowed by the infantry or foot artillery.

The main tactical units of the corps were the divisions, usually consisting of 4,000 to 10,000 infantry or 2,000 to 4,000 cavalrymen. These in turn were made up of two or three brigades of two regiments apiece and supported by an artillery brigade of three or four batteries, each with six field cannons and two howitzers, making 24 to 32 guns in all. The divisions were also permanent administrative and operational units, commanded by a général de division and likewise capable of independent actions.

=== List of Corps ===
Corps	Commander(s)
I Corps	Jean-Baptiste Bernadotte; Louis-Nicolas Davout; Jean-Baptiste Drouet, Comte d'Erlon; Claude-Victor Perrin; Dominique Vandamme
II Corps	Jean-Baptiste Bessières; Jean Lannes; Auguste de Marmont; Nicolas Oudinot; Claude-Victor Perrin; Honoré Charles Reille; Jean Reynier; Jean-de-Dieu Soult
III Corps	Louis-Nicolas Davout; Michel Ney; Joseph Souham; Dominique Vandamme
IV Corps	Eugène de Beauharnais; Henri Gatien Bertrand; Étienne Maurice Gérard; François Joseph Lefebvre; André Masséna; Horace François Sébastiani; Jean-de-Dieu Soult
V Corps	Jean-Baptiste Drouet, Comte d'Erlon; Jean Lannes; Jacques Lauriston; François Joseph Lefebvre; André Masséna; Édouard Mortier; Józef Poniatowski; Anne Jean Marie René Savary
VI Corps	Auguste de Marmont; Georges Mouton; Michel Ney; Laurent de Gouvion Saint-Cyr
VII Corps	Pierre Augereau; François Joseph Lefebvre; Nicolas Oudinot; Jean Reynier; Laurent de Gouvion Saint-Cyr
VIII Corps	Jean-Andoche Junot; André Masséna; Édouard Mortier; Józef Poniatowski; Dominique Vandamme
IX Corps	Pierre Augereau; Jean-Baptiste Bernadotte; Jérôme Bonaparte; Jean-Baptiste Drouet, Comte d'Erlon; Claude-Victor Perrin
X Corps	François Joseph Lefebvre; Jacques MacDonald; Jean Rapp
XI Corps	Pierre Augereau; Jacques MacDonald; Auguste de Marmont
XII Corps	Nicolas Oudinot
XIII Corps	Louis-Nicolas Davout
XIV Corps	Laurent de Gouvion Saint-Cyr
I Cavalry Corps	Jean-Pierre Doumerc; Joachim Murat; Étienne de Nansouty; Pierre Claude Pajol; Victor de Fay
II Cavalry Corps	Jean-Baptiste Bessières; Rémy Joseph Isidore Exelmans; Louis-Pierre Montbrun; Antoine-Louis Decrest; Horace François Sébastiani
III Cavalry Corps	Jean-Toussaint Arrighi de Casanova; Emmanuel de Grouchy; François Étienne de Kellermann
IV Cavalry Corps	Victor de Fay; François Étienne de Kellermann; Édouard Jean Baptiste Milhaud
V Cavalry Corps	Samuel-François Lhéritier; Édouard Jean Baptiste Milhaud; Pierre Claude Pajol
VI Cavalry Corps	François Étienne de Kellermann

== Forces of the Grande Armée ==
=== Imperial Guard ===
The Imperial Guard (Garde impériale) was one of the most elite military forces of its time, and grew out of the Consular Guard (Garde consulaire). It formed a single Corps d'Armée with infantry, cavalry and artillery units like other corps, but with unique identities and uniforms. Napoleon also wanted it to be an example for the entire army to follow, and a force that, since it had fought with him over several campaigns, was completely loyal. Although the infantry was rarely committed en masse, the Guard's cavalry was often thrown into battle as the killing blow and its artillery used to pound enemies prior to assaults.

Size of the Imperial Guard over time
Year	Number of soldiers
1800	3,000
1804	8,000
1805	12,000
1810	56,000
1812	112,000
1813	85,000 (mostly the Young Guard)
1815	28,000

==== Infantry of the Guard ====
The Imperial Guard was divided into 2 sections:

- Old Guard (Vieille Garde): Composed of the longest serving veterans, the Old Guard was the elite of the elite guards regiments of the Grande Armée.
  - Imperial Guard Foot Grenadiers (Grenadiers à Pied de la Garde Impériale): The Grenadiers of the Guard was the most senior regiment in the Grande Armée. During the 1807 campaign in Poland, Napoleon gave the Grenadiers the nickname Les Grognards (The Grumblers). They were the most experienced and bravest infantrymen in the Guard, some veterans having served in over 20 campaigns. To join the Grenadiers, a recruit had to have served for at least 10 years, have received a citation for bravery, be literate, and be over 178 cm tall. The Old Guard were usually held in reserve for crucial moments on the battlefield, and unleashed to act as a hammer blow to a shaken enemy. For example, the 1er Régiment de Grenadiers à Pied saw heavy action at the Battle of Eylau. By 1815, the Old Guard grenadiers numbered four regiments, the 3rd and 4th Grenadiers having been added in 1810 and 1815 respectively. The 2nd, 3rd, and 4th Grenadiers were fully engaged at the Battle of Ligny, but two days later were defeated by the British as they advanced to in an attempt to smash the weakened British line at Waterloo. The two battalions of the 1st Grenadiers formed squares and fended off allied attacks to protect the general retreat. The Grenadiers à Pied wore a dark blue habit long (coat with long tails) with red turnbacks, epaulettes, and white lapels. The most distinguishing feature of the Grenadiers was the tall bearskin hat, decorated with an engraved gold plate, a red plume, and white cords.
  - Imperial Guard Foot Chasseurs (Chasseurs à Pied de la Garde Impériale): The Chasseurs of the Guard were the second most senior regiment in the Grande Armée. The 1st Chasseurs were the sister formation to the 1er Grenadiers à Pied. They had the same entry criteria, however accepted men who were 172 cm and taller. The Chasseurs were in action in several crucial battles. Following Napoleon's return in 1815, the Chasseurs was expanded to four regiments also, with the 2nd, 3rd, and 4th regiments being formed from recruits with only four years experience. These regiments also formed the assault of the Guard during the final phase of the Battle of Waterloo. The 2nd battalion of the 1st Chasseurs joined in the main attack of the Young Guard, but were repulsed, while the second guarded the emperor's headquarters. The Chasseurs à Pied wore a dark blue habit long with red turnbacks, red epaulettes fringed green, and white lapels. On campaign, the Chasseurs often wore dark blue trousers. As with the Grenadiers, the Chasseurs most distinguishing feature was the tall bearskin, decorated with a red over green plume and white cords.
- Young Guard (Jeune Garde): Initially, the Young Guard was made up of veterans with at least one campaign under their belts, together with bright young officers and the best of the annual intake of conscripts. Later its ranks would be filled almost entirely by select conscripts and volunteers.
  - Fusiliers-Chasseurs: In 1806, the Fusiliers-Chasseurs was formed as a regiment of the Young Guard. All members of the Fusilier-Chasseurs were veterans of 2–3 campaigns and were commissioned as NCOs in the line regiments. One of the best infantry of the entire Guard, the Fusiliers-Chasseurs most often operated together with its sister formation, the Fusiliers-Grenadiers, as part of a Guard Fusilier-Brigade. The Fusilier-Chasseurs saw extensive action, proving their worth time and time again, until they were disbanded in 1814, following Napoleon's abdication. The Fusiliers-Chasseurs were not reformed in 1815 for the Waterloo campaign. The Fusiliers-Chasseurs wore a dark blue habit (or coat) with green epaulettes fringed red, red turnbacks and white lapels. Under this they wore a white waistcoat and either blue or brown trousers. The Fusiliers-Chasseurs shako had white cords and a tall red over green plume. The Fusiliers-Chasseurs were armed with a Charleville model 1777 musket, bayonet and a short sabre.
  - Fusiliers-Grenadiers: Formed in 1807, the Fusiliers-Grenadiers was a regiment of Young Guard infantry. The Fusiliers-Grenadiers was organised in the same way as the Fusiliers-Chasseurs, being a slightly larger formation. The Fusiliers-Grenadiers most often operated together with its sister formation, the Fusiliers-Chasseurs, as a part of a Guard Fusilier-Brigade. The Fusilier-Grenadiers saw extensive action, proving their worth time and time again, until they were disbanded in 1814 following Napoleon's abdication. The Fusiliers-Grenadiers were not reformed in 1815. The Fusiliers-Grenadiers wore a dark blue habit with red epaulettes, red turnbacks, and white lapels. Under this they wore a white waistcoat and white trousers. The Fusiliers-Grenadiers wore a shako with white cords and a tall red plume. The Fusiliers-Grenadiers were armed with a Charleville model 1777 musket, bayonet, and a short sabre.
  - Tirailleurs-Grenadiers: In 1808, Napoleon ordered the most intelligent and strongest recruits to be formed into the first regiments of the Young Guard. The tallest of the recruits were inducted into the Tirailleurs-Grenadier regiments (renamed Tirailleurs in 1810). All officers of the Tirailleurs-Grenadiers were drawn from the Old Guard, and as such were entitled to wear bearskins. The NCOs were drawn from the Senior Young Guard Regiments. Having this leavening of hardened veterans helped to increase the morale and combat abilities of the Tirailleurs-Grenadiers, and its sister formations the Tirailleurs-Chasseurs. Tirailleurs-Grenadiers wore a dark blue habit with red epaulettes, dark blue turnbacks, and lapels piped white. The Tirailleurs-Grenadiers' shako had red cords with a long red plume.
  - Tirailleurs-Chasseurs: The shorter recruits of the Young Guard were inducted into the Tirailleurs-Chasseurs (renamed to Voltigeurs in 1810). The formation was identical to that of the Tirailleurs-Grenadiers, with all officers being drawn from the Old Guard, and NCOs coming from the Senior Young Guard Regiments. Tirailleurs-Grenadiers wore a dark blue habit with red turnbacks and dark blue lapels piped white. This was further decorated by green epaulettes with red fringing. Their shako was decorated with a large plume which could be coloured either green or red over green.
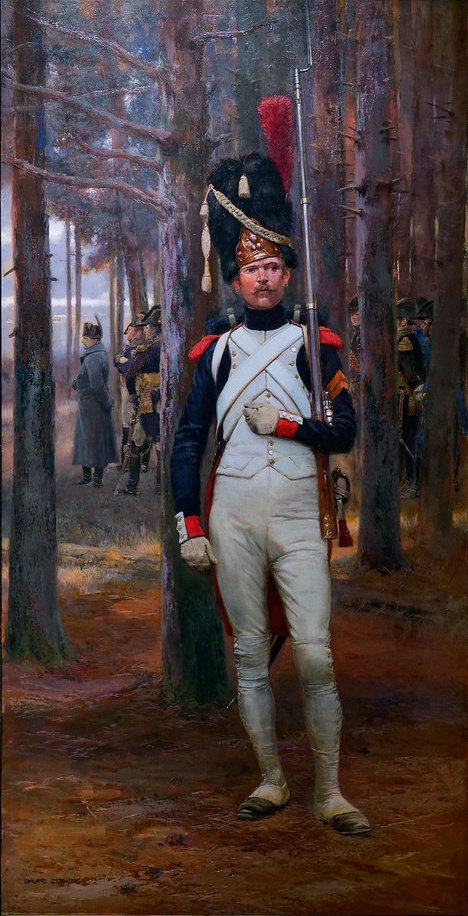
A Grenadier à Pied, 1812 (Napoleon can be seen in the background)

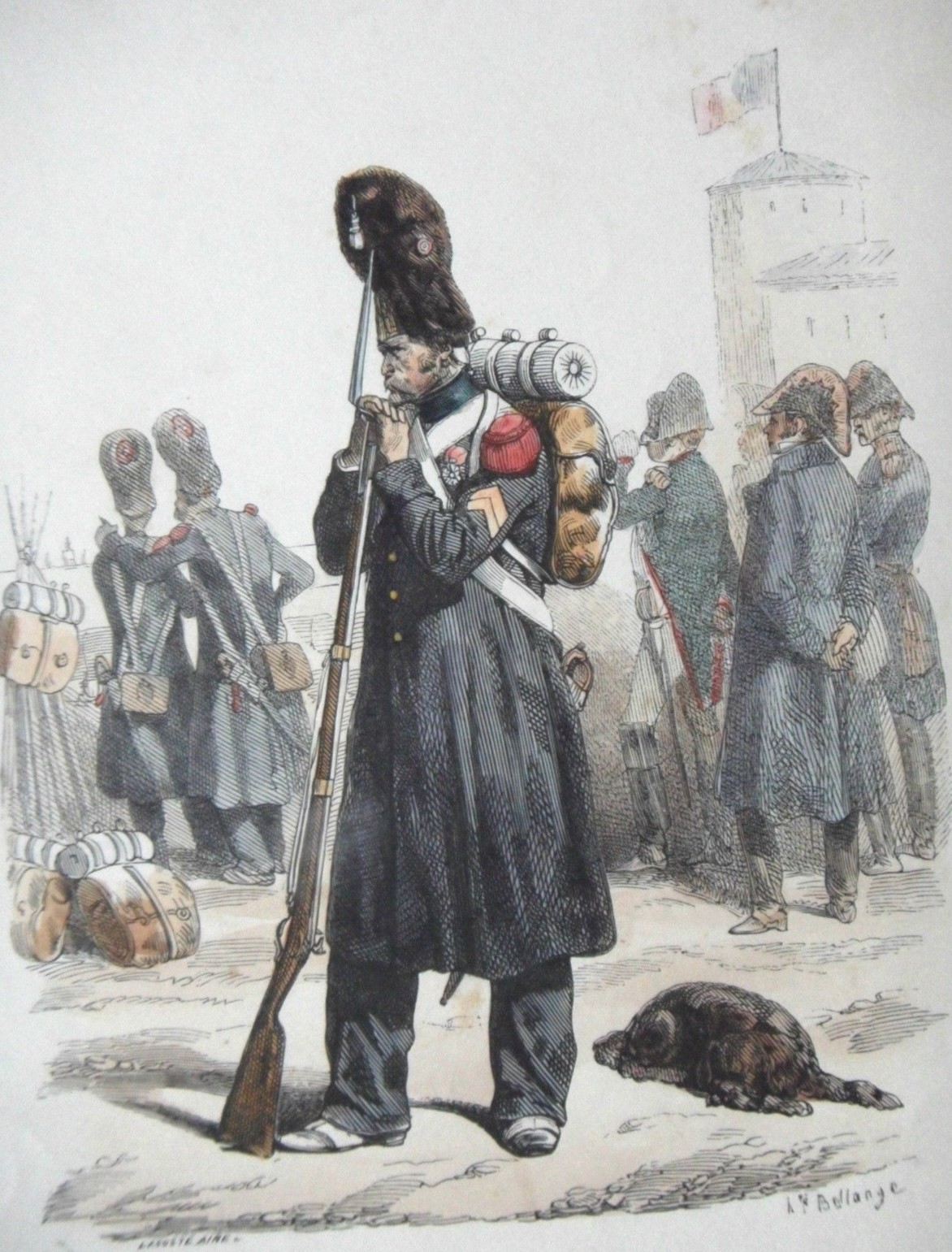
A Grognard of the Old Guard, 1813

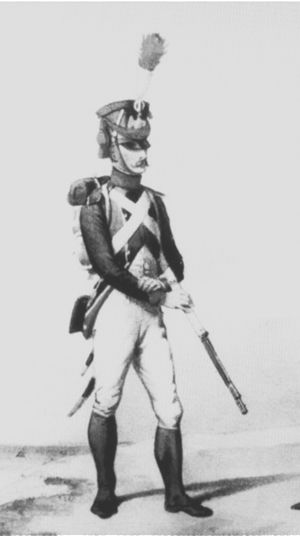
A Tirailleur of the 1er Régiment de Tirailleurs, Young Guard, 1811

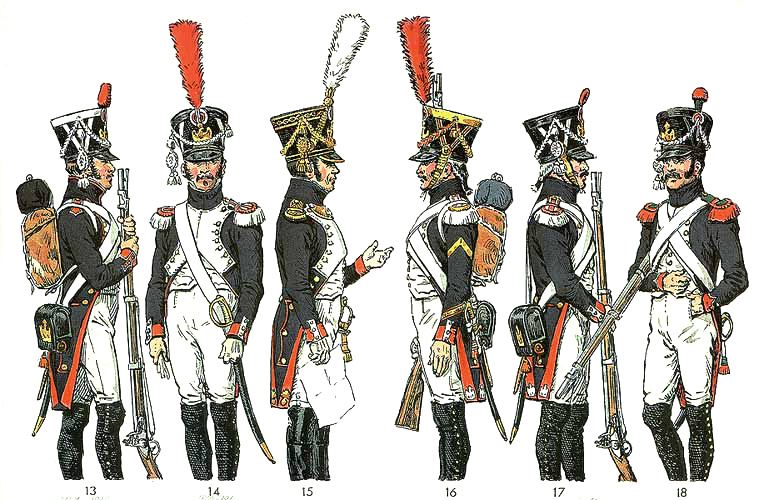
Fusilier-Grenadiers and Fusilier-Chasseurs. 1806–1814

==== Sailors of the Guard ====
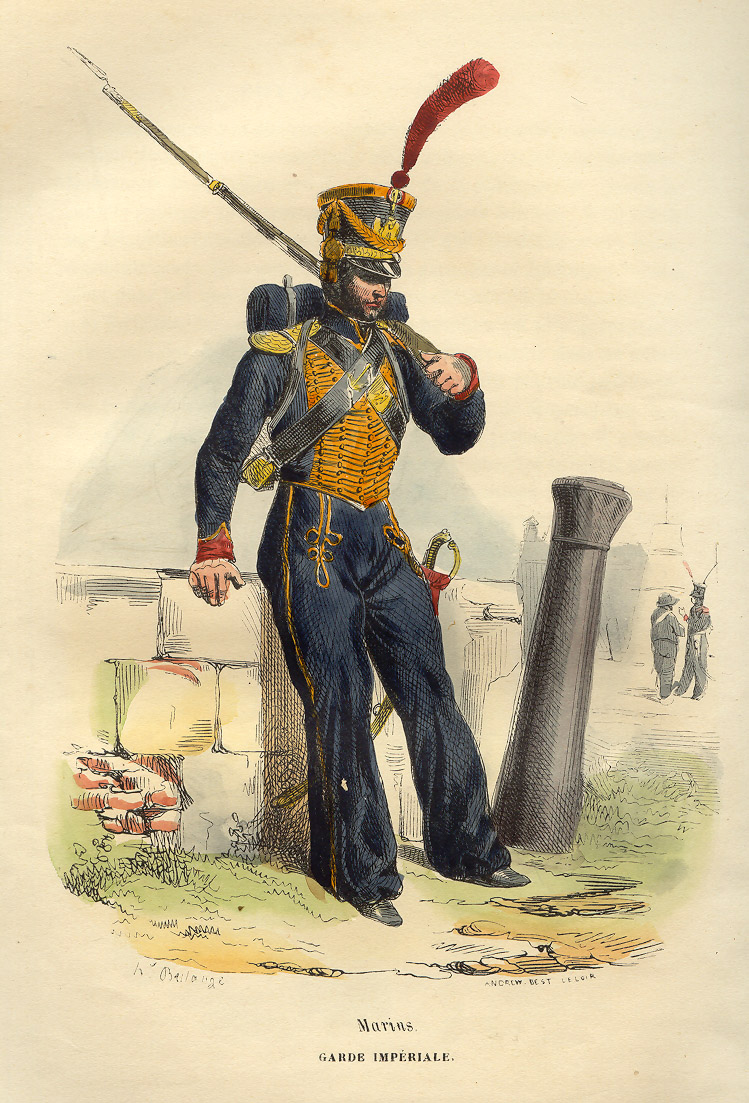
A Marine of the Guard

The four regiments of marines of the Ancien Régime disappeared on 28 January 1794. The Marins (French spelling) of the Grande Armée were divided into the Bataillon des Marins de la Garde Impériale, also known eventually as the Matelots de la Garde, formed on 17 September 1803, and Matelots des Bataillons de la Marine Impériale of which some 32,000 served with the French Navy at its height of expansion by Napoleon. Units of the latter were created for service on land by conscripting naval personnel surplus to requirement of the navy. There was also the marine artillery, which were mostly naval gunners used for coastal batteries and fortresses called bataillons de la Matelot du Haut-Bord (or Les Equipages de Haut-Bord – marines of the High Shore) created by decree of Napoleon on 1 April 1808. The flag of the 1er Régiment d'Artillerie de Marine survives today, and lists Lützen 1813 as one of its battle honours. Some 63 artillery batteries were manned (some numbers remaining vacant). Some examples include:

- 22ème Équipage de Haut-Bord from the ship Donauwörth
- Marine Regiment de Rochefort included the 16ème bataillon de marins
- Marine equipage de vasseux Admiral de Ruyter
- Marine equipage de vasseux L'Hannibal (serving with the Regiment de Rochefort 16ème bataillon)
- 4ème Équipage de Haut-Bord de vasseux Friedland
- 5ème and 48ème Équipage de Haut-Bord de vasseux La Licorne

The Marins de la Garde (transliterated as Marines of the Guard, but more accurately Sailors of the Guard) were organised into five equipages (ship's company), each with five escouades, with a total strength of 737 men, the unit having been created ostensibly for preparation of the invasion of Britain.

The unit was almost entirely destroyed in the Spanish campaign of 1808 at Bailén, but was rebuilt, and in 1810 the battalion was expanded to eight equipages with a total of 1,136 men, but this was severely reduced during the Russian campaign, and only 350 officers and men remained in its ranks by 1813. With Napoleon's first abdication, an ensign and 21 marines accompanied him to Elba, and returned with him for the Hundred Days campaign when their strength was increased to an equipage of 150 officers and men.

The marines were distinct in several ways from other Grande Armée units in that naval rather than army ranks were used, the uniform was based on that of those of the hussars, and it was the only unit of the Grande Armée in which the musicians used both the drums and the trumpets.

The battalions of marine artillery were conscripted for the 1813 German Campaign, and included four regiments with the 1st regiment intended to have 8 battalions, 2nd regiment with 10 battalions, and the 3rd and 4th regiments with four battalions each, totalling 9,640 men in all serving with Marshal Auguste de Marmont's VI Corps. Combined with sailor battalions, these fought as part of the Division de Marine at the battles of Lützen, Bautzen, Dresden, and won high praise at the Battle of Leipzig. The Marine Guard units were disbanded in 1815.

==== Cavalry of the Guard ====
In 1804, the Cavalry of the Guard consisted of two regiments, the Chasseurs à Cheval and the Grenadiers à Cheval, along with a small unit of elite Gendarmes and a squadron of Mamelukes. A third regiment was added in 1806, the Regiment de Dragons de la Garde Impériale (Later known as the Dragons de l'Imperatice, the Empress Dragoons). Following the campaign in Poland in 1807, a regiment of Polish lancers, the Regiment de Chevau-Légers de la Garde Impériale Polonais was added. The final addition was made in 1810, with another regiment of lancers, this time drawn from French and Dutch recruits, the 2e Regiment de Chevau-Légers Lanciers de la Garde Impériale or Red Lancers. The Cavalry of the Guard was involved in combat numerous times, and with few exceptions proved its worth in action.

- Imperial Guard Horse Grenadiers (Grenadiers à Cheval de la Garde Impériale): Known as the Gods or the Giants, these troopers were the elite of Napoleon's Guard Cavalry and the mounted counterparts of the Grognards. The Horse Grenadiers wore tall bearskin caps, dark blue coats and collars, white lapels, and tall boots. The entire formation was mounted on large black horses. A prospective recruit had to be over 176 cm tall, have accrued 10 years of service serving in a minimum of four campaigns, and have received a citation for bravery. The Grenadiers were effective at Austerlitz, where they defeated the Russian Guard cavalry, but their most powerful combat was at the Battle of Eylau. After standing under the fire of sixty Russian guns for a time, the troopers began to search for cover. Their commander, Colonel Louis Lepic, ordered the troops, "Up with your heads gentlemen, those are only bullets, not turds". Soon after they joined Marshal Murat's charge into the Russian lines. The Horse Grenadiers, together with the Polish lancers, were the only Guard Cavalry units never beaten in battle.

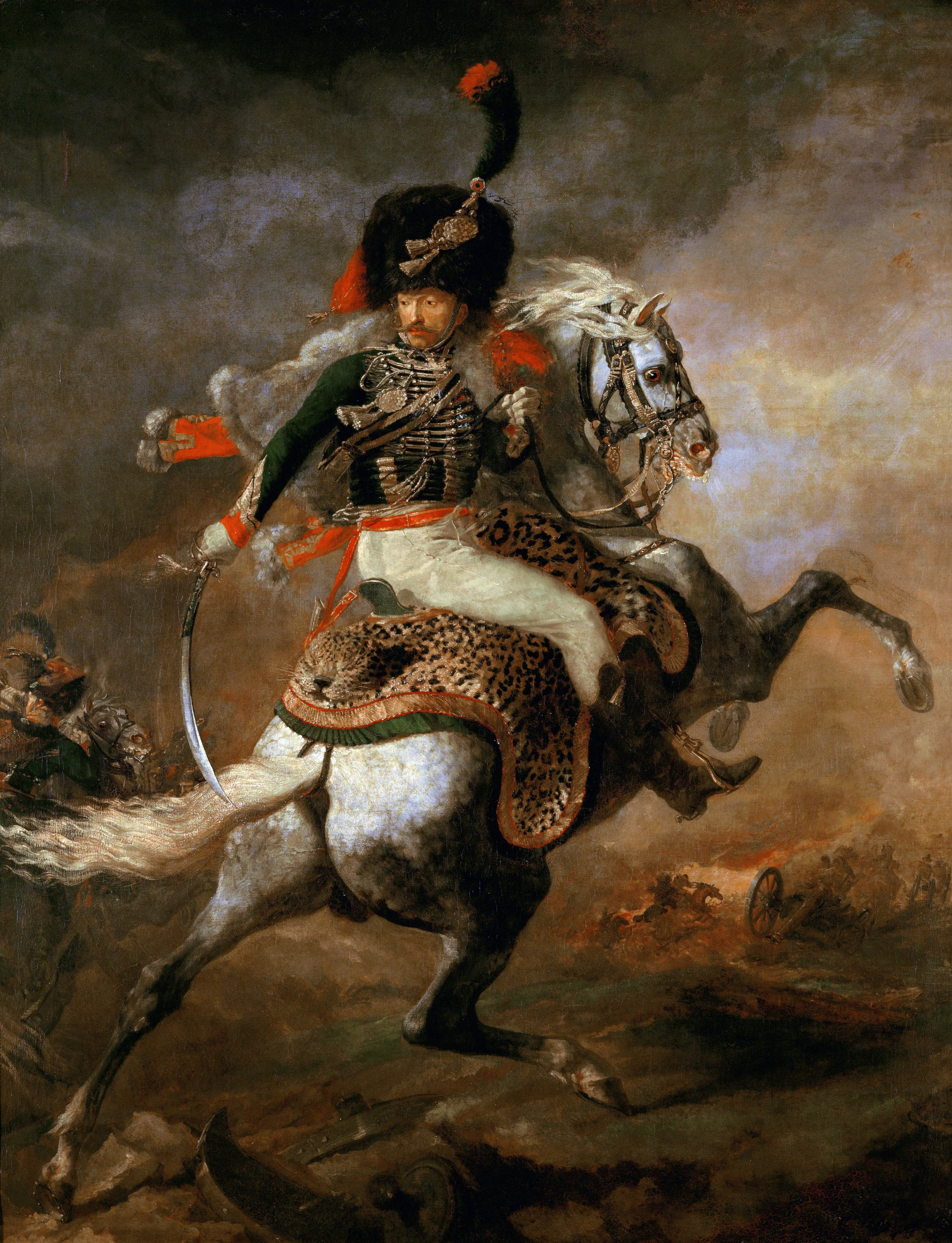
Le Chasseur de la Garde (Chasseur of the Guard, often mistranslated as The Charging Chasseur), 1812, by Théodore Géricault

- Imperial Guard Horse Chasseurs (Chasseurs à cheval de la Garde Impériale): Known as the Favoured Children (connotations of Spoiled Brats), the Chasseurs à Cheval of the Guard were the light cavalry of the Guard, Napoleon's favourites, and one of the most recognisable units in the Grande Armée.

In 1796, during the Italian campaign, Napoleon ordered the formation of a bodyguard unit after he narrowly escaped an attack by Austrian light cavalry at Borghetto while at lunch. This 200-man unit of Guides was the forerunner of the Chasseurs à Cheval of the Guard. They usually provided the personal escort of the Emperor. Their close affiliation with the emperor was shown by the fact that he habitually wore the old-style uniform of a colonel of their regiment. The Chasseurs themselves wore flamboyant green, red, and gold hussar style uniforms. They first saw combat during the Battle of Austerlitz, where they played a role in defeating the Russian Guard cavalry. During the Peninsular War, the Chasseurs were ambushed by a large British cavalry force at Benavente in 1808 and were defeated. They regained their reputation by showing extreme bravery during the Battle of Waterloo.

- Elite Gendarmes (Gendarmerie d'Elite): Nicknamed the Immortals because they rarely saw combat, the Gendarmes nonetheless performed a vital role. Gendarmes were the military police of the Grande Armée. Along with maintaining security and order near the headquarters, the Gendarmes would provide honour guards for high-ranking visitors, interrogate prisoners, and protect the emperor's personal baggage. The Gendarmes wore dark blue coats with red lapels and tall boots, along with a bearskin cap slightly smaller than that of the Horse Grenadiers. After 1807, the Gendarmes began to see more combat, distinguishing themselves in guarding the Danube bridges at Aspern-Essling in 1809.
- Squadron of Mamelukes (Escadron de Mamelouks): Fearsome desert warriors, whose loyalty Napoleon purchased during his Egyptian campaign. They combined superb horsemanship and swordsmanship with fanatical courage. Often romantically viewed as "authentic sons of the desert" or even "head-hunters", their officers were French, the NCOs and ranks comprising not only Egyptians and Turks, but also Greeks, Georgians, Syrians, and Cypriots as well, and even many of them were French. Originally they were an attached company (or "Half-Squadron") of the Chasseurs a Cheval de la Garde. They distinguished themselves at Austerlitz in 1805, winning their own standard, a second trumpeter and promotion to full squadron. This unit eventually became part of the Old Guard, and served the emperor right up to Waterloo. In 1813, a second Mameluke company was raised and attached to the Young Guard. As with their predecessors, they were incorporated into the Chasseurs, and served alongside them during the Hundred Days in 1815. By this time, the personnel being almost exclusively Frenchmen. Their distinct and colourful uniforms consisted of a green (later red) cahouk (hat), white turban, a loose shirt and a vest and red saroual (baggy trousers), with yellow, red, or tan boots. Their weapons consisted of a long, curved Scimitar, a brace of pistols, and a dagger. Their hats and weapons were inscribed with a crescent and star insignia of brass.
- Lancers of the Guard (Chevau-Légers-Lanciers de la Garde Impériale):
  - 1st Light Horse Regiment (Polish): In 1807 Napoleon authorized the raising of a guard regiment of Polish light cavalry. They were to be given French instructors and training. But during their first review before the emperor, their ranks became so entangled that Napoleon quipped, "These people only know how to fight!" and dismissed their instructors on the spot. But he kept his Polish cavalrymen by his side and the following year at Somosierra they would have another opportunity to prove themselves, on the battlefield instead of the parade ground. Napoleon ordered them to charge against a heavily fortified Spanish artillery position. Armed with only sabres and pistols, they overran four batteries, capturing over 20 cannons and decisively turned the tide. Following this, almost legendary, feat Napoleon proclaimed "Poles, You are worthy of my Old Guard I proclaim you my bravest cavalry!". Promoted to the Old Guard, they were then given lances, remained at the Emperor's side until Waterloo, and were never defeated by enemy cavalry. The 1st Regiment of the Guard developed a rivalry with their fellow Poles of the 1st Vistula Uhlans. This was not simply based on who was the better unit, but on deep political differences as well, with the lancers being fanatical Bonapartists, while many, if not most, of the uhlans held fiercely Republican sentiments. Such differences, political and otherwise, between units were not unusual and are well illustrated here. From being instructed by the French, they, along with their Vistula rivals, would go on to serve as instructors and models for the French and most other lancer regiments of the Grande Armée, thus greatly multiplying their fearsome effectiveness.
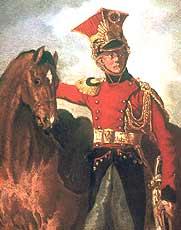
    A Red Lancer
  - 2nd Light Horse Regiment (French-Dutch): Formed in 1810 from a French and Dutch cadre. They were called Les Lanciers Rouges (the Red Lancers) due to their distinctive uniforms. They too suffered heavily in Russia at the hands of the Cossacks and the hardships of the winter, with most of its men and all but a handful of the horses lost. The regiment was rebuilt in 1813 and it became a powerful unit with its first four squadrons of veterans in the Old Guard and the new recruits of 6 junior squadrons in the Young Guard. They would distinguish themselves in numerous engagements, including Waterloo.
  - 3rd Light Horse Regiment (Polish): Formed in 1812 as part of the Young Guard, its officers and NCOs were veterans, but its ranks were filled by enthusiastic yet inexperienced students and sons of Polish and Lithuanian landholders. With little training, they were thrown into the Russian campaign where they were surrounded and the entire regiment wiped out at Slonim later that year by Cossacks and hussars.
- Empress Dragoons (Dragons de l'Impératice): Formed in 1806 as the Imperial Guard Dragoon Regiment (Regiment de Dragons de la Garde Impériale), it was renamed in honor of Empress Joséphine the following year. Originally, candidates had to have at least 6 (later 10) years of service, participated in no fewer than 2 campaigns with citations for bravery, be literate, and at least 173 cm tall (slightly shorter than for the Horse Grenadier Guards). No more than 12 candidates from each of the 30 regular dragoon regiments were allowed to apply at any one call, this quota would later be reduced to 10. Volunteers from other guard regiments were also allowed to transfer. Since this was as much a ceremonial as a combat unit and was rarely committed in battle, billets in the Empress Dragoons were highly sought after positions. As with the Red Lancers, it had squadrons in both the Old and Young Guards and served with the emperor until the end.
- Scouts of the Imperial Guard (Eclaireurs de la Garde Impériale): During the retreat from Moscow, Napoleon was highly impressed by the skills of many regiments of Cossacks. He used them as a model to create a new cavalry brigade, the Scouts, which were formed during the reorganisation of the Imperial Guard in December 1813. 3 regiments of a thousand men each were created and their squadrons attached to existing regiments:
  - 1st Regiment: scouts-grenadiers under Colonel-Major Claude Testot-Ferry's command (wounded and titled Baron of the Empire by Napoleon himself on the battlefield of Craonne on 7 March 1814)
  - 2nd Regiment: scouts-dragoons under Colonel Hoffmayer's command
  - 3rd Regiment: scouts-lanciers under Jean Kozietulski's command

The scouts had only the time to distinguish themselves during the defence of France in 1814 and were dissolved by King Louis XVIII upon the restoration of the Bourbon monarchy.

=== Infantry ===
While the infantry was perhaps not the most glamorous arm of service in the Grande Armée, they bore the brunt of most of the fighting, and their performance resulted in victory or defeat. The infantry was divided up into two major types, the Infantry of the Line (Infanterie de Ligne) and the Light Infantry (Infanterie Légère).

==== Line Infantry ====
The line infantry made up the majority of the Grande Armée. In 1803, Napoleon had reinstated the term "regiment", the revolutionary term "demi-brigade" (due to the fact there were two per brigade and it lacked the royal connotations) was now only used for provisional troops and depot units. At the time of the formation of the Grande Armée, the French Army had 133 Régiments de Ligne, a number which roughly corresponded with the number of départements in France. There would eventually be 156 Ligne regiments.

The Régiments de Ligne varied in size throughout the Napoleonic Wars, but the basic building block of the Infantry of the Line was the battalion. A line infantry battalion was numbered at about 840 men; however, this was the battalion's 'full strength' and few units ever reached this. A more typical strength for a battalion would be 400–600 men. From 1800 to 1803, a line infantry battalion had eight fusilier companies and one grenadier company. From 1804 to 1807, a line infantry battalion had seven fusilier companies, one grenadier company, and one voltigeur company. From 1808 to 1815, a line infantry battalion had four companies of fusiliers, one company of grenadiers, and one company of voltigeurs. According to the 1808 regulation, the staff of each company and the regiment HQ was the following:

Company (compagnie/peloton)
Rank/position		Number
English	French	Number
Captain	Capitaine	1
Lieutenant	Lieutenant	1
Second lieutenant	Sous-lieutenant	1
Sergeant major	Sergent-major	1
Sergeant	Sergent	4
Corporal-quartermaster	Caporal-fourrier	1
Corporal	Caporal	8
Private	Soldat	121
Drummer	Tambour	2
Total		140

Regiment HQ (État-Major)
Rank/position		Number
English	French	Number
Colonel	Colonel	1
Major	Major	1
Battalion commander	Chef de bataillon	4
Adjutant major	Adjudant-major	5
Quartermaster treasurer	Quartier-maître trésorier	1
Paymaster officer	Officier payeur	1
Eagle bearer	Porte-aigle	3
Surgeon major	Chirurgien-major	1
Surgeon's assistant	Aide chirurgien	4
Sub-assistant	Sous aide	5
Adjudant sub-officer	Adjudant sous-officier	10
Drum major	Tambour major	1
Drum corporal	Caporal tambour	1
Musician	Musicien	8
Master craftsman	Maîtres ouvrier	4
Total		50

In total, there were supposed to be 3,970 men in a regiment (840 in each four main battalions, and 560 in the rear battalion), among them 108 officers and 3,862 noncommissioned officers and privates.

===== Grenadiers =====
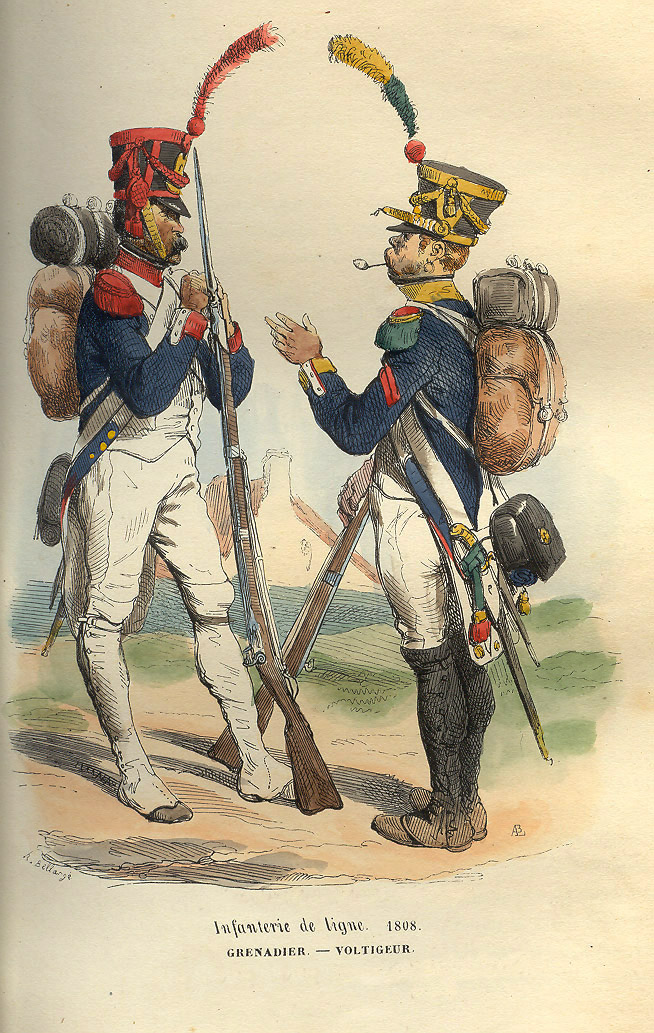
A French line infantry grenadier (left) and voltigeur (right) c. 1808, by Hippolyte Bellangé

Grenadiers were the elite of the line infantry and the veteran shock troops of the Grande Armée. Newly formed battalions did not have a grenadier company; rather, Napoleon ordered that after two campaigns, several of the strongest, bravest, and tallest fusiliers were to be promoted to a grenadier company, so each line battalion which had seen more than two campaigns had one company of grenadiers.

Regulations required that grenadier recruits were to be the tallest, most fearsome men in the regiments, and all were to have moustaches. To add to this, grenadiers were initially equipped with a bonnet à poil or bearskin, as well as red epaulettes on their coat. After 1807, regulations stipulated that line grenadiers were to replace their bearskin with a shako lined red with a red plume; however, many chose to retain their bearskins. In addition to the standard Charleville model 1777 and bayonet, grenadiers were also equipped with a short sabre. This was to be used for close combat, but most often ended up serving as a tool to cut wood for campfires.

A grenadier company would usually be situated on the right side of a formation, traditionally the place of greatest honour since the days of hoplite warfare in which a corps' right flank had less protection from the shield line of its formation. During a campaign, grenadier companies could be detached to form a grenadier battalion or occasionally a regiment or brigade. These formations would then be used as a shock force or the vanguard for a larger formation.

===== Voltigeurs of the Line =====
Voltigeurs (literally, Vaulters or Leapers) were elite light infantry of the line regiments. In 1805, Napoleon ordered that the smallest, most agile men of the line battalions be chosen to form a voltigeur company. These troops were to be second only to the grenadiers in the battalion hierarchy. Their name comes from their original mission; Voltigeurs were to vault upon horses of friendly cavalry for faster movement, an idea which proved impractical if not outright impossible. Despite this, the voltigeurs did perform a valuable task, skirmishing and providing scouts for each battalion, as well as providing an organic light infantry component for each line regiment. In training, emphasis was placed on marksmanship and quick movement.

Voltigeurs were equipped with large yellow and green or yellow and red plumes for their bicornes. After 1807, their shakos were lined with yellow and carried similar plumes. They also had yellow epaulettes lined green and a yellow collar on their coats.

Originally, voltigeurs were to be equipped with the short dragoon musket, however in practice, they were equipped with the Charleville model 1777 and bayonet. Like grenadiers, voltigeurs were equipped with a short sabre for close combat, and like grenadiers this was rarely used. Voltigeur companies could be detached and formed into regiments or brigades to create a light infantry formation. After 1808, the voltigeur company was situated on the left of the line when in combat. This was traditionally the second highest position of honour in the line of battle.

===== Fusiliers =====
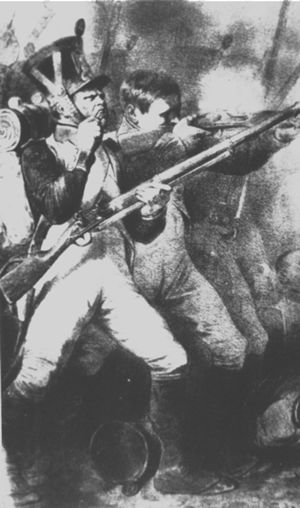
Fusiliers of the line, c. 1812

The fusiliers made up the majority of a line infantry battalion, and may be considered the typical infantryman of the Grande Armée. Fusiliers were armed with a smoothbore, muzzle-loaded flintlock Charleville model 1777 musket and a bayonet. Fusilier training placed emphasis on speed of march and endurance, along with individually aimed fire at close range and close quarters combat. This differed greatly from the training given to the majority of European armies, which emphasised moving in rigid formations and firing massed volleys. Many of the early Napoleonic victories were due to the ability of the French armies to cover long distances with speed, and this ability was thanks to the training given to the infantry. From 1803, each battalion comprised eight fusilier companies. Each company numbered around 120 men.

In 1805, one of the fusilier companies was dissolved and reformed as a voltigeur company. In 1808, Napoleon reorganised the infantry battalion from nine to six companies. The new companies were to be larger, comprising 140 men, and four of these were to be made up of fusiliers, one of grenadiers, and one of voltigeurs.

The fusiliers wore a bicorne, until this was superseded by the shako in 1807. The uniform of a fusilier consisted of white trousers, white surcoat and a dark blue coat (the habit long model until 1812, thereafter the habit veste) with white lapels, red collar and cuffs. Each fusilier wore a coloured pom-pom on his hat. The colour of this pom-pom changed depending on the company the man belonged to, as military uniforms reached their pinnacle at around this period in time. After the 1808 reorganisation, the first company was issued with a dark green pom-pom, the second with sky blue, the third with orange and the fourth with violet.

==== Light Infantry ====
While the infantry of the line made up the majority of the Grande Armée's infantry, the Infanterie Légère (Light Infantry) also played an important role. The Légère regiments never numbered more than 36 (compared with the 133 of the Ligne regiments), and the Ligne could perform all the same manoeuvres, including skirmishes. The difference laid in the training and the resulting high esprit de corps.

Training for Légère units placed strong emphasis on marksmanship and fast movement. As a result, the general Légère soldier was able to shoot more accurately and move faster than his Ligne counterpart. Légère regiments tended to see more action and were often used to screen large manoeuvres. Naturally, because commanders turned to the Légère for more missions than the Ligne, the Légère troopers enjoyed a higher esprit de corps and were known for their flamboyant uniforms and attitude. Also, Légère troops were required to be shorter than line troops, which helped them to move quickly through forests as well as to hide behind obstacles when skirmishing. The formation of a Légère battalion exactly mirrored that of a line infantry battalion, but different troop types were substituted for the grenadiers, fusiliers and voltigeurs.

===== Carabiniers-à-Pied =====
The carabiniers were the grenadiers of the Légère battalions. After two campaigns, the tallest and bravest chasseurs were chosen to join a carabinier company. They performed as elite shock troops for the battalion. As with the grenadiers, carabiniers were required to wear moustaches. They were armed with the Charleville model 1777, a bayonet, and a short sabre. The carabinier uniform consisted of a tall bearskin cap (superseded in 1807 by a red trimmed shako with a red plume). They wore the same uniform as the chasseurs, but with red epaulettes. Carabinier companies could be detached to form larger all carabinier formations for assaults or other operations requiring assault troops.

===== Light Voltigeurs =====
Voltigeurs performed exactly the same mission in the Légère battalion as they did in the line battalions, only they were more nimble and better marksmen. The Légère voltigeurs were dressed as chasseurs, but with yellow and green epaulettes and before 1806, a colpack (or busby) replaced the shako. The colpack had a large yellow over red plume and green cords. After 1807, a shako replaced the colpack, with a large yellow plume and yellow lining. As with the line voltigeurs, légère voltigeurs could be detached and used to form larger formations as needed.

===== Chasseurs =====
Chasseurs (Hunters) were the fusiliers of the Légère battalions. They made up the majority of the formation. They were armed with the Charleville model 1777 musket and a bayonet, and also with a short sabre for close combat.

From 1803, each battalion comprising eight chasseur companies. Each company numbered around 120 men. In 1808, Napoleon reorganised the infantry battalion from nine to six companies. The new companies were to be larger, comprising 140 men, and four of these were to be made up of chasseurs.

The chasseurs had far more ornate uniforms than their contemporaries the fusiliers. Until 1806, they were equipped with a cylindrical shako with a large dark green plume and decorated with white cords. Their uniform was a darker blue than that of the line regiments, to aid with camouflage while skirmishing. Their coat was similar to that of the line troops, but their lapels and cuffs were also dark blue, and it featured dark green and red epaulettes. They also wore dark blue trousers and high imitation hussar boots. After 1807, the cylindrical shako was replaced with the standard shako, but was still embellished by white cords. As with the line fusiliers, chasseur companies were distinguished by coloured pom-poms, but the colours for the different companies changed from regiment to regiment.

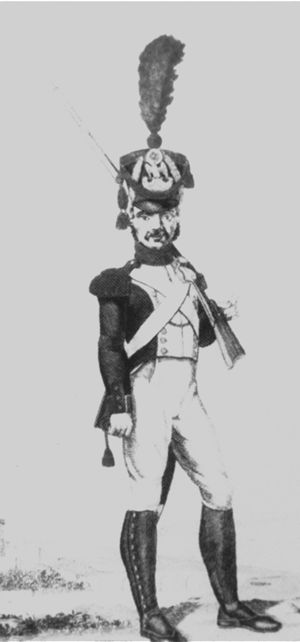
A grenadier of the line, c. 1812

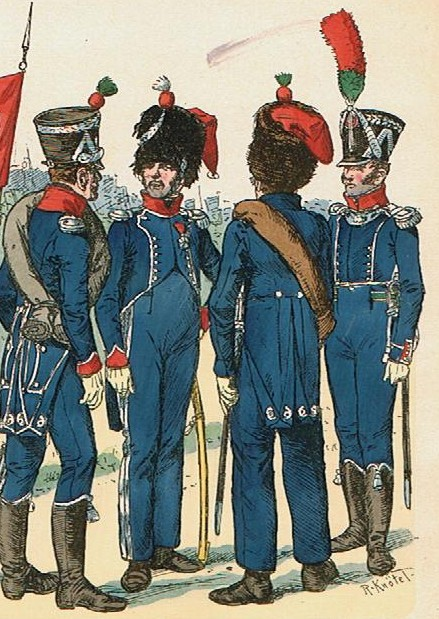
Officers of Infanterie Légère, 1803–1815

Chasseurs of Infanterie Légère, 1806

=== Cavalry ===
By decree of the emperor himself, cavalry typically were between a fifth and a sixth of the Grande Armée. Cavalry regiments of 800–1,200 men were made up of three or four escadrons of two companies each, plus supporting elements. In light cavalry and dragoon regiments, the first company of every regiment's first escadron, was always designated as 'elite', with presumably, the best men and horses. In the revolution's wake, the cavalry suffered the greatest from the loss of experienced aristocratic officers and NCOs still loyal to the Ancien Régime. Consequently, the quality of French cavalry drastically declined. Napoleon rebuilt the branch, turning it into arguably the finest in the world. Until 1812, it was undefeated in any large engagements above the regimental level. Indeed, in terms of combat skill, the French cavalrymen were inferior to the other great European powers of the time, performing worse in combats of this level (in general). The reason for this is a banal lack of preparation for horsemanship. Nevertheless, the strength of the French cavalry lay within the Napoleonic organization of the French army. It performed better at a higher level of command, concentrating in large masses. For example, in a major battle, the cavalry reserve would break through enemy lines at a decisive moment or counterattack an advancing enemy. There were two primary types of cavalry for different roles, heavy and light.

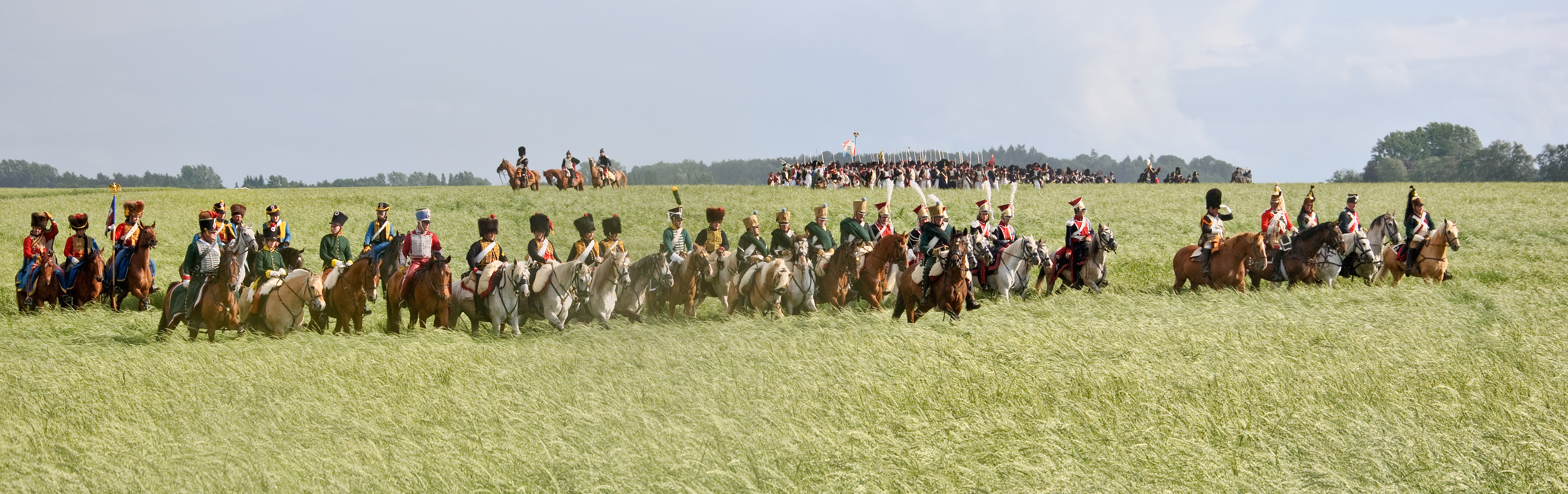
Sample of the cavalry of the Grande Armée during a reenactment of the Battle of Waterloo

==== Heavy cavalry ====
===== Carabiniers-à-Cheval (Horse Carabiners) =====
The elite among all French heavy cavalry line formations, the two regiments of mounted carabiniers had a very similar appearance with the mounted grenadiers of the Imperial Guard; bearskins, long blue coats, etc. and were mounted exclusively on black horses prior to 1813. They were largely used in identical manner to the Cuirassiers, but being (initially) unarmored, they were less suited for close-quarters, melee combat. Unarmored heavy cavalry was the norm in Europe during most of the Napoleonic Wars, with the French being the first to reintroduce the back-and-breastplate. In 1809, appalled by their mauling at the hands of Austrian uhlans, Napoleon ordered that they be given armour. The carabinier's refusal to copy the less elite cuirassiers resulted in them being given special armor, with their helmets and cuirasses being sheathed in bronze for added visual effect. But this did not prevent them from being defeated by Russian cuirassiers at Borodino in 1812, and panicking before Hungarian hussars at Leipzig the following year.

===== Cuirassiers =====
The heavy cavalry, wearing a heavy cuirass (breastplate) and helmets of brass and iron and armed with straight long sabers, pistols, and later carbines. Like medieval knights, they served as mounted shock troops. Because of the weight of their armour and weapons, both the trooper and the horse had to be big and strong, and could put a lot of force behind their charge. Though the cuirass could not protect against direct musket fire, it could deflect ricochets and shots from long range, and offered some protection from pistol shots. More importantly, the breastplates protected against the swords and lances of opposing cavalry. Napoleon often combined all of his cuirassiers and carabiniers into a cavalry reserve, to be used at the decisive moment of the battle. In this manner, they proved to be an extremely potent force on the battlefield. The British, in particular, who mistakenly believed the cuirassiers were Napoleon's bodyguard, and would later come to adapt their distinctive helmets and breastplates for their own Household Cavalry. There were originally 25 cuirassier regiments, reduced to 12 by Napoleon initially who later added three more. At the beginning of his rule, most of the cuirassier regiments were severely understrength, so Napoleon ordered the best men and horses to be allocated to the first 12 regiments, while the rest were reorganised into dragoons.

==== Medium cavalry ====
===== Dragoons =====
The medium-weight mainstays of the French cavalry, although considered heavy cavalry, who were used for battle, skirmishing, and scouting. They were highly versatile being armed not only with distinctive straight swords, but also muskets with bayonets enabling them to fight as infantry as well as mounted, though fighting on foot had become increasingly uncommon for dragoons of all armies in the decades preceding Napoleon. The versatility of a dual-purpose soldier came at the cost of their horsemanship and swordsmanship often not being up to the same standards as those of other cavalry. Finding enough large horses proved a challenge. Some infantry officers were even required to give up their mounts for the dragoons, creating resentment towards them from this branch as well. There were 25, later 30, dragoon regiments. In 1815, only 15 could be raised and mounted in time for the Waterloo campaign.

==== Light cavalry ====
===== Hussars =====
These fast, light cavalrymen were the eyes, ears, and egos of the Napoleonic armies. They regarded themselves as the best horsemen and swordsmen (beau sabreurs) in the entire Grande Armée. This opinion was not entirely unjustified and their flamboyant uniforms reflected their panache. Tactically, they were used for reconnaissance, skirmishing, and screening for the army to keep their commanders informed of enemy movements while denying the enemy the same information and to pursue fleeing enemy troops. Armed only with curved sabres and pistols, they had reputations for reckless bravery to the point of being almost suicidal. It was said by their commander General Antoine Lasalle that a hussar who lived to be 30 was truly an old guard and very fortunate. Lasalle was killed at the Battle of Wagram at age 34. There were 10 regiments in 1804, with an 11th added in 1810 and two more in 1813.

===== Chasseurs à Cheval (Mounted Hunters) =====
These were light cavalry identical to hussars in arms and role. But, unlike the chasseurs of the Imperial Guard and their infantry counterparts, they were considered less prestigious or elite. Their uniforms were less colourful as well, consisting of infantry-style shakos (in contrast to the fur busby worn by some French hussars), green coats, green breeches, and short boots. They were, however, the most numerous of the light cavalry, with 31 regiments in 1811, 6 of which comprised Flemish, Swiss, Italians and Germans, was a cavalry composed of chasseurs but on the horse, they could ride into melee or shoot as light infantry

===== Lancers =====
Some of the most feared cavalry in the Grande Armée were the Polish lancers of the Vistula Uhlans. Nicknamed Hell's Picadors or Los Diablos Polacos (The Polish Devils) by the Spanish, these medium and light horse (Chevau-Légers Lanciers) cavalry had near equal speed to the hussars, shock power almost as great as the cuirassiers, and were nearly as versatile as the dragoons. They were armed with, as their name indicates, lances along with sabres and pistols. Initially, French ministers of war insisted on arming all lancers identically. Real battlefield experience, however, proved that the Polish way of arming only the first line with lance while the second rank carried carbines instead was much more practical and thus was adopted. Lancers were the best cavalry for charging against infantry squares, where their lances could outreach the infantry's bayonets, (as was the case with Colborne's British brigade at Albuera in 1811) and also in hunting down a routed enemy. Their ability to scour and finish off the wounded without ever stepping off their saddle created perfect scenes of horror for the enemy. They could be deadly against other types of cavalry as well, as demonstrated by the fate of Sir William Ponsonby and his Scots Greys at Waterloo. Excluding those of the Guard, there were 9 lancer regiments.

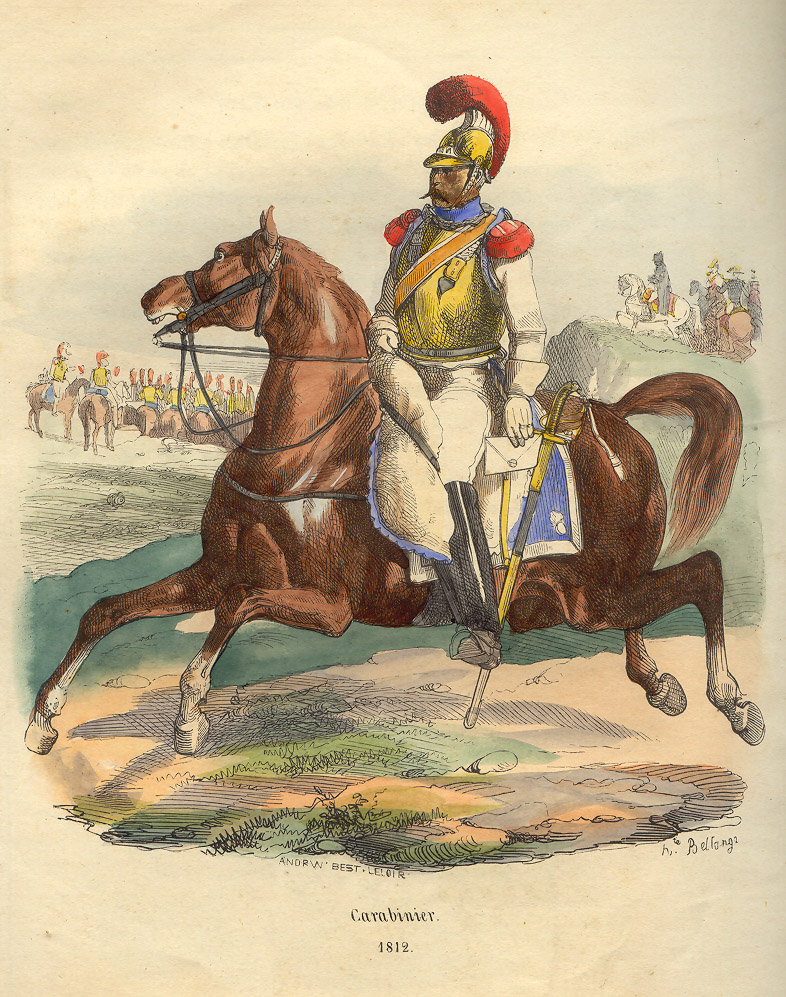
A Carabiniers-à-Cheval

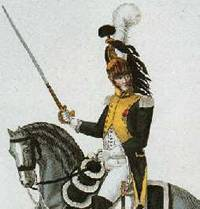
A dragoon officer of the 21ème Régiment de Dragons

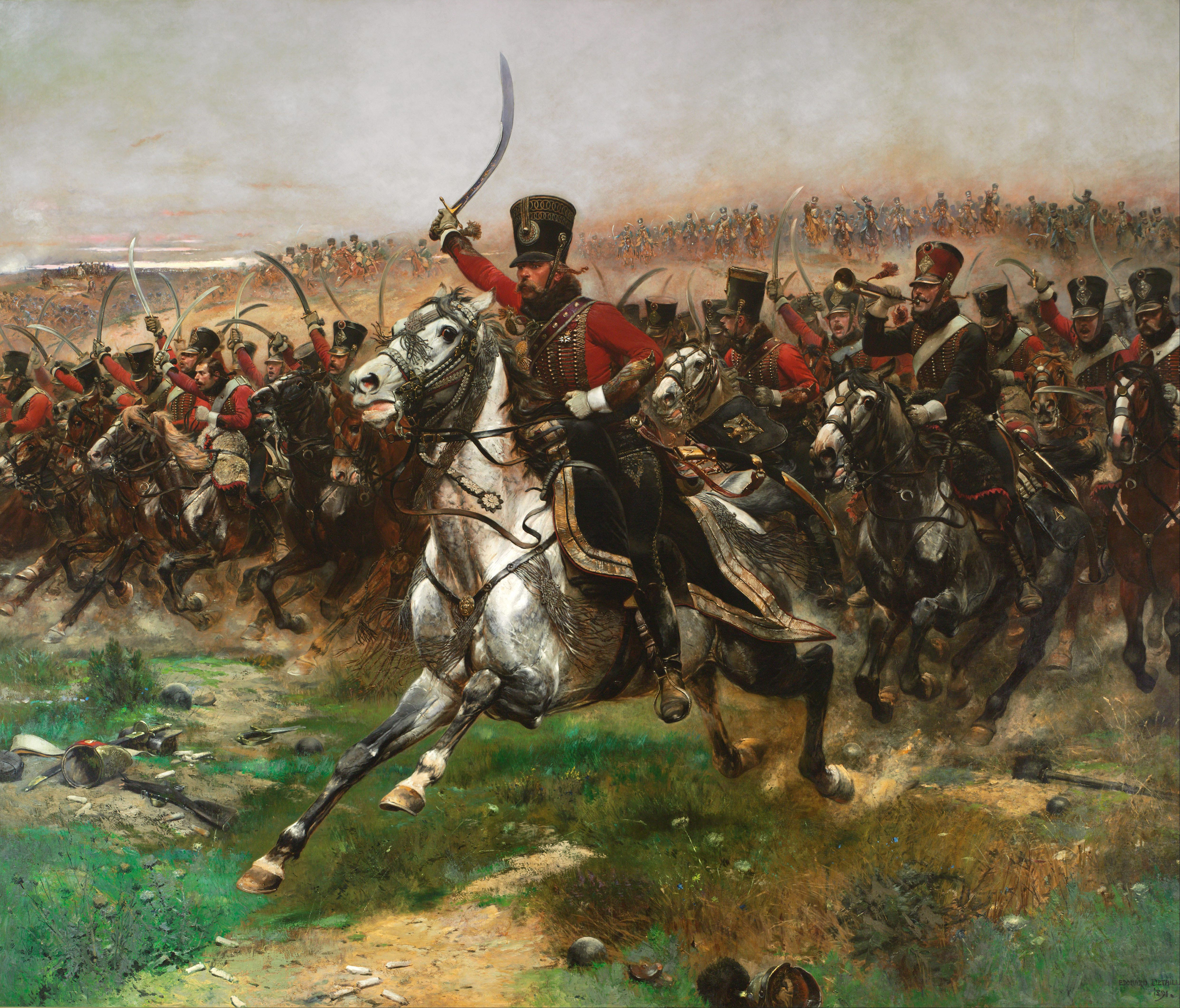
French 4th Hussars at the Battle of Friedland

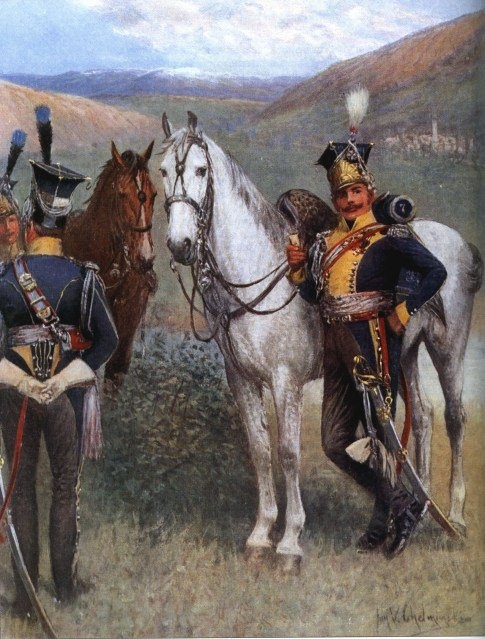
A lancer of the Régiment de la Vistule Uhlans

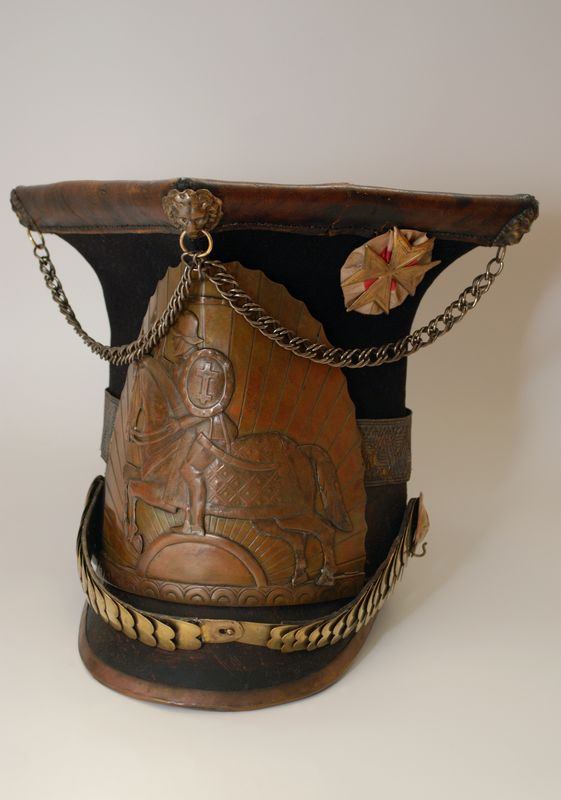
Hat of a soldier of the 17th Lithuanian Uhlan Regiment with Vytis

=== Artillery ===
The emperor was a former artillery officer, and reportedly said "God fights on the side with the best artillery." As such, French cannons were the backbone of the Grande Armée, possessing the greatest firepower of the three arms and hence the ability to inflict the most casualties in the least amount of time. The French guns were often used in massed batteries (or grandes batteries) to soften up enemy formations before being subjected to the closer attention of the infantry or cavalry. Superb gun-crew training allowed Napoleon to move the weapons at great speed to either bolster a weakening defensive position, or else hammer a potential break in enemy lines.

Besides superior training, Napoleon's artillery was also greatly aided by the numerous technical improvements to French cannons by General Jean Baptiste de Gribeauval which made them lighter, faster, and much easier to sight, as well as strengthened the carriages and introduced standard sized calibres. In general, French guns were 4-pounders, 8-pounders, or 12-pounders and 6-inch (150 mm) howitzers with the lighter calibres being phased out and replaced by 6-pounders later in the Napoleonic Wars. French cannons had brass barrels and their carriages, wheels, and limbers were painted olive-green. Superb organisation fully integrated the artillery into the infantry and cavalry units it supported, yet also allowed it to operate independently if the need arose. There were two basic types, Artillerie à pied (foot artillery) and Artillerie à cheval (horse artillery).

==== Foot artillery ====
As the name indicates, these gunners marched alongside their guns, which were, of course, pulled by horses when limbered (undeployed). Hence, they travelled at the infantry's pace or slower. In 1805, there were eight, later ten, regiments of foot artillery in the Grande Armée plus two more in the Imperial Guard, but unlike cavalry and infantry regiments, these were administrative organisations. The main operational and tactical units were the batteries (or companies) of 120 men each, which were formed into brigades and assigned to the divisions and corps.

- Divisional artillery: Every division had a brigade of three or four batteries of 8 guns (six cannons and two howitzers) each.
- Corps artillery reserve: Each corps would also have its own artillery reserve, of one or more brigades, armed mostly with the larger, heavier calibre pieces.

Battery personnel included not only gun crews, NCOs, and officers, but drummers, trumpeters, metal workers, woodworkers, ouvriers, furriers, and artificers. They would be responsible for fashioning spare parts, maintaining and repairing the guns, carriages, caissons and wagons, as well as tending the horses and storing munitions.

==== Horse artillery ====
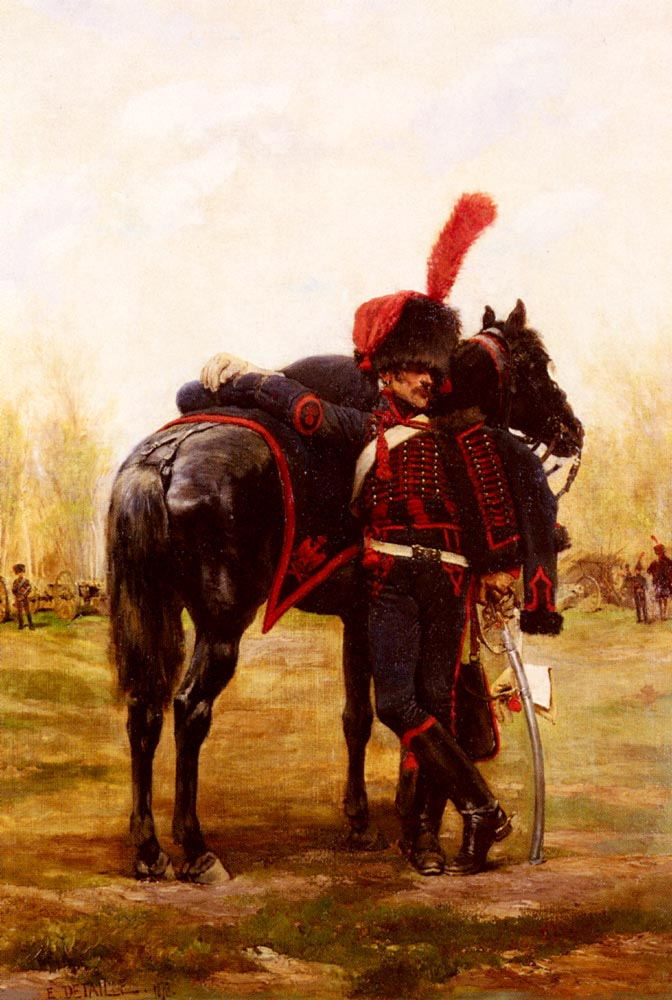
A gunner from the horse artillery of the Imperial Guard

The cavalry were supported by the fast moving, fast firing light guns of the horse artillery. This arm was a hybrid of cavalry and artillery with their crews riding either on the horses or on the carriages into battle. Because they operated much closer to the front lines, the officers and crews were better armed and trained for close quarters combat, mounted or dismounted much as were the dragoons. Once in position, they were trained to quickly dismount, unlimber (deploy), and sight their guns, then fire rapid barrages at the enemy. They could then quickly limber (undeploy) the guns, remount, and move on to a new position. To accomplish this, they had to be the best trained and most elite of all artillerymen. The horse batteries of the Imperial Guard could go from riding at full gallop to firing their first shot in just under a minute. After witnessing such a performance, an astounded Duke of Wellington remarked, "They move their cannon as if it were a pistol!" There were six administrative regiments of horse artillery plus one in the Guard. In addition to the batteries assigned to the cavalry units, Napoleon would also assign at least one battery to each infantry corps or, if available, to each division. Their abilities came at a price, however, as horse batteries were very expensive to raise and maintain. Consequently, they were far fewer in number than their foot counterparts, typically constituting only one fifth of the artillery's strength. It was a boastful joke among their ranks that the emperor knew every horse gunner by name. Besides better training, horses, weapons, and equipment, they used far more ammunition. Horse batteries were given twice the ammo ration of the foot, three times that of the Guard.

==== Ammunition ====
Of all the types of ammunition used in the Napoleonic Wars, the cast iron, spherical, round shot was the staple of the gunner. Even at long range when the shot was travelling relatively slowly it could be deadly, though it might appear to be bouncing or rolling along the ground relatively gently. At short range, carnage could result.

Round shots were undeniably inaccurate. This was because, despite their name, round shots were never perfectly spherical, nor did they fit their gun barrels exactly. Air acted on the irregular surface of the projectile. These irregularities invariably threw them off target to some degree. It is often also a matter of confusion as to why a 12-pdr shot was so much more effective than a 6-pdr shot. This is because the impact of a shot was not only related to its weight but also to its velocity, which, with a heavier projectile, was much greater at the end of the trajectory.

There were two forms of close-range weapons, which were extremely useful at up to 270m (300 yards). Grapeshot and canister, or case, were the anti-personnel weapons of choice of the gunner. Grape was a cluster of large metal spheres tied together around a central spindle and base and normally sewn into a bag, whereas canister was a metal case filled with smaller iron or lead spheres. The whole purpose of these types of shot was to break up when fired from the gun forming a wide cone of flying metal that acted in the same way as a shotgun cartridge.

For longer-range anti-personnel work, the common shell was also used. This was normally only fired from a mortar or howitzer and was a hollow sphere filled with gunpowder charge. The top of the shell had thinner walls than the bottom and had an orifice into which was forced a wooden fuse normally made of beech wood. The fuse was designed to be ignited by the discharge of the gun and had a central channel drilled through it and filled with a burning compound. Before firing, the fuse was cut to a certain length corresponding to the desired time of burning and hammered into the top of the shell by a mallet. When it arrived over the target, the fuse, if correctly prepared, exploded the main charge, breaking open the metal outer casing and forcing flying fragments in all directions. Although favoured for siege work, the common shell was not always effective against infantry.

The final type of projectile for the field artillery used by the French was the incendiary or carcass (a name for an incendiary projectile). Initially, this device was composed of a metal frame, which was covered with a canvas cover and filled with a special recipe, typically 50 saltpetre parts, 25 sulfur parts, 8 rosin parts, 5 antimony parts, and 5 pitch parts. However, during the early 19th century, another form of carcass became common and this took the form of a common shell with two or three apertures in its exterior into which a similar composition was put. Carcass rounds were normally issued only to howitzers or mortars, the suggestion being they were intended to attack towns. This does not preclude them from being used on the field, but quite what their purpose would have been there is not clear.

It is important to know that not all nations shared the same types of artillery projectiles. For example, the Congreve rocket, inspired from the Mysorean rocket artillery, or the shrapnel shell, which combined the killing effect of grapeshot with the ranges achieved by round shot, were used only by the British Army.

==== Artillery train ====
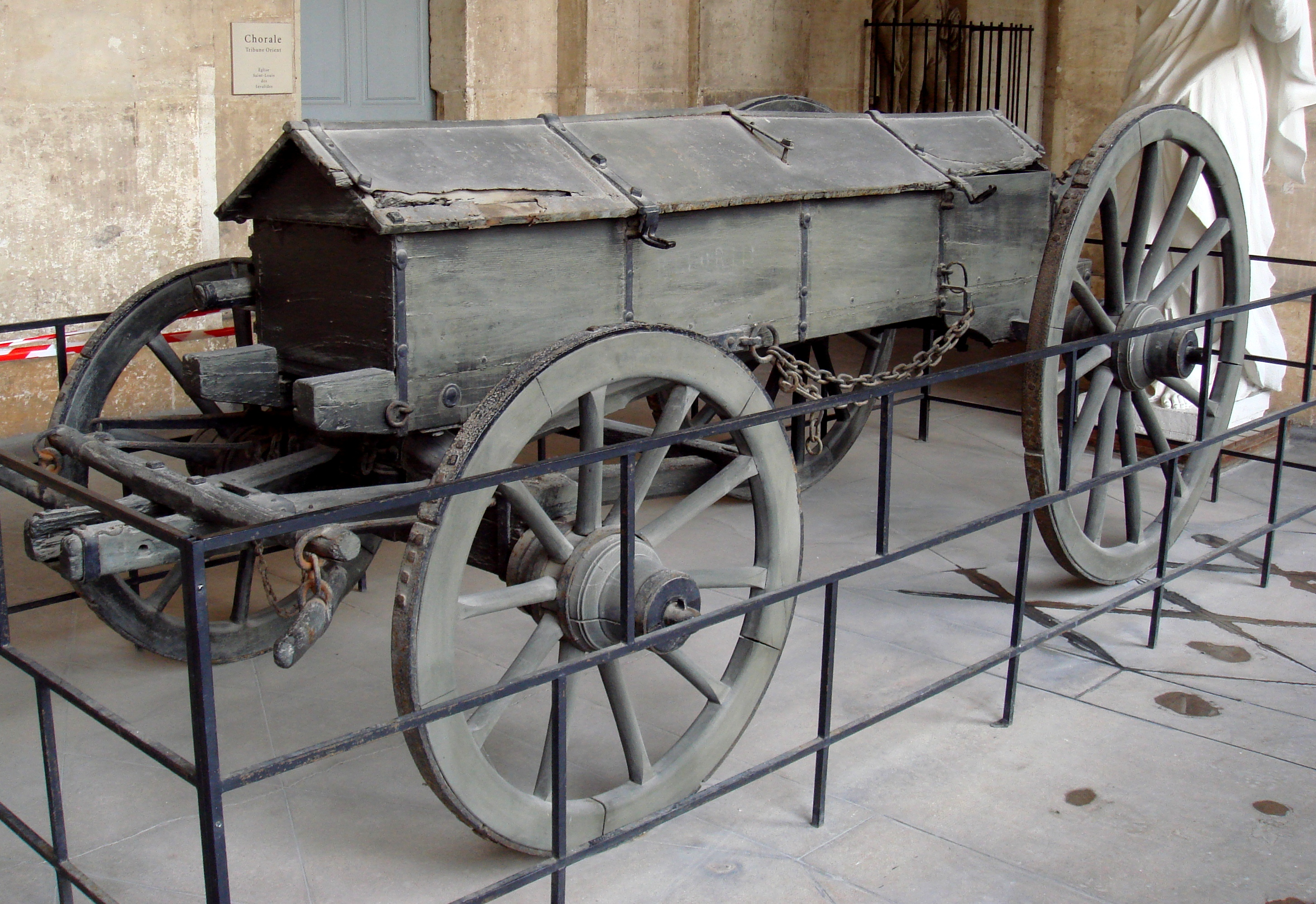
A Gribeauval artillery caisson on display at the Musée de l'Armée, Paris

The train d'artillerie, was established by Napoleon in January 1800. Its function was to provide the teamsters and drivers which handled the horses that hauled the artillery's vehicles. Prior to this, the French, like all other period armies, had employed contracted, civilian teamsters who would sometimes abandon the guns under fire, rendering them immobile, rather than risk their lives or their valuable teams of horses. Its personnel, unlike their civilian predecessors, were armed, trained, and uniformed as soldiers. Apart from making them look better on parade, this made them subject to military discipline and capable of fighting back if attacked. The drivers were armed with a carbine, a short sword of the same type used by the infantry, and a pistol. They needed little encouragement to use these weapons, earning surly reputations for gambling, brawling, and various forms of mischief. Their uniforms and coats of grey helped enhance their tough appearance. But their combativeness could prove useful as they often found themselves attacked by Cossacks and Spanish and Tyrolian guerillas.

Each train d'artillerie battalion was originally composed of 5 companies. The first company was considered elite and assigned to a horse artillery battery; the three "centre" companies were assigned to the foot artillery batteries and "parks" (spare caissons, field forges, supply wagons, etc.); and one became a depot company for training recruits and remounts. Following the campaigns of 1800, the train was re-organised into eight battalions of six companies each. As Napoleon enlarged his artillery, additional battalions were created, rising to a total of fourteen in 1810. In 1809, 1812, and 1813 the first thirteen battalions were "doubled" to create 13 additional battalions. Additionally, after 1809 some battalions raised extra companies to handle the regimental guns attached to the infantry.

The Imperial Guard had its own train, which expanded as La Garde's artillery park was increased, albeit organised as regiments rather than battalions. At their zenith, in 1813–14, the Old Guard artillery was supported by a 12-company regiment while the Young Guard had a 16-company regiment, one for each of their component artillery batteries.

=== Foreign troops in the Grande Armée ===
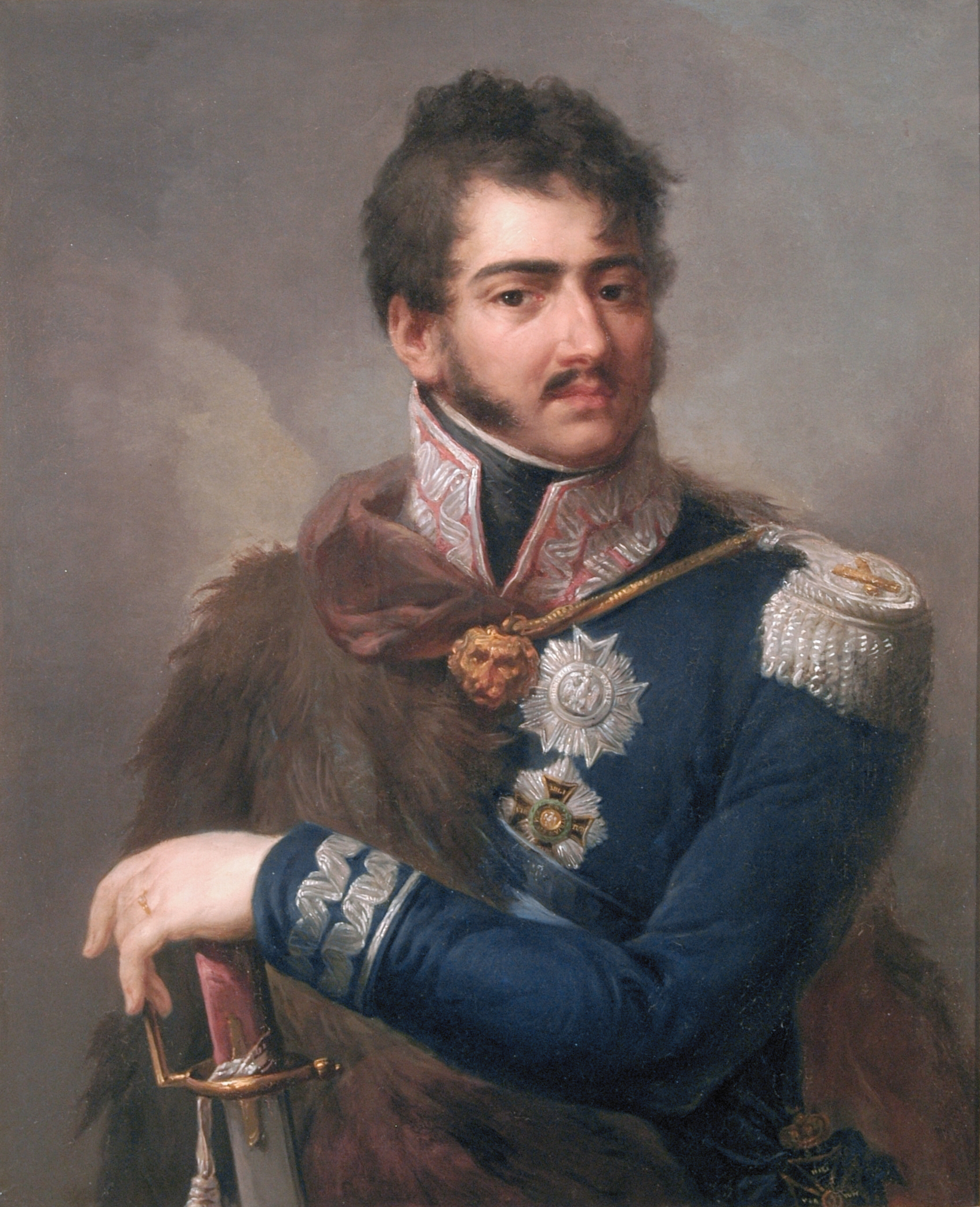
Józef Poniatowski, a Polish general and prince of the Duchy of Warsaw who served with the Grande Armée from 1807 to 1813, and was later made a Marshal of the Empire at the Battle of Leipzig

Many European armies recruited foreign troops, and France was no exception. Foreign troops played an important role and fought with distinction in the Grande Armée during the Napoleonic Wars. Almost every continental European country was, at different stages, a part of the Grande Armée. By the end of the conflict, tens-of-thousands had served. In 1805, 35,000 troops from France's allies were used to protect lines of communications and flanks of the main army. In 1806, 27,000 more troops were called up for similar purposes, plus 20,000 Saxon troops who were used for mopping up operations against the Prussians. In the winter of 1806–07, Germans, Poles, and Spaniards helped seize the Baltic ports of Stralsund and Danzig on the army's left flank. At the Battle of Friedland in 1807, Marshal Jean Lannes' corps was formed considerably from Poles, Saxons, and Dutch. For the first time, foreign troops had played a role in a major battle, and done so with distinction. During the War of the Fifth Coalition, as many as one-third of the Grande Armée, were from the Confederation of the Rhine, and one-quarter of the Army in Italy was Italian. At the Grande Armée's peak in 1812, more than one-third of the troops that marched into Russia were non-French and represented 20 countries, including Austria and Prussia. General Julius von Grawert initially led the Prussian detachment, but was replaced by General Ludwig Yorck.

== Support services ==
=== Engineers ===
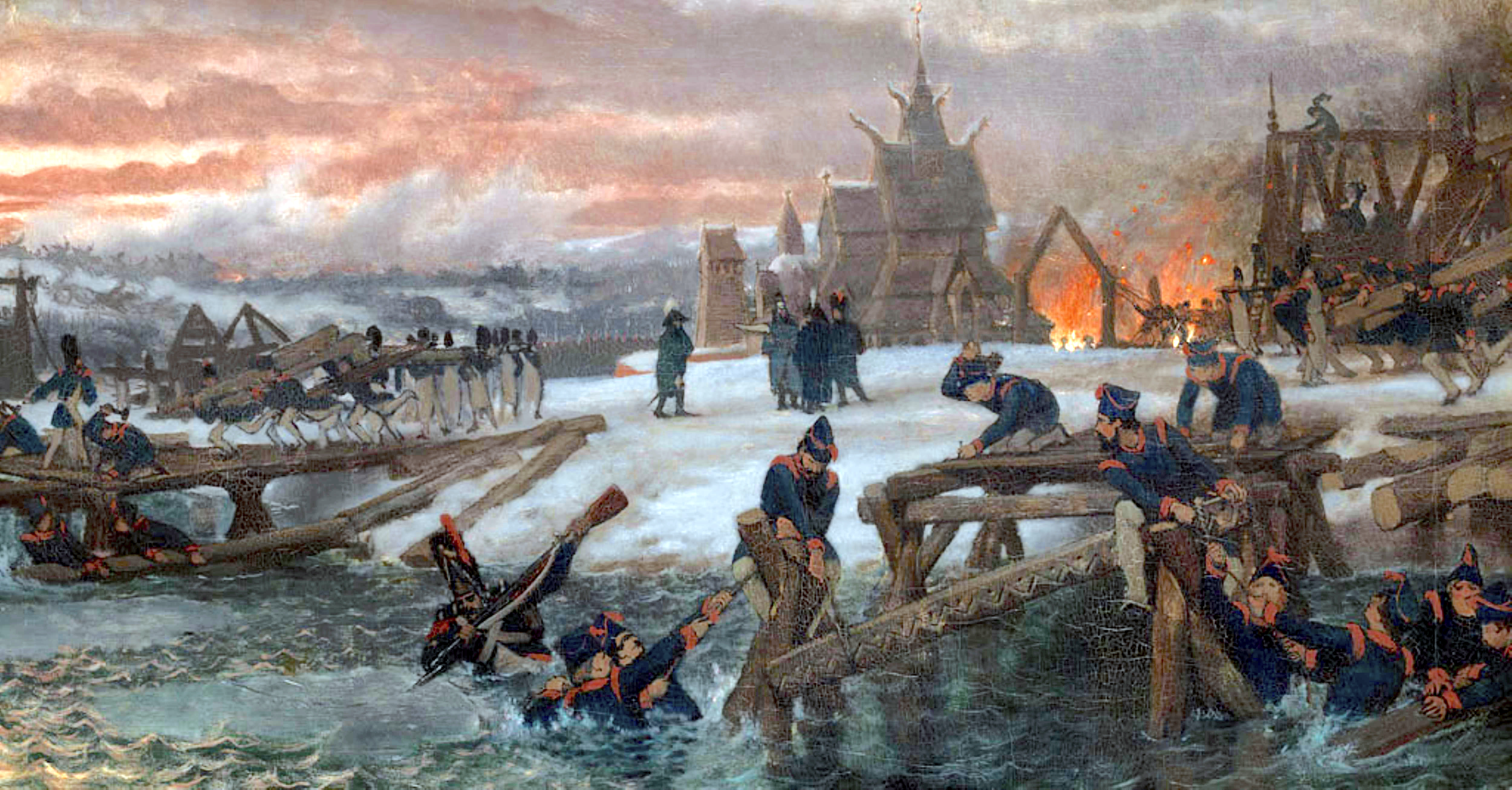
Dutch sappers of the Grande Armée during the Battle of Berezina in 1812

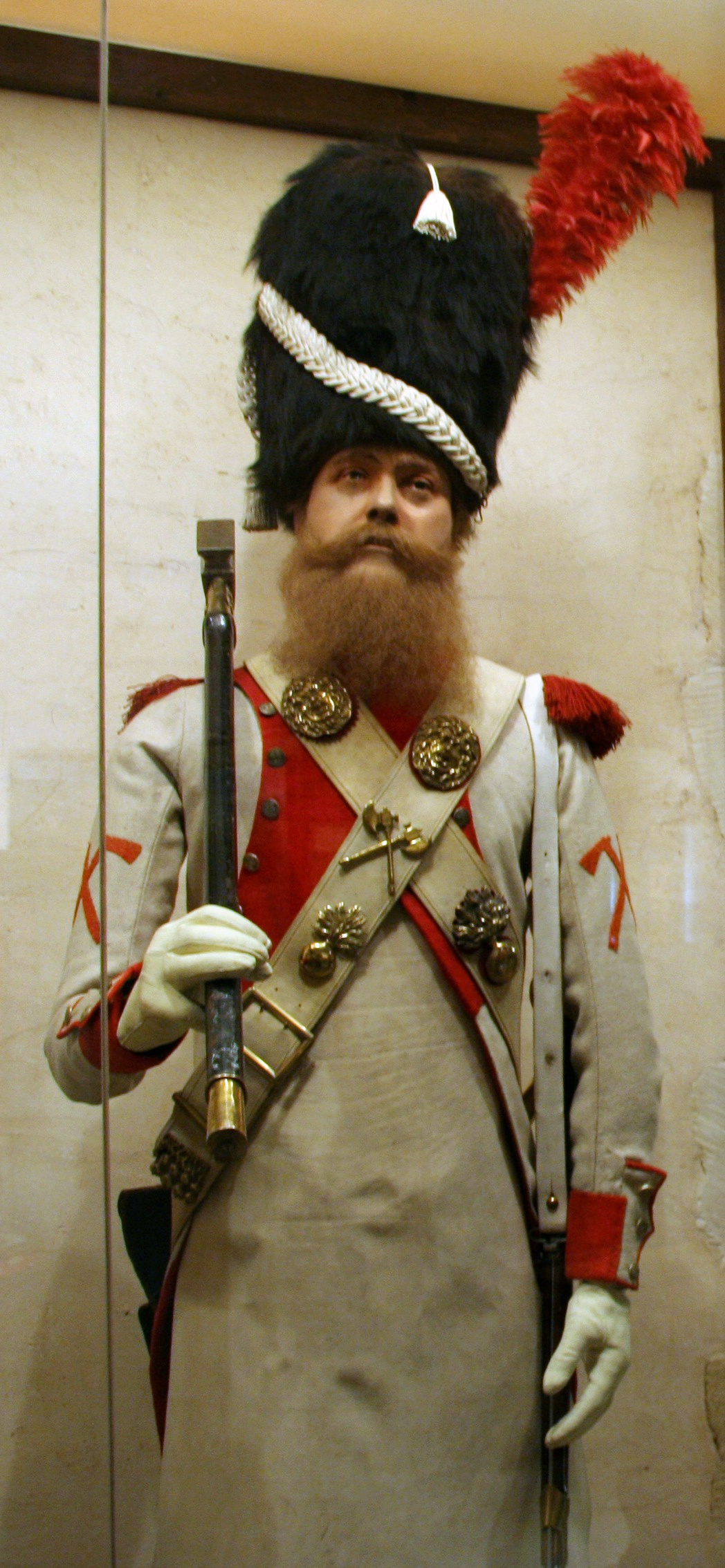
A French pioneer during the Napoleonic Wars (Château de l'Empéri, collection of the Army Museum of Paris)

While the glory of battle went to the cavalry, infantry, and artillery, the army also included military engineers of various types.

The bridge builders of the Grande Armée, the pontonniers, were an indispensable part of Napoleon's military machine. Their main contribution was helping the emperor to get his forces across water obstacles by erecting pontoon bridges. The skills of his pontonniers allowed Napoleon to outflank enemy positions by crossing rivers where the enemy least expected and, in the case of the great retreat from Moscow, saved the army from complete annihilation at the Berezina River.

Napoleon had 14 pontonniers companies commissioned into his armies, under the command of engineer, General Jean Baptiste Eblé. His training, along with their specialized tools and equipment, enabled them to quickly build the various parts of the bridges, which could then be rapidly assembled and reused later. All the needed materials, tools, and parts were carried on their wagon trains. If they did not have a part or item, it could be quickly made using the mobile wagon-mounted forges of the pontonniers. A single company of pontonniers could construct a bridge of up to 80 pontoons (a span of some 120 to 150 metres long) in just under seven hours.

In addition to the pontonniers, there were companies of sappers, to deal with enemy fortifications. They were used far less often in their intended role than the pontonniers. However, since the emperor had learned in his early campaigns (such as the Siege of Acre) that it was better to bypass and isolate fixed fortifications, if possible, than to directly assault them, the sapper companies were usually put to other tasks.

The different types of engineer companies were formed into battalions and regiments called Génie, which was originally a slang term for engineer. This name, which is still used today, was both a play on the word (jeu de mot) and a reference to their seemingly magical abilities to grant wishes and make things appear much like the mythical Genie.

=== Logistics ===
One of Napoleon's most quoted lines is his dictum that "An army is a creature which marches on its stomach", illustrating the vital importance of military logistics. The troops of the Grande Armée each carried four days' provisions. The supply wagon trains following them carried eight days', but these were to be consumed only in emergency. One man was allotted to 750 grams of bread, 550 grams of biscuits, 250 grams of meat, 30 grams of rice, and 60 grams of grain; one litre of wine was shared between four men. Insofar as possible, Napoleon encouraged his men to live off the land through foraging and requisition of food (which was known as La Maraude). An integral part of the French logistics system was the inclusion in every regiment of several women known as cantinières (also known as vivandières, but cantinière was by far the more common term among French troops). These women were married to soldiers in their regiments, and acted as sutlers, selling food and drink (especially alcohol) to the troops. They were considered "absolutely necessary" to the functioning of the army, and the Consular Decree of 7 Thermidor, Year VIII set their number at four per battalion and two per cavalry squadron. These women fed the troops when all other logistical arrangements broke down.

Additional supplies would be stockpiled and stored at forward bases and depots which Napoleon would establish before the start of his campaigns. These would then be moved forward as the army advanced. The supply bases of the Grande Armée would replenish the corps and divisional depots, which in turn would replenish the brigade and regimental supply trains, which would distribute rations and ammunition to the troops as needed to supplement their foraging. The reliance on foraging was sometimes determined by political pressures. When marching over friendly territory armies were told to "live off what the country can supply", but when marching over neutral territory they were issued with supplies. It was this system of planned and improvised logistics which enabled the Grande Armée to sustain rapid marches of up to 15 miles per day for up to five weeks. The logistical system was also aided by a technological innovation in the form of the food preservation technique invented by Nicolas Appert, which led to modern canning methods.

=== Medical Service ===
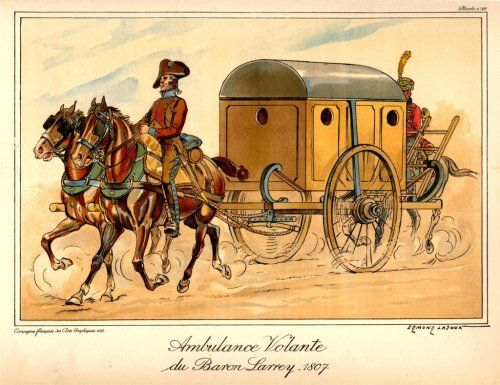
The Flying Ambulances were developed by French battlefield surgeon Dominque-Jean Larrey to rapidly transport the wounded from the battlefield to field hospitals.

The medical services had the least glory or prestige, but were required to deal with the full horrors of the war's aftermath. The technology and practice of military medicine did not advance significantly during the Napoleonic Wars, but the Grande Armée did benefit from improvements in organisation and mobility. The established practice was for the wounded to be collected and treated after the battle had ended, by which time many wounded soldiers would have died. The systems adopted by the French Army in the Revolutionary and Napoleonic period were the forerunners of almost all modern military ambulance and triage systems, being adopted by the armies of most other Western nations in the following decades.

The most significant innovation was the establishment of a system of ambulances volantes (flying ambulances) in the closing years of the 18th century by Dominique Jean Larrey (who would later become Surgeon-General of the Imperial Guard). His inspiration was the use of fast horse artillery, or "flying artillery", which could manoeuver rapidly around the battlefield to provide urgent artillery support, or to escape an advancing enemy. The flying ambulance was designed to follow the advance guard and provide initial dressing of wounds (often under fire), while rapidly transporting the critically injured away from the battlefield. The personnel for a given ambulance team included a doctor, quartermaster, non-commissioned officer, a drummer boy (who carried the bandages), and 24 infantrymen as stretcher bearers.

Another French military surgeon, Baron L.P. Percy, implemented another system. He was the first to introduce "a regularly trained corps of field litter bearers, soldiers regularly formed and equipped for the duty of picking up the wounded... and carrying them on stretchers to the place where means of surgical aid were provided". Percy's system essentially served as a method of moving surgeons and their instruments closer to the engaged forces from where stretcher bearers would retrieve the wounded, rather than placing an emphasis on evacuating the wounded to the rear in a vehicle.

During the Napoleonic Wars, every French regiment, division, and corps had its own medical staff, consisting of ambulance units, orderlies to perform nursing duties, apothecaries, surgeons, and doctors. Larrey was instrumental in reorganising military hospitals and making them more mobile. This was more than any other army would be able to offer until the 1850s and 1860s, half a century later. Knowing that they would be promptly attended to, then honored and well looked after once back home, helped boost morale in the Grande Armée, and thus further contributed to its fighting abilities. The most revolutionary aspect of the system was Larrey's attention to the wounded on both sides of the battlefield, a practice now enshrined in various Geneva Conventions. As stated in the Mémorial de Sainte-Hélène, "The Emperor had only the highest praise for Dr Larrey, declaring that he left him with the image of a truly good man who combined all the virtues of effective philanthropy and science to the highest degree. Every wounded soldier was a member of his family. Larrey is the most virtuous man I have ever met."

Despite these innovations, conditions in the Grande Armée, as in all armies of the time, were primitive at best. Far more soldiers died of their wounds or from sickness than in battle (see Napoleonic Wars casualties). There was little knowledge of hygiene and nothing of antibiotics. The main surgical procedure was amputation. The only crude form of anaesthetic readily available was a strong alcoholic drink, or even, in some cases, knocking the patient unconscious. Opiates such as laudanum were occasionally available for pain control. Typically, only about two-thirds survived such an operation, but this number increased with swift attention.

Accounts of the ordeals of the wounded are horrific reading. Napoleon himself once noted, "It requires more courage to suffer than to die", so he made sure those who did survive were given the best treatment available at hospitals in France, in particular Les Invalides, while they recuperated. The wounded survivours were often treated as heroes, awarded medals, pensions, and provided with prosthetic limbs if needed.

=== Communications ===
Most dispatches were conveyed as they had been for centuries, via messengers on horseback. Hussars, due to their bravery and riding skills, were often favoured for this task. Shorter range tactical signals could be sent visually by flags or audibly by drums, bugles, trumpets, and other musical instruments. Thus, standard bearers and musicians, in addition to their symbolic, ceremonial, and morale functions, also played important communication roles.

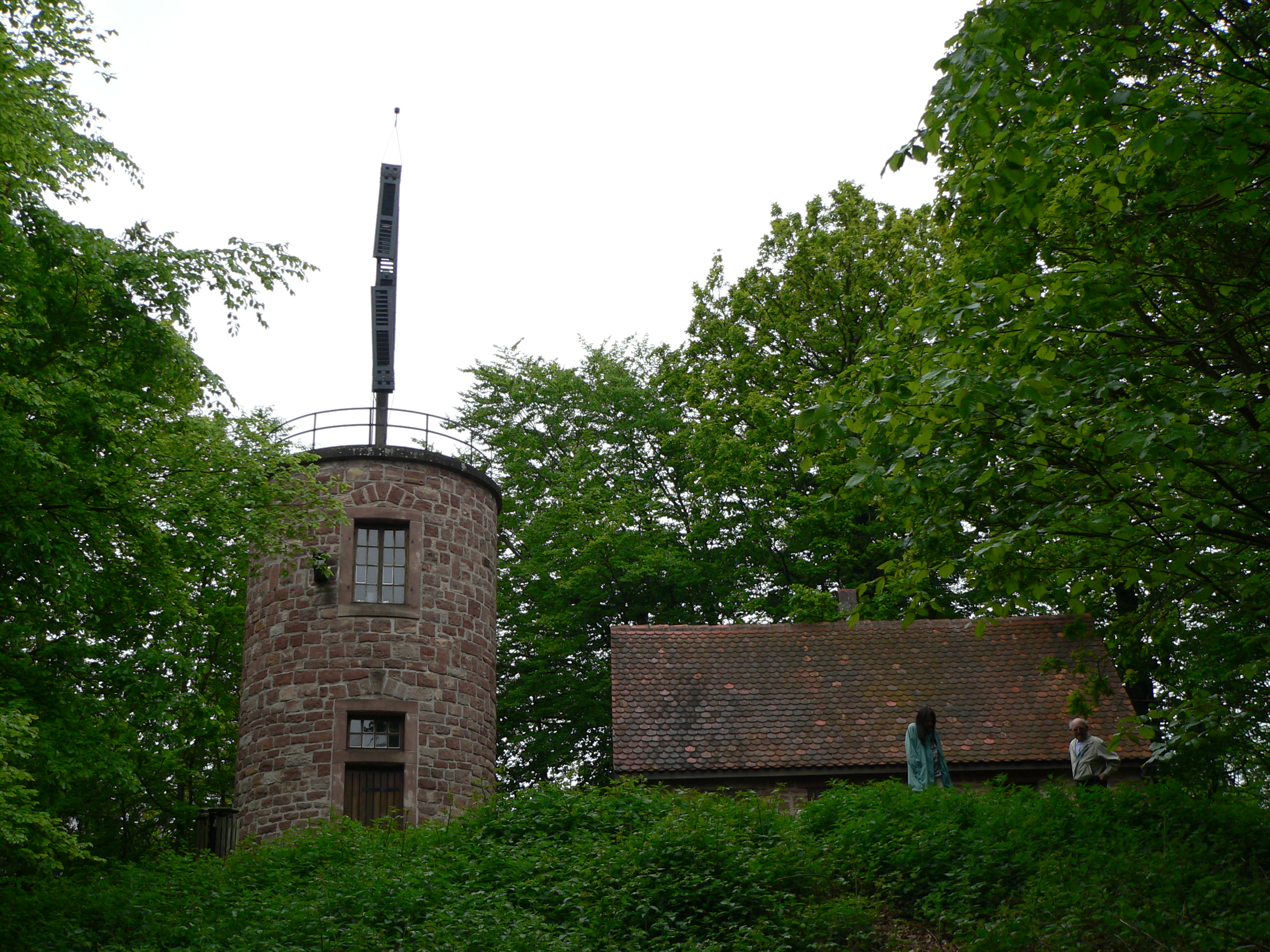
A Chappe semaphore tower near Saverne, France

The Grande Armée did benefit from innovations made in long-range communications during the French Revolution. The French Army was among the first to employ homing pigeons as messengers in any large and organised manner, and also the first to use observation balloons for reconnaissance and communications. But the real advance for conveying long-range dispatches came in the form of an ingenious optical telegraph Semaphore system invented by Claude Chappe.

Chappe's system consisted of an intricate network of small towers, within visual range of one another. On top of each was a 9-metre mast, with three large, movable wooden rods mounted on them. These rods, called the régulateur (regulator), were operated by trained crews using a series of pulleys and levers. The four basic positions of the rods could be combined to form 196 different "signs". Provided with good crews of operators and decent visibility conditions, a sign could be sent through the 15 station towers between Paris and Lille, a distance of 193 km (120 mi), in only 9 minutes, a complete message of 36 signs in about 32 minutes. From Paris to Venice, a message could be sent in only six hours.

Chappe's telegraph soon became one of Napoleon's favourite and most important secret weapons. A special portable version semaphore telegraph travelled with his headquarters. Using it, he was able to coordinate his logistics and forces over longer distances in far less time than his enemies. Work was even begun on a wagon-mounted version in 1812, but was not completed in time for use in the wars.

== Formations and tactics ==
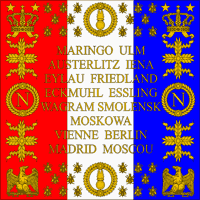
Banner of the 1st Regiment of Grenadier a Pied, showing the regiment's battle honours

While Napoleon is considered as a strategist and charismatic presence on the battlefield, he was also credited as a tactical innovator. He combined classic formations and tactics that had been used for thousands of years with more recent ones, such as Frederick the Great's "Oblique Order" (best illustrated at the Battle of Leuthen) and the "mob tactics" of the early Levée en masse armies of the Revolution. Napoleonic tactics and formations were highly fluid and flexible at first. In contrast, many of the Grande Armée's opponents were still wedded to a rigid system of "Linear" (or Line) tactics and formations, in which masses of infantry would simply line up and exchange vollies of fire, in an attempt to either blow the enemy from the field or outflank them. Due to the vulnerabilities of the line formations to flanking attacks, it was considered the highest form of military manoeuvre to outflank one's adversary. Armies would often retreat or even surrender if this was accomplished. Consequently, commanders who adhered to this system would place a great emphasis on flank security, often at the expense of a strong centre or reserve. Napoleon would frequently take full advantage of this linear mentality by feigning flank attacks or offering the enemy his own flank as "bait" (best illustrated at the Battle of Austerlitz and also later at Lützen), then throw his main effort against their centre, split their lines, and roll up their flanks. He always kept a strong reserve as well, mainly in the form of his Imperial Guard, which could deliver a "knockout blow" if the battle was going well or turn the tide if it was not.

Some of the widely used and effective formations and tactics included:

- Line (Ligne): The basic three rank line formation, best used for delivering volley fire and was also a decent melee formation for infantry or cavalry, but it was relatively slow moving and vulnerable on the flanks.
- March Column (Colonne de Marche): The best formation for rapid or sustained movement of troops and a good melee attacking formation, but it offered little firepower and was also vulnerable to flank attack, ambush, artillery, and "funneling".
- Wedge (Colonne de Charge): An arrow or spearhead shaped cavalry formation, designed to close rapidly and break the enemy's line. Classic and effective mounted formation used throughout history, and still used by tanks today. But if the wedge was halted, or its attack lost momentum, then it was vulnerable to counter-pincer movements on its flanks.
- Attack Column (Colonne d'Attaque): A wide column of infantry, almost a hybrid of line and column, with light infantry skirmishers in front to disrupt the enemy and screen the column's advance. Once the column closed, the skirmishers would move off to its flanks, then the column would fire a massed musket salvo and charge with their bayonets. An excellent formation against a standard, thin line. The Attack Column was developed from the "Mob" or "Horde" tactics of the early French Revolutionary Armies. Its disadvantages were a lack of massed firepower and vulnerability to artillery fire.
- Mixed Order (Ordre Mixte): Was Napoleon's preferred infantry formation. Some units (usually regiments or battalions in size) would be placed in line formation, with other units in attack column behind and in between them. This combined the firepower of the line with the speed, melee, and skirmishing advantages of the attack column. It also had some of the disadvantages of both, so support from artillery and cavalry were especially vital for this tactic to succeed.
- Open Order (Ordre Ouvert): Foot and/or horse would spread out by unit and/or individually. This formation was best for light troops and skirmishers. It allowed for rapid movement, especially over broken or rough terrain such as hills or forests, and offered the best protection from enemy fire since the troops were spread out. Its disadvantages were it did not allow for massed or volley fire and was terrible for melee or close quarters fighting and thus, especially vulnerable to cavalry.
- Square (Carré): Classic infantry formation for defence against cavalry. Soldiers would form a hollow square at least three or four ranks deep on each side, with officers and artillery or cavalry in the middle. It offered infantry their best protection against charges, especially on good defensive terrain such as on the top or reverse slope of a hill. Squares were slow moving, almost stationary targets, however. This, along with their density, made squares very vulnerable to artillery and to a lesser extent, infantry fire. Once broken, squares tended to completely collapse.
- Flying Battery (Batterie Volante): Designed to take advantage of the French artillery's mobility and training. A battery would move to one area on the field, lay down a short, sharp barrage, then rapidly redeploy to another area and fire another barrage, then quickly redeploy again, etc. The combined, cumulative effect of numerous batteries doing this all along the enemy's lines could be devastating. The horse artillery were especially well suited for this tactic. Napoleon used it to great success in the early campaigns of the Grande Armée. Its flexibility allowed him to quickly mass well-aimed fire anywhere it was needed. But it required superbly trained and conditioned artillerymen and horses as well as close command, coordination, and control in order to work.
- Grand Battery (Grande Batterie): An alternative artillery tactic, when circumstances prohibited the flying batteries. Artillery would mass its fire at a single, crucial point on the battlefield (usually against the enemy's centre). It could be devastating if the enemy was caught by surprise or in the open. But massing large numbers of guns in a single area without the enemy's knowledge could be tricky. Once the battery opened fire and its target became clear, measures could be taken to avoid it. It was also vulnerable to counter-battery fire from enemy artillery and needed protection from cavalry attack. Although this has become the most well known French artillery tactic, Napoleon preferred the flying batteries and used it only when he had to or thought it posed a better chance of success. Often at the start of a battle, he would mass batteries into a large battery, then after a few salvoes, break it up into flying batteries. In the early campaigns it was rarely used, but as the quantity of the horses of the Grande Armée and the quality of its artillerymen declined, Napoleon would be forced to employ it much more frequently in later battles.
- Boar's Head (Tête du Sanglier): Another hybrid formation, somewhat like the mixed order, but combining all three arms into a wedge-like square, which could be used for assault or defence. Infantry would form a short, but thick, line many ranks deep on the front, which would be the boar's "snout" (boutoir). Behind them would be two groups of artillery batteries or the "eyes" of the boar. On their flanks and behind them, in oblique order, would be other infantry in column, line, or square to form the boar's "face". Protecting their flanks and rear would be two groups of cavalry, which would serve as the boar's "tusk". This was a highly complex formation, which could not be formed as easily or quickly as the others. Once formed, except for the tusks, it had slow mobility. It was, however, faster moving than the traditional square and less vulnerable to artillery or infantry fire. The "tusks" also gave it stronger offensive capabilities. It would later be employed to great effect during the French conquests in North Africa during the 1830s and 1840s, and would be used up until the 1920s.

== Ranks of the Grande Armée ==
Maréchal d'Empire, or Marshal of the Empire, was not a rank within the Grande Armée, but a personal title granted to distinguished divisional generals, along with higher pay and privileges. The same applied to the corps commanders (General de Corps d'armee) and army commanders (General en chef). The highest permanent rank in the Grande Armée was actually Général de division and those higher than it were positions of the same rank but with separate insignia for appointment holders. The position of Colonel General of a branch (such as dragoons or grenadiers of the Guard) was akin to Chief Inspector-General of that branch, whose office holder used his current officer rank and its corresponding insignia.

According to Alain Pigeard, between 1792 and 1814 no fewer than 190 foreign-born soldiers, that is, around 6 per cent of the French Army's senior officers, were promoted to general, including Józef Poniatowski, who was appointed Marshal of the Empire during the Battle of Leipzig (1813), only to die less than 48 hours later.

Grande Armée ranks	Modern U.S./U.K./NATO equivalent
Honored titles
Maréchal d'Empire	Fieldmarshal
Colonel-Général (Position)	Commander of the branch
Flag commissioned officers
Général en Chef (this rank was abolished in 1812) See also: General-in-chief § France	Lieutenant general
Général de division, Lieutenant général (Ancien Régime rank reintroduced in 1814)	Major general
Général de brigade, Maréchal de camp (Ancien Régime rank reintroduced in 1814)	Brigadier general
Général Chef d'état Major (Position, not rank), Major-Général dans la Garde (Position, not rank)	—
Général Aide de Camps (Position, not rank)	—
Adjudant-commandant (Staff only rank)	Staff Colonel
Senior commissioned officers
Colonel, Chef de brigade (1793-1803)	Colonel
Colonel en second (from 1804)	Senior lieutenant colonel
Major (from 1803)	Lieutenant colonel
Major en second (from 1811)	Senior major
Lieutenant-colonel (before 1793), Chef de bataillon or Chef d'escadron (cavalry, horse artillery, gendarmerie and trains)	Major
Junior commissioned officers
Capitaine adjutant-major	Staff captain
Capitaine	Captain
Lieutenant	First lieutenant
Sous-lieutenant	Second lieutenant
Aspirant	Acting Officer
Non-commissioned officers
Adjudant (before 1791), Adjudant sous-officier (from 1791)	Warrant officer
Sergent-Major or Maréchal des logis Chef (cavalry, horse artillery, gendarmerie and trains)	First sergeant
Sergent or Maréchal des Logis (cavalry, horse artillery, gendarmerie and trains)	Sergeant
Enlisted ranks
Caporal-Fourrier or Brigadier-Fourrier (cavalry, horse artillery, gendarmerie and trains)	Company clerk/supply sergeant
Caporal or Brigadier (cavalry, horse artillery, gendarmerie and trains)	Corporal
Soldat or Grenadier or Chasseur or Voltigeur or Tirailleur etc. (infantry) or Dragon or Chasseur or Chevau-léger (cavalry) or Canonnier or Artilleur or Pontonnier (artillery) or Sapeur or Mineur (sappers) or Conducteur (trains)	Private
Soldat or Fusilier or Chasseur (infantry) or Canonnier or Artilleur or Pontonnier (artillery) or Sapeur or Mineur (sappers) or Conducteur (trains)	Private
Tambour or Sonneur or Clairon or Musicien	Military band

== See also ==
- British Army during the Napoleonic Wars
- French Imperial Eagle
- Legion of Honour
- List of French general officers (Peninsular War)
- Types of military forces in the Napoleonic Wars
- Uniforms of La Grande Armée
- Weapons of Honour
- Social background of officers and other ranks in the French Army, 1750–1815
- Spanish Army (Peninsular War)
- Economic and logistical aspects of the Napoleonic Wars
