= Jean Pierre Joseph Bruguière =

French soldier and officer (1772–1813)

Jean-Pierre-Joseph Bruguière
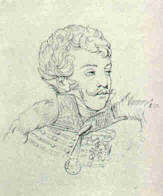
- Born: June 22, 1772; Sommières, France
- Died: June 5, 1813 (aged 40); Görlitz, Kingdom of Saxony
- Other name: Jean-Pierre-Joseph Bruyère
- Spouse: Josephine-Therese Virginie Berthier
- Relatives: Louis-Alexandre Berthier (uncle-in-law); César Berthier (father-in-law)
- Military career
- Allegiance: First French Republic; First French Empire
- Branch: French Revolutionary Army; French Imperial Army
- Service years: 1794–1813
- Rank: General de division
- Conflicts: French Revolutionary Wars; Napoleonic Wars: Battle of Reichenbach †
- Awards: Legion of Honour (Commandeur); Count of the Empire; Inscription under the Arc de Triomphe

Jean Pierre Joseph Bruguière, called Bruyère, (June 22, 1772 – June 5, 1813) was a French military officer. He served in the French Revolutionary Wars and eventually became a general and prominent cavalry commander during the Napoleonic Wars. He was mortally wounded by a cannonball at the Battle of Reichenbach.

== Biography ==
Jean Pierre Joseph Bruyère was born in Sommières on June 22, 1772. Coming from a family of medical professionals, for a time he studied medicine as well. After the French Revolution, in 1793, he became an aide in the French Armée d'Italie, enlisting in the 15th Light Infantry Demi-brigade in the next year and becoming a Sous-Lieutenant in 1795. In 1796 the Lieutenant began alternating between serving in the 7th and 6th Hussar regiments and staff duty for several years. He frequently was assigned as aide-de-camp to generals Barthélemy Catherine Joubert and Louis-Alexandre Berthier, serving in the Italian campaigns. He tied close connections to the latter officer, eventually marrying his niece Josephine-Therese Virginie (1794–1833), a daughter of his brother César Berthier, in 1810. Meanwhile, he was promoted to captain in 1797, Chef d'escadron after the Battle of Marengo in 1800, and Major in the 5th Hussar Regiment in 1803. In March 1804 he was awarded the Legion of Honour and a year later was named Colonel of the 23rd Mounted Chasseur Regiment.

In 1806 Bruyère distinguished himself at the Battle of Jena and was promoted to General de brigade on December 31. Over the next years he commanded cavalry brigades in various campaigns in Italy, Germany, and Austria; being wounded several times. He also became a part of the new military nobility in 1808, being made a Baron of the Empire, and eventually was named Commandant in the Legion. In 1809 he was promoted to General de division and led cavalry in the Armée d'Allemagne, first a division and then the whole light cavalry of said army. In 1811 he was named Count of the Empire. In 1812 he commanded the 1st Light Cavalry Division of the Grande Armee during the ill-fated French invasion of Russia, collecting further distinction and war wounds. He continued to lead the division in the German campaign of 1813, fighting at Bautzen. A day later, on May 22 at the Battle of Reichenbach, he was gravely wounded by a cannonball that took off his legs. He was brought to Görlitz where he died on June 5.

He later was inscribed as BRUYERE under the Arc de Triomphe in Paris, on the eastern pillar in column 16.

Baronial blason of Bruyère

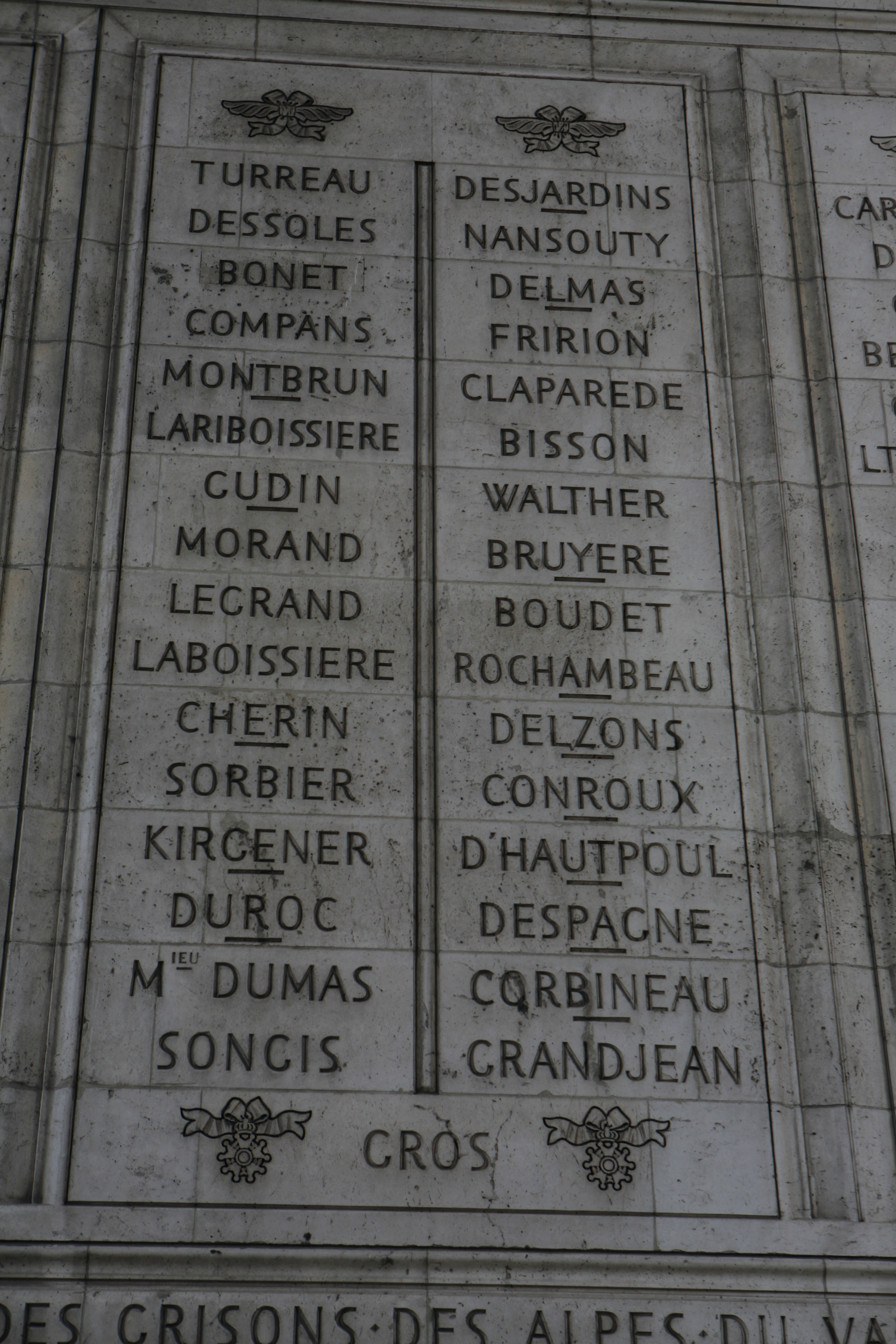
BRUYERE inscribed under the Arc de Triomphe

== See also ==
- List of French generals of the Revolutionary and Napoleonic Wars
