= French Imperial Army (1804–1815) =

Army of the First French Empire

- Armée Impériale Française
- Emblem of Napoleon Bonaparte
- Active: 1804–1814; 1815
- Country: France
- Allegiance: Napoleon I
- Type: Land forces
- Size: Total of 2,175,335 conscripted between 1805–1813
- Part of: (see organisation)
- Army Headquarters: Ministry of War Building, Paris, Île-de-France
- Mottos: Valeur et Discipline, 'Value and Discipline'
- Colors: Le Tricolore
- March: La Victoire est à nous (from the ballet-opera La caravane du Caire)
- Engagements: Haitian Revolution; War of the Third Coalition; War of the Fourth Coalition; Peninsular War; War of the Fifth Coalition; Russian campaign War of the Sixth Coalition; War of the Seventh Coalition

Commanders
- Supreme Commander: Napoleon I
- Notable commanders: See list: Pierre Augereau; Jean-Baptiste Bernadotte; Louis-Alexandre Berthier; Jean-Baptiste Bessières; Guillaume Brune; Louis-Nicolas Davout; Emmanuel de Grouchy; Charles-Étienne Gudin de La Sablonnière; Jean-Baptiste Jourdan; François Christophe de Kellermann; Jean Lannes; Antoine Charles Louis de Lasalle; Claude Juste Alexandre Legrand; François Joseph Lefebvre; Jacques MacDonald; Nicolas Joseph Maison; Auguste de Marmont; André Masséna; Édouard Mortier; Bon-Adrien Jeannot de Moncey; Joachim Murat; Étienne Marie Antoine Champion de Nansouty; Michel Ney; Nicolas Oudinot; Claude-Victor Perrin; Catherine-Dominique de Pérignon; Józef Antoni Poniatowski; Laurent de Gouvion Saint-Cyr; Louis-Vincent-Joseph Le Blond de Saint-Hilaire; Alexandre-Antoine Hureau de Sénarmont; Jean-Mathieu-Philibert Sérurier; Joseph Souham; Jean-de-Dieu Soult; Louis-Gabriel Suchet

The French Imperial Army (French: Armée Impériale) was the army of the First French Empire, which existed between 1804 and 1815. Renowned for its organization, discipline, and innovative tactics, it was considered one of the most formidable armies of its time. The Imperial Army was a highly diverse force, incorporating troops not only from France but also from allied and conquered territories across Europe. Its strength lay in its ability to adapt to different terrains and strategies, as well as its reliance on centralized command under Napoleon. The Imperial Army succeeded the French Revolutionary Army, and was in turn succeeded by the French Royal Army in 1815.

== History ==
The beginnings of the Imperial Army were seeded in the reorganisation of the French Army in 1803, which helped pave the way for the well-known French-style army organisation. Under this reorganisation, the old-style military district system was reorganised so that it included the new departments. These districts were known as 'Military Divisions', or divisions militaires, which were tasked with local administration of garrisons, recruitment, and providing National Guard and local forces for invasion.

The Imperial Army was divided into three separate types of commands: the largest was the Grande Armée, and its equivalent 'Field Armies', the next smallest were the Corps of Observation which were tasked with overseeing regions with strategic importance and providing rearguards where necessary, the next smallest was the 'Field Corps' which provided the actual fighting potential with the Field Armies, and finally, the Military Districts, as previously described.

In 1814, following the First Abdication of Napoleon, the army was quickly redesignated as the Royal Army (Armée Royale), and the structure (for the most part) remained, though with regimental name changes and slight uniform changes. After the Return of Napoleon in 1815, almost the entirety of the army (with the exception of some of the Royal Guard (formerly Napoleon's Imperial Guard)) went over to his side along with the majority of its staff. Though the 1815 campaign was a disaster for France, it is still seen by many military historians as a success, as France was able to form several field armies and win multiple battles, with almost no preparation whatsoever.

After Napoleon's second abdication, some elements of the army refused to give up, including the Armée de l'Ouest fighting an insurrection in the Vendée, the Corps of Observation of the Alpes, and the Imperial Guard (including the Minister of War, Marshal Louis-Nicolas Davout, who retired westward to join the hastily formed Armée de la Loire. However, following the end of the Hundred Days, the remainder of the Armée de la Loire was disbanded along with any troops of the Army. The only remaining elements were the board of directors and those soldiers who had no families and were too old to leave. Part of King Louis XVIII's plan to remove the imperial stain was to completely reconstitute the army on a new regional basis and destroy the imperialist esprit-de-corps.This marked the effective disbandment of the Imperial Army.

== Command, control and organization ==
The Imperial Headquarters, also known as the Grand Quartier-Général (general headquarters), was organized into three primary divisions: the Maison, which represented Napoleon's personal staff (i.e., his military household); the general staff of the Grande Armée (Quartier-Général de la Grande Armée); and the general commissary of army stores, which managed all aspects of logistics, including provisioning, transportation, and supply distribution. Alongside these main branches, several ancillary staffs were attached to the Imperial Headquarters, including representatives from the foreign ministry (commonly a secretary of state), the independent headquarters for the artillery and engineering commanders, and the staff of the Imperial Guard, which had grown to the size of an independent army by 1812.

The Maison was tasked with implementing Napoleon's strategic plans. The second most important figure in this branch was the Grand Marshal of the Palace, who oversaw the Maison's organization, followed by the Master of Horse. Below them was a group of unattached generals (capable of fulfilling various assignments), aides-de-camp (most of whom were generals), and a large personal staff. This included Napoleon's senior bodyguard, the Mameluke Roustam Raza, as well as the staffs of high-ranking officers. At the core of the Maison was the cabinet, a secretarial team responsible for transmitting orders and maintaining communication between Napoleon, the Grande Armée, and the ministers. A key element of the Maison was the Bureau Topographique (Topographical Office), which served as the army's planning center. This office managed the campaign map table—updated with colored pins to track movements—and maintained the carnets. These were detailed notebooks that recorded every relevant piece of information about each regiment in Napoleon's army, as well as intelligence on enemy forces. The carnets were updated daily and rewritten every two weeks to ensure accuracy, providing Napoleon with a near-perfect overview of the battlefield situation.

When on campaign or during battles, Napoleon operated with his "little headquarters", a compact field HQ comprising carefully chosen staff members. This group included the chief of staff, master of horse, the marshal of the day (acting as duty officer), two aides-de-camp, two orderly officers, an equerry, a page (who carried Napoleon's telescope), a groom, Roustam, a cavalry trooper with a folio of maps, and an interpreter. This team was preceded by two orderly officers with a small escort of cavalry, while four squadrons of Guard cavalry followed roughly 1,000 yards behind. To ensure mobility, the Master of Horse was responsible for maintaining a relay of fresh horses at every level down to the Corps, ensuring the "little headquarters" was always operational.

The general staff, while critical, was less efficient than the Maison. It suffered from internal disorganization, overlapping responsibilities, and occasional neglect of certain duties. Under the leadership of the chief of staff, its primary role was to execute Napoleon's directives, as the planning and decision-making authority remained entirely centralized with Napoleon himself. The chief of staff managed two subordinate offices: the private staff and the Cabinet of the chief of staff. These offices were tasked with processing and issuing Napoleon's orders regarding troop movements and military operations, supported by a team of generals, colonels, and lower-ranking aides-de-camp.

The general staff was divided into three main departments, though their roles often overlapped. The 1st Section focused on clerical work, including issuing orders and maintaining records. The 2nd Section handled matters such as accommodation for headquarters staff, security, hospitals, and food supplies. The latter task was coordinated with the Grand Commissary of Army Stores, who had his own commissariat staff. The 3rd Section managed prisoners of war, conscription, and legal matters. Additionally, an unofficial fourth branch, the Army Topographical Department, was responsible for maps and related duties.

=== Minister of war ===
The duties of the Minister of War were described by historian Ronald Pawley as follows: "... he was responsible for all matters such as personnel, the ministerial budget, the emperor's orders regarding troop movements within the empire, the departments of artillery and engineers, and prisoners of war". When the first Minister, Louis-Alexandre Berthier was on campaign during the Ulm campaign, three members of the ministry replaced him as effective minister. Monsieur Antoine Denniée pére, became effective acting minister, Monsieur Gérard became responsible for the movements of units stationed within the borders of France (intendent general of the Army), and Monsieur Michel Tabarié, director general of the Personnel Department.

- Ministry of War Headquarters, at the Ministry of Defense Building in Paris, France
  - Minister of war
  - Ministry of War Administration
    - Intendant general of the Army (Jean François Aimé Dejean, 1802–1810; Jean-Gérard Lacuée, Comte de Cessac 1810–13; and Pierre Antoine Noël Bruno 1813–14 & 1815)
      - Director general for supplies (Augustin Louis Petiet, 1804–06; Jacques-Pierre Orillard de Villemanzy, 1806; Pierre Antoine Noël Bruno, 1806–12; Guillaume-Mathieu Dumas, 1812–14; Jean-Pierre-Paulin-Hector Daure, 1815)
      - Chief organizing commissioners
        - Gendarmerie Department
        - Hospitals Department
        - Transport Department
        - Supplies & Rations Department
        - Support Department
  - Director general of reviews of conscription (Jean-Gérard Lacuée, Comte de Cessac, 1806–10;, Guillaume-Mathieu Dumas, 1810–12; and Étienne Hastrel de Rivedoux, 1812–14)
  - 6 x inspectors in chief of reviews (divisional generals)
  - 30 x inspectors of reviews (brigade generals)
  - 100 x sub-inspectors of reviews (colonels)
  - Assistant sub-inspectors, 1st class (Chefs de Bataillons) – posts created in 1811
  - Assistant sub-inspectors, 2nd class (captains)
  - War commissaires

=== Corps d'armée ===
The corps d'armée, typically numbering between 15,000 and 70,000 soldiers, served as the cornerstone of Napoleon's military organization. Functioning as a fully autonomous army, it included two or more infantry divisions, a cavalry division, and all essential support units. These support units encompassed engineering detachments, additional corps transport to complement that of the divisions, and a corps artillery reserve where the heavier artillery pieces were generally concentrated. Once Napoleon established a centralized cavalry reserve, the cavalry within a corps d'armée primarily consisted of light regiments. (Note: These light regiments were specifically trained for tasks like skirmishing and reconnaissance, offering the corps vital scouting capabilities. In contrast, heavy cavalry regiments were typically deployed during large-scale battles involving multiple corps, where their role was to engage in massed cavalry actions.) The cavalry's mobile horse artillery was directly assigned to the cavalry division rather than being part of the corps' central artillery reserve. Leadership of the corps d'armée was generally entrusted to a marshal, supported by a fully equipped staff responsible for administrative duties and maintaining communication with the subordinate divisions.

=== Division and brigade ===
A division, comprised 16,000 personnel under the command of a general, typically consisting of two or more brigades. Each division was supported by a divisional transport train and a divisional artillery reserve. Each division had its own staff. The staff consisted generally of three aides-de-camp (the senior of whom was a chef de bataillon), an adjutant-commandant as chief of staff, three adjoints, possibly an attached Polish officer, and the officer commanding the division's artillery. In addition there could also a sous-inspecteur des revues and a commissaire-ordinaire, along with their respective assistants included A brigade typically commanded by a Brigadier. The brigade had a variable number of regiments or battalions (not all the battalions of a regiment necessarily served together), cavalry brigades normally comprised two or three regiments. Being tactical organizations with no administrative functions, a brigade's staff consisted of a single aide-de-camp, to whom might be added one ordinance officer (officier d'ordonnance) temporarily detailed from one of its regiments.

=== Demi-brigade/regiment ===
Since the term regiment had monarchist connotations it was replaced in 1794 with the new term of Demi-brigade. In 1803 Regiment came into official use once again, and demi-brigade was applied specifically to provisional units. Each Demi-brigade/regiment between 1200 and 3300 men strong consisted of three battalions; one battalion was of light infantry. A Demi-brigade/regiment had its own staff comprising a colonel (chef de brigade) a quartermaster-treasurer two adjutants-majors and three assistant non-commissioned officers (adjutants sous officier).

=== Battalion and company ===
Battalions (Note: the battalions of the line infantry were dubbed Demi-brigade/regiment de Bataille and Demi-brigade/regiment légère for light infantry.) each consisted of eight fusilier companies and one grenadier company, plus a regimental artillery company. A company was commanded by a captain and had a strength of 122 men and officer. The grenadier companies were half of that size. From September 1804, onwards each battalion had its own light voltigeur company created from the conversion of the fusilier company. On 18 February 1808 a new organisation was introduced. By this decree, each regiment was to consist of four bataillons de guerre (service battalions) and a depot battalion, the latter of only four companies commanded by a captain, with a major in command of the depot itself. The regimental staff was composed of a colonel, a major, five adjutants-majors, a quartermaster treasurer, a paymaster, a surgeon-major and nine assistants, ten adjutants sous-officiers, as well as several musicians and craftsmen. Each bataillon de guerre (commanded by a chef de bataillon) was now composed of only six companies: four fusilier, one grenadier and one voltigeur, each company commanded by a captain, consisted of 139 officer and men.

== Conscription and training ==
The recruitment of the Grande Armée was based on the "Levée en masse" the mass conscription. All men between 18 and 40 years were obliged to register, and those between 18 and 25 (later 30) were liable to be drafted in annual classes who were to serve five years or the duration of a campaign. In order to guarantee a constant supply of troops and alleviating the military demands on the French people Napoleon introduced the French conscription system in annexed lands (pays réunis) and satellite states (pays conquis).

Conscripts were divided into five age groups, ranging from twenty to twenty-five years old. There were many exemptions on medical grounds, such as loss of sight or hearing, or loss of an arm or leg. Other exemptions were more specific, such as the absence of teeth, which prevented cartridges from being torn open, or the mutilation of the thumb or index finger. Other exemptions were granted to ecclesiastics, maritime registrants and arms factory workers. Substitutions were authorised, but the substitute had to be from the same department, comply with the conscription law, be under thirty years of age, be at least 1.64 metres (5 ft 5 in) tall, and have no criminal record. If the substitute was discharged or deserted within six months of joining the army, the conscript would have to provide another substitute or serve in his place. The price of the replacement would be determined by mutual agreement.

As a rule, a written contract was concluded between the parties. The number of conscripts was determined by decree. The conscripts were allocated to the individual departments and municipalities according to population size. There, the mayor drew up a list of all the citizens concerned. If the number of conscripts outnumbered those called up, the decision was made by drawing lots. Each conscript was allocated a number. The numbers corresponding to the quota set by the decree were presented to a recruitment council, which decided on exemptions and replacements. Once a recruit was selected he was sent to a military depot. At the depots, recruits received eight days of training, learning how to march and load and fire their muskets. During wartime, recruits received minimal formal training and often departed for the front within a week of being enlisted. After marching to their destination in short stages and undergoing drills during afternoon breaks, they arrived at the battlefront after 50 or 60 days, reasonably disciplined and ready to begin their combat training.

Officers of Napoleon's Grande Armée were recruited and trained through a combination of merit, military experience, and social connections. Unlike the aristocratic armies of the Ancien Régime, which largely reserved officer positions for noble families, the Grande Armée embraced the revolutionary ideals of meritocracy. This shift was partly due to the French Revolution, which swept away the rigid class barriers of the old order, creating opportunities for talented individuals from lower social backgrounds to rise through the ranks.

Many officers earned their commissions on the battlefield rather than through formal education or family privilege. Soldiers who displayed exceptional bravery, leadership, and competence were often promoted directly from the ranks. This pragmatic approach allowed Napoleon to fill his officer corps with men who had proven their abilities under fire, ensuring a high level of practical experience and loyalty.

Formal military education also played a significant role in the recruitment and training of officers. Institutions such as the École Militaire in Paris and the École Polytechnique provided rigorous training in mathematics, engineering, and military strategy. These schools produced highly skilled officers, particularly in technical branches like artillery and engineering, which Napoleon himself valued greatly. His own background as an artillery officer underscored his belief in the importance of technical expertise.

In addition to battlefield promotions and formal education, some officers were appointed based on their political loyalty to Napoleon. This was especially true in the later years of the empire, as the demands of constant warfare and the need to secure political stability led to the appointment of individuals who could be relied upon to support the regime. However, even these politically appointed officers were often required to demonstrate a certain level of competence to maintain their positions.

Training for officers was both theoretical and practical. Those who attended military schools received instruction in subjects such as geometry, fortifications, and military history, as well as rigorous physical training. On the battlefield, junior officers learned from experience, guided by the example of their superiors. The Grande Armée's operational style emphasized rapid movement, coordination, and decisive action, and officers were expected to master these principles through hands-on experience.

== Types of units ==
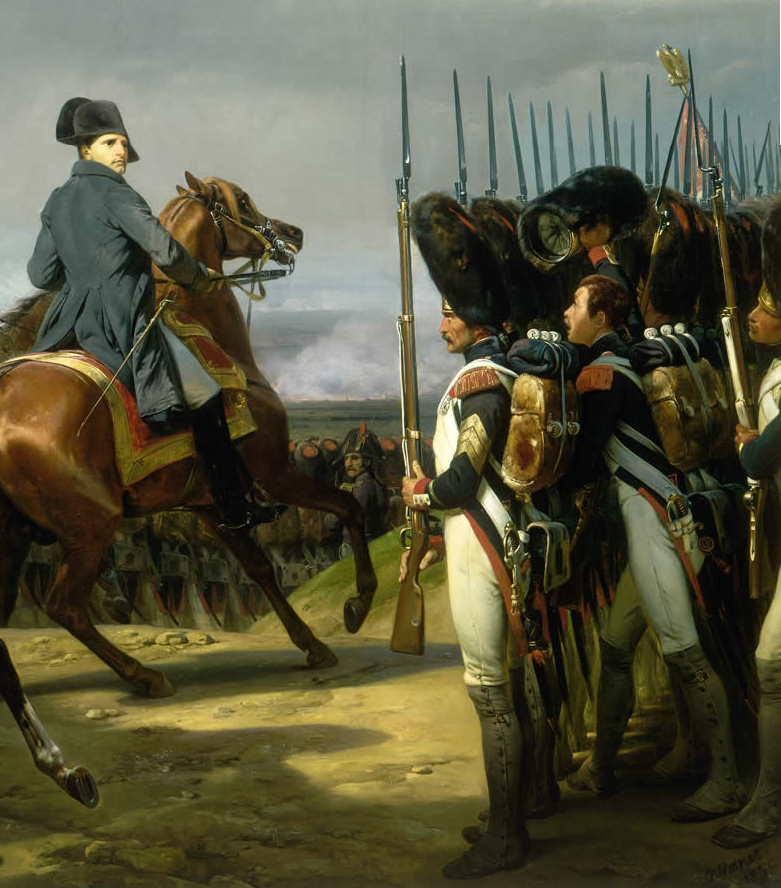
The Imperial Guard, inspected by Napoleon I, during the Battle of Jena.

=== Imperial Guard ===
The Imperial Guard (Garde Impériale) was the senior branch of the army, consisting of the senior troops and those who had distinguished themselves during battle, however (rather ironically) the guard consisted of some of the youngest regiments of the army. Their history is thus relatively short and simple compared to the ancient regiments of the line, many of which were raised in the 16th century. The life span of most of the guard regiments was also very short: a royal decree of 12 May 1814 (just after the Treaty of Fontainebleau) completely disbanded the Young Guard, and the units were broken up and distributed among the line. Certain units were attached to the guard in 1813, for example, the Saxon Life Grenadier Guards (Saxe Leibgrenadiergarde) and a battalion of Polish grenadiers, but these were not part of the guard and did not wear the guard button. The guard was separated into three 'echelons', of which each consisted many different types of units, these consisted of the Old Guard, the Middle Guard, and the Young Guard. This effectively made the guard an independent fighting corps with everything from its own staff down to its own support units.

=== Light Infantry ===
France began to experiment with light infantry in 1740 and several legions were raised by 1749. At the same time, a battalion of Chasseurs à Pied (literally Hunters on Foot) was attached to each of the six newly raised regiments of Chasseurs à Cheval (literally Hunters on Horses/ Mounted Hunters). In 1788 these battalions were separated from the cavalry, and six more were raised to give 12 Chasseurs battalions in the army. They were designed to perform scouting duties and to act as advance and rear guards.

=== Chasseurs ===
On 14 March 1803, under that year's reform, it was ordered that each light infantry battalion was to consist of one Carabinier (Grenadier equivalent), eight Chasseur (Fusilier equivalent), and one Voltigeur. Chasseurs effectively had the same role of the fusiliers, but were shorter and were quickly and typically more agile.

=== Cavalry ===
Napoleon maintained a strict hierarchy of cavalry classifications, each with its own specialist role. While some of these formations were similar to those that existed prior to the Revolution, the distinctions were refined in the Napoleonic system. The combat quality of a French cavalryman during the Napoleonic Wars was generally inferior to that of the British, Austrians, Russians, Poles, and Germans. This is how Archduke Charles and Antoine-Henri Jomini, for example, referred to the French cavalry. The French's lack of training in horsemanship had a definite impact on their tactics, forcing them to stick together and concentrate in masses. Napoleon's superb command structure and organization ensured that the French cavalry had reserves and the ability to deploy them to exploit a breakthrough in the enemy line, close a gap in their own line, or counterattack a "victorious" enemy. Their discipline and tactics in using larger formations (cavalry divisions and cavalry corps) impressed even France's most ardent enemies. The Duke of Wellington once said: "I considered our cavalry so inferior to the French from the want of order, that although I considered 1 squadron a match for 2 French, I did not like to see 4 British opposed to 4 French: and as the numbers increased and order, of course, became more necessary I was the more unwilling to risk our men without having a superiority in numbers."

Heavy cavalry, or cuirassiers, were primarily responsible for conducting frontal charges aimed at breaking enemy infantry or cavalry lines. Heavy cavalry were concentrated into autonomous divisions, usually within corps of 'reserve cavalry', enabling them to be assembled on the battlefield and act as huge, compact masses.

The second category of Napoleon's cavalry were the dragoons, originally mounted infantry. Their primary purpose was to provide mobile firepower, often serving as a flexible force to secure key positions, reinforce flanks, or skirmish. Numerically the largest of the cavalry were the light regiments, chasseurs a cheval, hussars and later chevau-légers-lanciers (lancers). They were capable of carrying out a general charge, yet their particular skills were geared towards independent action. They provided reconnaissance for the army, raided the enemy and served as the army's advance and rear guard. They also protected the army's flanks and communications, and most significantly screened the army's size and movements from the enemy.

==== Cuirassiers ====
The heavy cavalry, wearing a heavy cuirass (breastplate) and helmets of brass and iron and armed with straight long sabres, pistols, and later carbines. Like medieval knights, they served as mounted shock troops. Because of the weight of their armour and weapons, both the trooper and the horse had to be big and strong, and could put a lot of force behind their charge. Though the cuirass could not protect against direct musket fire, it could deflect ricochets and shots from long range, and offered some protection from pistol shots. More importantly, the breastplates protected against the swords and lances of opposing cavalry. Napoleon often combined all of his cuirassiers and carabiniers into a cavalry reserve, to be used at the decisive moment of the battle. In this manner, they proved to be an extremely potent force on the battlefield. The British, in particular, who mistakenly believed the cuirassiers were Napoleon's bodyguards, and would later come to adapt their distinctive helmets and breastplates for their own Household Cavalry. There were originally 25 cuirassier regiments, reduced to 12 by Napoleon initially who later added three more. At the beginning of his rule, most of the cuirassier regiments were severely understrength, so Napoleon ordered the best men and horses to be allocated to the first 12 regiments, while the rest were reorganized into dragoons.

==== Dragoons ====
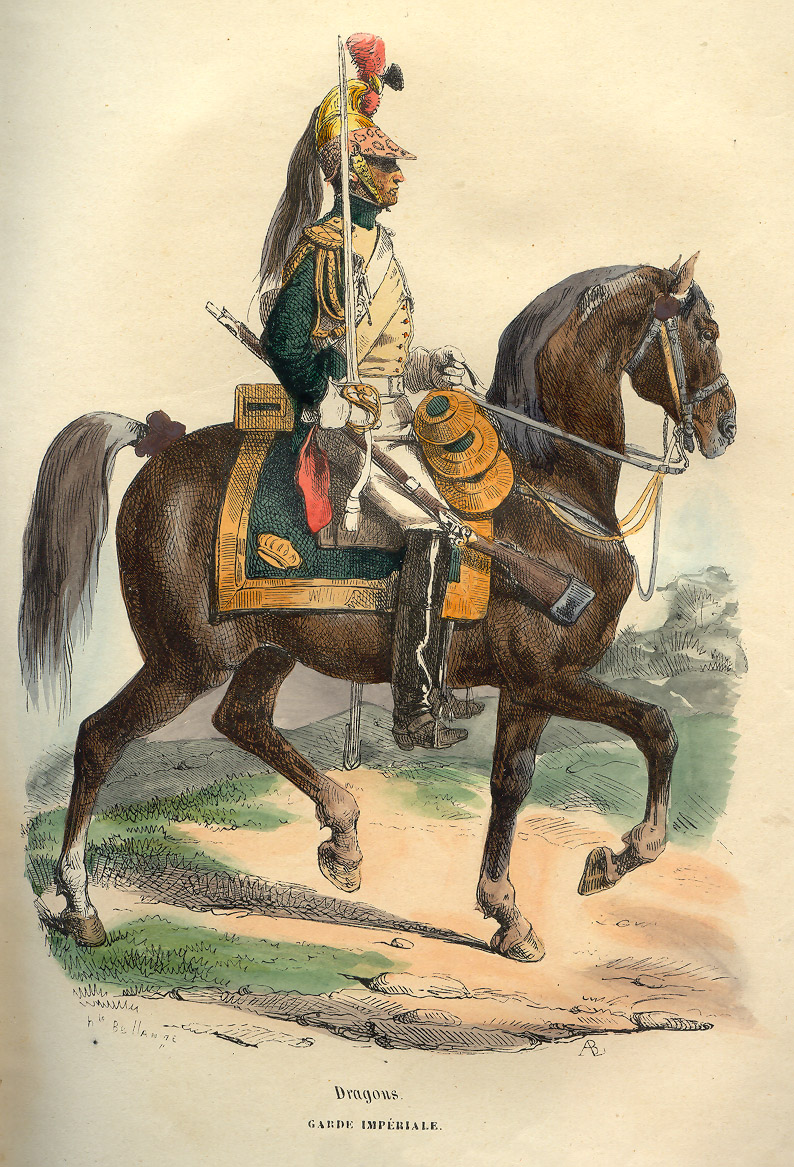
A dragoon from Napoleon's Empress's Dragoons of the Imperial Guard

The medium-weight mainstays of the French cavalry, although considered heavy cavalry, they were used for battle, skirmishing, and scouting. They were highly versatile being armed not only with distinctive straight swords, but also muskets with bayonets enabling them to fight as infantry as well as mounted, though fighting on foot had become increasingly uncommon for dragoons of all armies in the decades preceding Napoleon. The versatility of a dual-purpose soldier came at the cost of their horsemanship and swordsmanship often not being up to the same standards as those of other cavalry. Finding enough large horses proved a challenge. Some infantry officers were even required to give up their mounts for the dragoons, creating resentment towards them from this branch as well. There were 25, later 30, dragoon regiments. In 1815, only 15 could be raised and mounted in time for the Waterloo campaign.

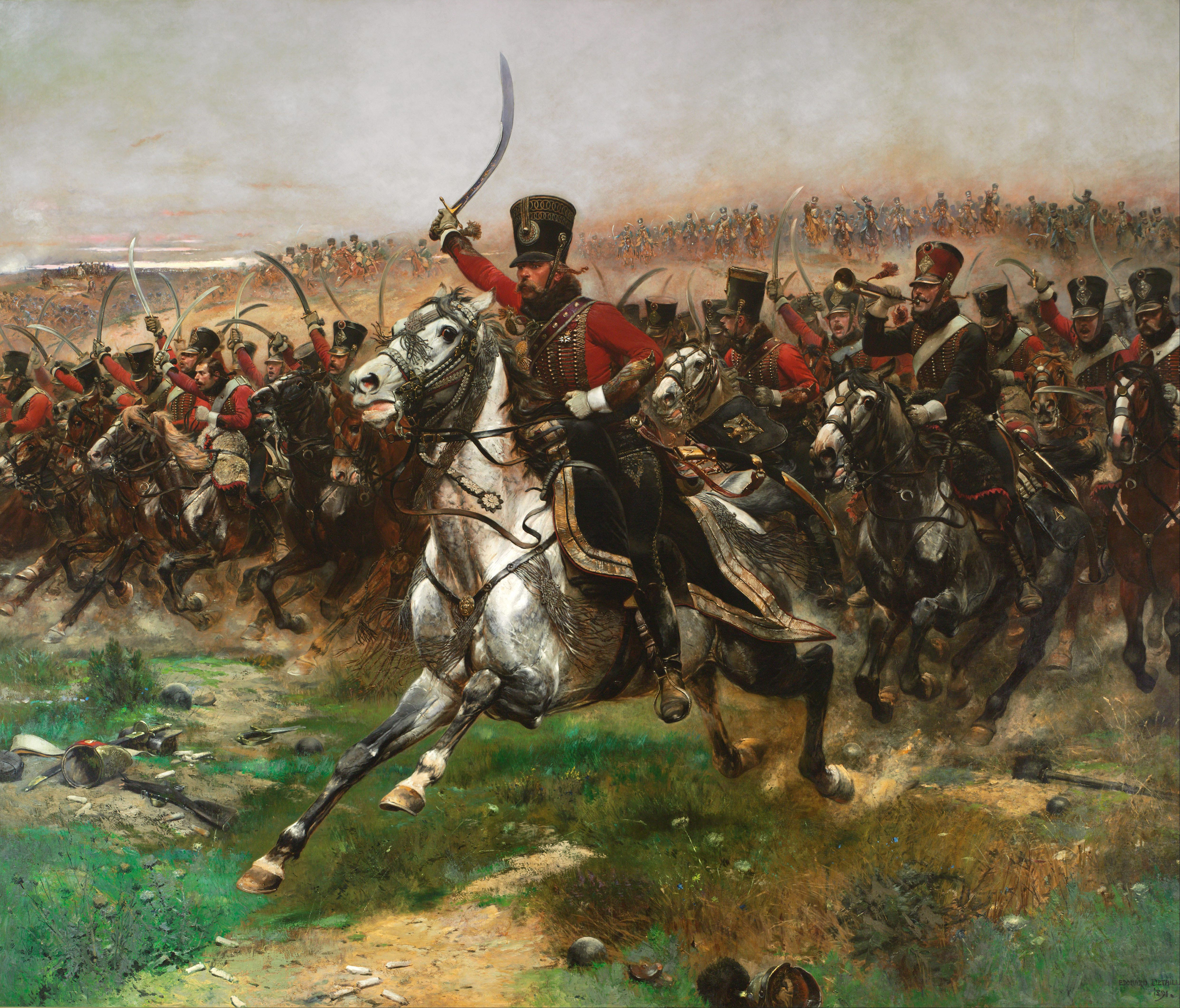
Vive L'Empereur, painting by Édouard Detaille in 1891, depicting the French 4th Hussar Regiment conducting a cavalry charge at the Battle of Friedland

==== Hussars ====
Hussars were light cavalry used primarily for reconnaissance and disruption. They regarded themselves as the best horsemen and swordsmen (beau sabreurs) in the entire Grande Armée. This opinion was not entirely unjustified and their flamboyant uniforms reflected their panache. They were used for reconnaissance, skirmishing, and screening for the army to keep their commanders informed of enemy movements. They had reputations for reckless bravery to the point of being almost suicidal, while being minimally armed. It was said by their most famous commander General Antoine Lasalle that a hussar who lived to be 30 was truly an old guard and very fortunate. Lasalle was killed at the Battle of Wagram at age 34. There were 10 regiments in 1804, with an 11th added in 1810 and two more in 1813.

=== Artillery ===
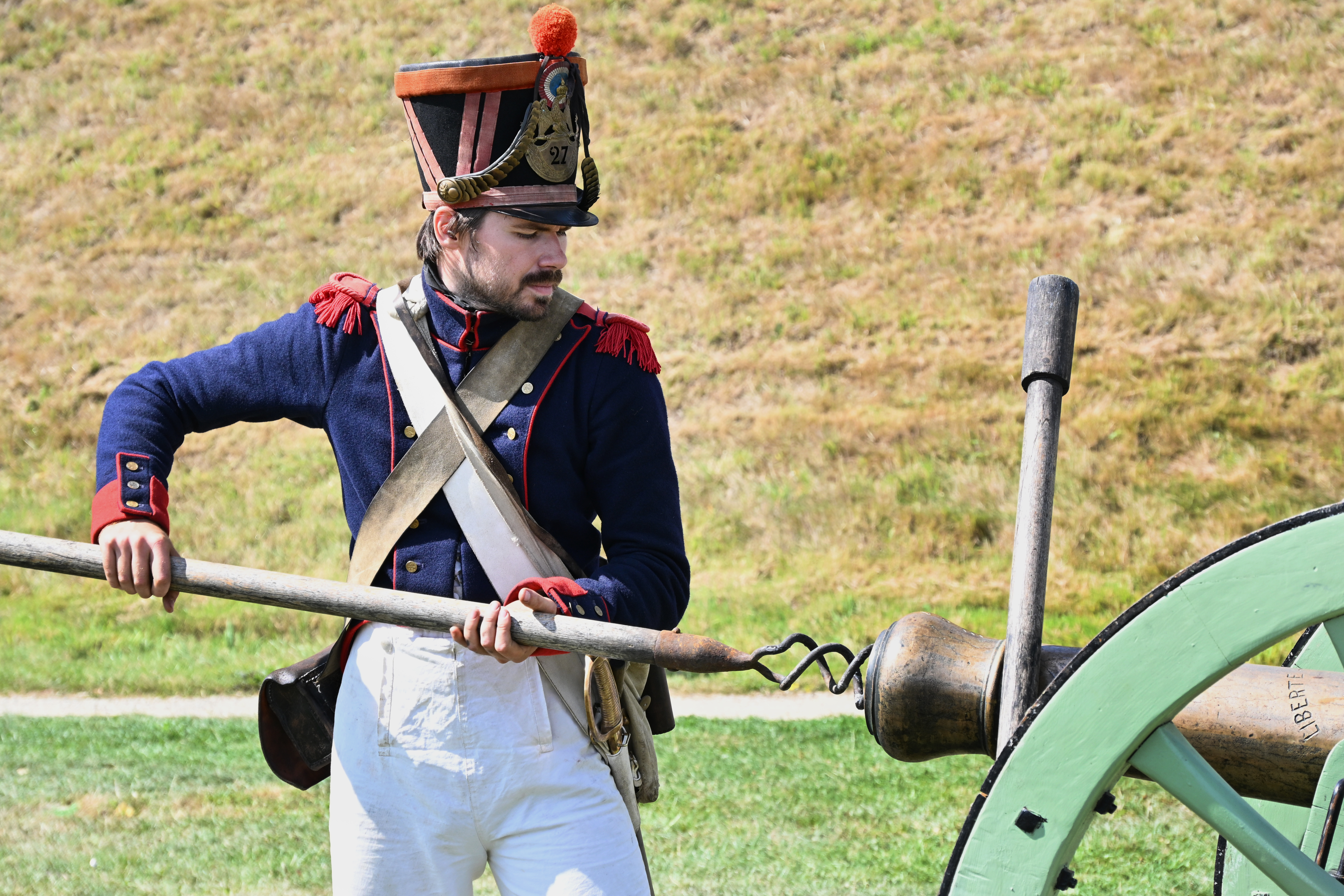
An actor at the Lion's Mound in Waterloo in 2025 reenacts the preparation of a cannon.

French cannons were the backbone of the French Imperial Army, possessing the greatest firepower of the three arms. Utilised in massed batteries (or grandes batteries) to soften up enemy formations before French infantry or cavalry engaged. Excellent gun-crew training allowed Napoleon to move weapons quickly from different firing positions, allowing adaptability in their use. Emperor Napoleon himself was once an artillery officer, and once said: "God is on the side with the best artillery".

Besides superior training, Napoleon's artillery was also greatly aided by the numerous technical improvements to French cannons by general Jean Baptiste de Gribeauval which made them lighter, faster, and much easier to sight, as well as strengthened the carriages and introduced standard-sized calibres. In general, French guns were 4-pounders, 8-pounders, or 12-pounders and 6-inch (150 mm) howitzers with the lighter calibres being phased out and replaced by 6-pounders later in the Napoleonic Wars. French cannons had brass barrels and their carriages, wheels, and limbers were painted olive green. Superb organisation fully integrated the artillery into the infantry and cavalry units it supported, yet also allowed it to operate independently if the need arose. There were two basic types, Artillerie à pied (foot artillery) and Artillerie à cheval (horse artillery).

==== Foot artillery ====
As the name indicates, these gunners marched alongside their guns, which were, of course, pulled by horses when limbered (undeployed). Hence, they travelled at the infantry's pace or slower. In 1805, there were eight, later ten, regiments of foot artillery in the Grande Armée plus two more in the Imperial Guard, but unlike cavalry and infantry regiments, these were administrative organisations. The main operational and tactical units were the batteries (or companies) of 120 men each, which were formed into brigades and assigned to the divisions and corps. Every division had a brigade of three or four batteries of 8 guns (six cannons and two howitzers) each. Each corps would also have its own artillery reserve, of one of more brigades, armed mostly with the larger, heavier calibre pieces. Battery personnel included not only gun crews, NCOs, and officers, but drummers, trumpeters, metal workers, woodworkers, ouvriers, fouriers, and artificers. They would be responsible for fashioning spare parts, maintaining and repairing the guns, carriages, caissons and wagons, as well as tending the horses and storing munitions.

==== Horse artillery ====
The cavalry were supported by the fast-moving, fast-firing light guns of the horse artillery. This arm was a hybrid of cavalry and artillery with their crews riding either on the horses or on the carriages into battle. Because they operated much closer to the front lines, the officers and crews were better armed and trained for close-quarters combat, mounted or dismounted much as were the dragoons. Once in position, they were trained to quickly dismount, unlimber (deploy), and sight their guns, then fire rapid barrages at the enemy. They could then quickly limber (undeploy) the guns, remount, and move on to a new position. To accomplish this, they had to be the best trained and most elite of all artillerymen. The horse batteries of the Imperial Guard could go from riding at full gallop to firing their first shot in just under a minute.

There were 6 administrative regiments of horse artillery plus one in the Guard. In addition to the batteries assigned to the cavalry units, Napoleon would also assign at least one battery to each infantry corps or, if available, to each division. Their abilities came at a price, however, as horse batteries were very expensive to raise and maintain. Consequently, they were far fewer in number than their foot counterparts, typically constituting only one-fifth of the artillery's strength. Each regiment was equipped with twenty-four 4pdr and 12 howitzers. With the creation of the Guard Foot Artillery in 1808 the regiments of the Horse Artillery were reduced to 2 squadrons with two companies each.

==== Logistics ====
Of all the types of ammunition used in the Napoleonic Wars, the cast iron, spherical, round shot was the staple of the gunner. Even at long range when the shot was travelling relatively slowly it could be deadly, though it might appear to be bouncing or rolling along the ground relatively gently. At short range, carnage could result.In the French Imperial Army, the ammunition columns were grouped into Equipment Trains or Train des Équipages. In 1809, there were more than 11 battalions, with a 12th forming in Commercy, including two reserve battalions being formed in Spain. Each battalion was composed of 6 companies, of which each was commanded by a captain and oversaw some 44 other ranks. A battalion headquarters comprised 4 x officers (a captain in command), 5 x NCOs, and 5 x craftsmen. Each company numbered 1 x officer (sous-lieutenant), 7 x NCOs, 4 x craftsmen, 80 x drivers, 36 x vehicles, and 161 x horses.

==== Artillery train ====
The Artillery Train (Train d'Artillerie), was established by Napoleon in January 1800. Its function was to provide the teamsters and drivers who handled the horses that hauled the artillery's vehicles. Prior to this, the French, like all other period armies, had employed contracted, civilian teamsters who would sometimes abandon the guns under fire, rendering them immobile, rather than risk their lives or their valuable teams of horses. Its personnel, unlike their civilian predecessors, were armed, trained, and uniformed as soldiers. Apart from making them look better on parade, this made them subject to military discipline and capable of fighting back if attacked. The drivers were armed with a carbine, a short sword of the same type used by the infantry, and a pistol. They needed little encouragement to use these weapons, earning surly reputations for gambling, brawling, and various forms of mischief. Their uniforms and coats of grey helped enhance their tough appearance. But their combativeness could prove useful as they often found themselves attacked by Cossacks and Spanish and Tyrolian guerillas.

Each train d'artillerie battalion was originally composed of 5 companies. The first company was considered elite and assigned to a horse artillery battery; the three "centre" companies were assigned to the foot artillery batteries and "parks" (spare caissons, field forges, supply wagons, etc.); and one became a depot company for training recruits and remounts. Following the campaigns of 1800, the train was re-organised into eight battalions of six companies each. As Napoleon enlarged his artillery, additional battalions were created, rising to a total of fourteen in 1810. In 1809, 1812, and 1813 the first thirteen battalions were "doubled" to create 13 additional battalions. These 'double battalions' added the suffix bis after their title, for instance, the doubled 1st became the 1st bis Additionally, after 1809 some battalions raised extra companies to handle the regimental guns attached to the infantry. Following the Restoration, the train was reduced to just four squadrons of 15 x officers and 271 x men, raised to 8 x squadrons in 1815 during the Hundred Days.The Imperial Guard had its own train, which expanded as La Garde's artillery park was increased, albeit organised as regiments rather than battalions. At their zenith, in 1813–14, the Old Guard artillery was supported by a 12-company regiment while the Young Guard had a 16-company regiment, one for each of their component artillery batteries.

=== Support services ===
==== Engineers ====
While the glory of battle went to the cavalry, infantry, and artillery, the army also included military engineers of various types. The bridge builders of the Grande Armée, the pontonniers, were an indispensable part of Napoleon's military machine. Their main contribution was helping the emperor to get his forces across water obstacles by erecting pontoon bridges. The skills of his pontonniers allowed Napoleon to outflank enemy positions by crossing rivers where the enemy least expected and, in the case of the great retreat from Moscow, saved the army from complete annihilation at the Berezina River.

They may not have had the glory, but Napoleon clearly valued his pontonniers. He had 14 companies commissioned into his armies under the command of the engineer, General Jean Baptiste Eblé. Their specialized tools and equipment combined with his training allowed them to swiftly construct different components of the bridges, which could be assembled and reused in the future. All the needed materials, tools, and parts were carried on their wagon trains. If they did not have a part or item, it could be quickly made using the mobile wagon-mounted forges of the pontonniers. A single company of pontonniers could construct a bridge of up to 80 pontoons (a span of some 120 to 150 metres long) in just under seven hours, an impressive feat even by today's standards.

In addition to the pontonniers, there were companies of sappers, to deal with enemy fortifications. They were used far less often in their intended role than the pontonniers. However, since the emperor had learned in his early campaigns (such as the Siege of Acre) that it was better to bypass and isolate fixed fortifications, if possible, than to directly assault them, the sapper companies were usually put to other tasks.

The different types of engineer companies were formed into battalions and regiments called Génie, which was originally a slang term for engineer. This name, which is still used today, was both a play on the word (jeu de mot) and a reference to their seemingly magical abilities to grant wishes and make things appear much like the mythical Genie. Under the empire there were a number of notable changes in the engineer establishment. The six companies of miners were first reduced to five, then increased to nine, and in 1808 a 10th Company was formed and the whole corps divided into two battalions with each comprising file companies. The sapper battalions were increased in number once more until eventually there were eight (five French, one Dutch, one Italian, and one Spanish).

But the losses in the Invasion of Russia led to the number being reduced to five battalions. An Imperial innovation was an engineer train battalion, which was badly needed, and in 1806 each sapper battalion was director to hold a park of tools. A number of pioneer companies were formed to provide unskilled labor for engineer work. Sometime by the time of 1815, the battalions were grouped so that were at least three Engineer Regiments (Régiments du Génie) with at least two battalions each. Battalions of sappers and miners constituted 'magazines' of men from which armies and corps drew companies, and sometimes only detachments, according to their needs. Engineers took a major part in sieges, they were responsible for road works in the field, they advised the infantry in the construction of field fortifications, they laid out the works for protecting gun emplacements, and they were entirely responsible for the fortification of fixed defenses.

==== Medical Service ====
The most significant innovation was the establishment of a system of ambulances volantes (flying ambulances) in the closing years of the 18th century by Dominique Jean Larrey (who would later become surgeon-general of the Imperial Guard). His inspiration was the use of fast horse artillery, or "flying artillery", which could manoeuver rapidly around the battlefield to provide urgent artillery support, or to escape an advancing enemy. The flying ambulance was designed to follow the advance guard and provide initial dressing of wounds (often under fire), while rapidly transporting the critically injured away from the battlefield. The personnel for a given ambulance team included a doctor, quartermaster, non-commissioned officer, a drummer boy (who carried the bandages), and 24 infantrymen as stretcher-bearers.

==== Communications ====
Most dispatches were conveyed as they had been for centuries, via messengers on horseback. Hussars, due to their bravery and riding skills, were often favoured for this task. Shorter-range tactical signals could be sent visually by flags or audibly by drums, bugles, trumpets, and other musical instruments. Thus, standard bearers and musicians, in addition to their symbolic, ceremonial, and morale functions, also played important communication roles.

===== Gendarmerie =====
Under Napoléon, the numbers and responsibilities of the gendarmerie—renamed gendarmerie impériale—were expanded significantly. In contrast to the mounted Maréchaussée, the gendarmerie were both horse and foot personnel; in 1800, these numbered approximately 10,500 of the former and 4,500 of the latter, respectively. In 1804 the first inspector general of Gendarmerie was appointed and a general staff was established based out of the Rue du Faubourg Saint-Honoré in Paris. Subsequently, special gendarmerie units were created within the Imperial Guard for combat duties in French-occupied Spain.

==== National Guard ====
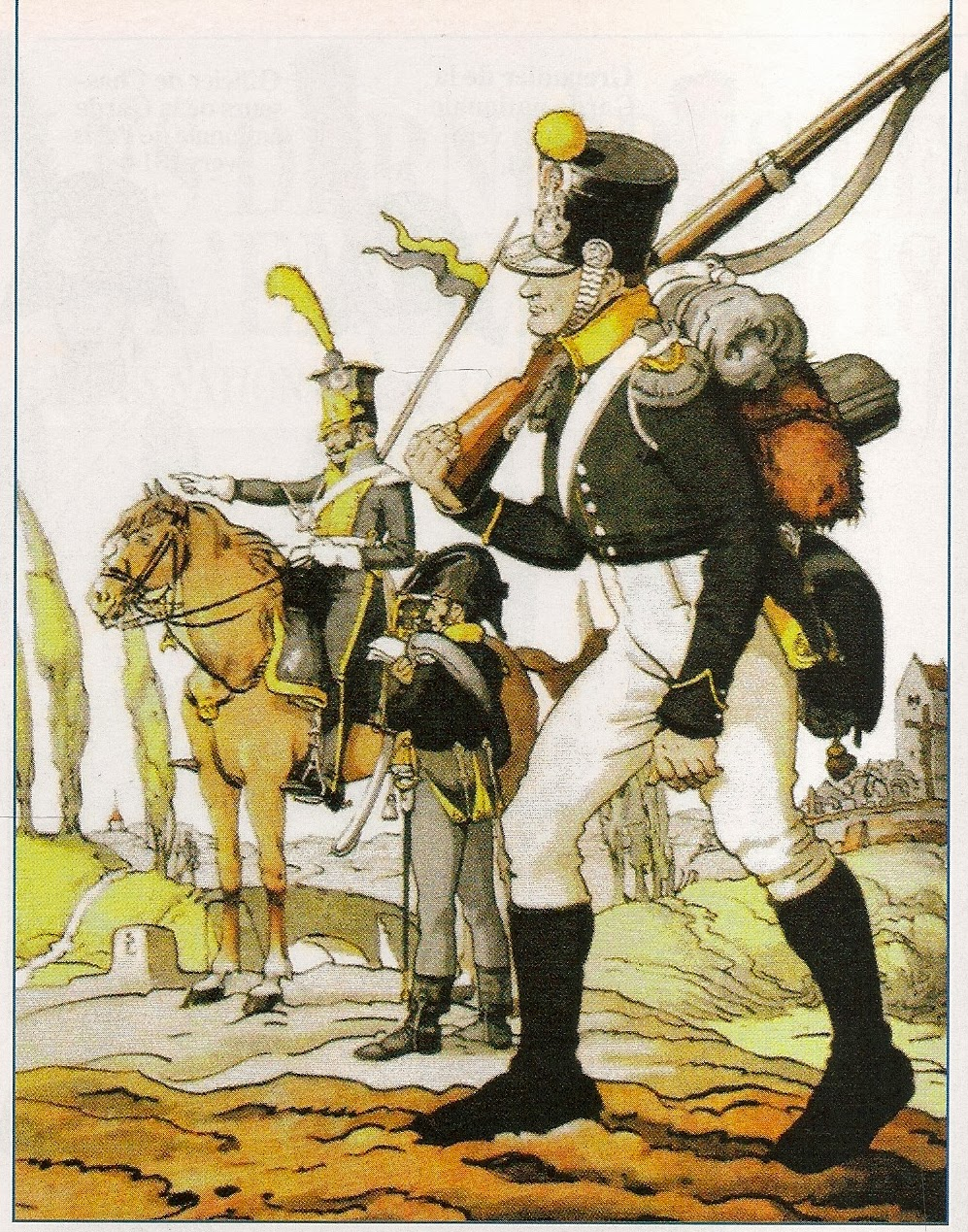
Lancer, fusilier, and officer of the Strasbourg National Guard during the Hundred Days campaign. The unit formed part of the Army of the Rhine, though never saw full combat.

Throughout the Revolutionary Wars and early years of the consulate, the National Guard proved to be very good regional military police, and were able to be mobilised quickly in the event of invasion. Napoleon, therefore, saw the need in providing a constantly available force of National Guardsmen when needed. By the time of the War of the Fourth Coalition and subsequent invasion of Prussia, Napoléon ordered the mobilisation of 3,000 grenadiers and chasseurs of the national guard of Bordeaux to reinforce the coastal defences. Though the expected invasion never came, this small mobilisation proved the National Guard were ready, willing, and able to quickly provide defence where needed. A decree of 12 November 1806 ordered all Frenchmen aged 20 to 60 would be required to perform National Guard service. Under this decree, companies of Grenadiers and Chasseurs could, if possible, be called upon to perform domestic service in towns of more than 5,000 inhabitants alongside the Gendarmerie, or mobilise for military service.

Following the failed Walcheren Campaign, Napoleon's commitment to the National Guard was expanded, and by the end of the year released all regulars into the field while leaving border protection duties and coastal defences solely to the National Guard. On 14 March 1812, a decree called for the recruitment of 88 cohorts (battalion strength), recruited by their respective departments in proportion to the population.

These new cohorts were charged specifically with strengthening the coastal troops and border surveillance corps. These cohorts each had an artillery company attached. Under the 1813 reorganisations, the cohorts were absorbed by the regular army into 22 new line infantry regiments. The 88 companies of artillery were incorporated into the regular artillery at this same time as well. When the Invasion of France began in 1813, a decree was signed to call for 101,640 more men to be raised from the National Guard for the protection of the country. Two divisions were present at the Battle of Fère-Champenoise and at the Battle of Paris.

Most regional national guards consisted of a cavalry unit (usually light cavalry (Chasseurs à Cheval)), 1 or 2 line infantry battalions, and sometimes a regional artillery/coastal artillery company. The National Guard of Paris for example had 12 Legions (companies), and comprised infantry and Tirailleurs.

==== Coastal Artillery ====
Napoleon had inherited 100 x companies of coastal artillery (Cononniers garde-côtes) who manned shore defences, totalling 10,000 men. However, after Napoleon's 1803–1805 reforms, the artillery was completely reorganised into 100 x mobile companies under artillery command and 28 x static companies of National Guard, each company with a nominal establishment of 121 (actual strength varied). By 1812, some 144 x companies existed, but all were disbanded in May 1814 following the restoration.

The coastal artillery's uniform was a black bicorne with a green pompom, a light blue coat with blue cuffs, white turnbacks, sea green collar, lapels, cuff flaps, waistcoat, and breeches, red epaulettes, and yellow buttons. They used infantry equipment, the cartridge box bore a brass badge of an anchor superimposed on a crossed cannon barrel and musket, and the sword knot was red. After the shako was adopted in 1806, it was black with brass chin scales latterly with a red tufted pompom, and a plate bearing crossed cannon, anchor and branches of oak and laurel. From 1812 the plate was like that of the foot artillery please crossed cannons and an anchor.

==== Garrison Artillery ====
The 28 x companies of garrison artillery (Canonniers Sédentaires), raised to 30 x companies by 1812 wore foot artillery uniforms, with a shako plat without a number. Most distinguished was the Garrison Artillery of Lille, a unit formed in 1483, which merged with the National Guard in 1791, and performed with distinction in the Siege of Lille.Their shake plates bore their title. An illustration of a musician of 1815 shows an ordinary uniform but pointed scarlet cuffs, gold trefoil epaulettes, and a cylindrical shako bearing a large brass plate of a trophy of arms atop an 1812-patter shield bearing a grenade over a crossed cannons, with a plume of red over white and blue, over a blue ball. The garrison artillery were not exclusively garrison troops, for example, the Lille Corps (formed into a battalion of two companies in 1803) served in the Walcheren Campaign, where they lost 3 x officers and 24 x other ranks.

==== Veteran Artillery ====
In April 1792, the previous Invalid Companies were replaced by the Veteran Companies, of which 12 x were artillery, raising to 13 x companies of 52 x men in September 1799. In May 1805, the artillery was enlarged to 25 x companies of 100 men each, 19 x companies in 1812, and reduced back to 10 x companies in May 1814. The uniform was that of the foot artillery.

== Pay ==
Flag officer
| Rank | |
|---|---|
| Marshal | 3333 Franc |
| General (corps) | 3000 Franc |
| General (division) | 1250 Franc |
| General (brigade) | 833 Franc |

Senior officer
| Rank | |
|---|---|
| Colonel | 562 Franc |
| Lieutenant colonel | 486 Franc |
| Major | 408 Franc |
| Chef de Battalion | 300 Franc |

Junior officer
| Rank | |
|---|---|
| Captain | 233 Franc |
| 1st lieutenant | 142 Franc |
| 2nd lieutenant | 125 Franc |
| Adjudant Sous-Officier | 83 Franc |

== Formations and tactics ==
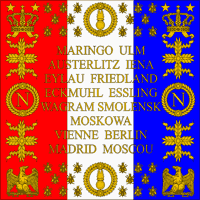
Banner of the 1st Regiment of Grenadier a Pied, showing the regiment's battle honours. Note: all regiments of the guard had the same battle honours.

Napoleon's French Imperial Army developed a sophisticated and flexible system of warfare, centering on two principal strategies: the 'central position' and the 'rear manoeuvre'. When faced with numerically superior enemies, Napoleon aimed to divide their forces by inserting his army between their wings, swiftly overwhelming one segment with concentrated force while using detachments to pin the other, then rapidly shifting to crush the remaining enemy, exploiting speed and coordination to prevent reformation. When he held numerical superiority, he preferred the 'rear manoeuvre', in which a portion of his army would hold the enemy's front while the main body enveloped their rear, severing lines of communication and forcing the enemy to engage on his terms. Both approaches relied on deception, rapid movement, and the precise timing of coordinated attacks, often culminating in a vigorous pursuit by cavalry to maximize enemy losses after the initial defeat. On the battlefield, Napoleon's tactics mirrored his strategic methods: he sought to divide the enemy, envelop flanks, or, if necessary, break through with a massive frontal assault, always striving for flexibility and exploiting weaknesses as they appeared.

From 1804 onwards, French battlefield formations evolved, especially the adoption of large-scale mixed order formations at divisional level, combining the firepower of extended battalion lines with the defensive and offensive flexibility of supporting columns and well-placed divisional artillery. Cavalry was positioned to the rear, ready to counter enemy cavalry threats or to launch swift pursuits once the enemy's line broke. This arrangement enabled the divisions to bring great firepower to bear, defend effectively against cavalry, and, crucially, exploit victories by unleashing cavalry in pursuit—a phase where the greatest enemy losses were inflicted. However, as the wars dragged on and armies grew, the challenges of coordination, difficult terrain, and increasingly wary opponents sometimes blunted these methods, with timing errors and logistical oversights occasionally leading to costly setbacks, as seen in Spain and Russia, and ultimately culminating in the disaster at Waterloo, where Napoleon's own system was used against him.

Some of the more famous, widely used, effective, and interesting formations and tactics included:

- Line (Ligne): The basic three rank line formation, best used for delivering volley fire and was also a decent melee formation for infantry or cavalry, but it was relatively slow moving and vulnerable on the flanks.
- Attack Column (Colonne d'Attaque): A wide column of infantry, almost a hybrid of line and column, with light infantry skirmishers in front to disrupt the enemy and screen the column's advance. Once the column closed, the skirmishers would move off to its flanks, then the column would fire a massed musket salvo and charge with their bayonets. An excellent formation against a standard, thin line. The Attack Column was developed from the "Mob" or "Horde" tactics of the early French Revolutionary Armies. Its disadvantages were a lack of massed firepower and vulnerability to artillery fire.
- Open Order (Ordre Ouvert): Foot and/or horse would spread out by unit and/or individually. This formation was best for light troops and skirmishers. It allowed for rapid movement, especially over broken or rough terrain such as hills or forests, and offered the best protection from enemy fire since the troops were spread out. Its disadvantages were it did not allow for massed or volley fire and was terrible for melee or close-quarters fighting and thus, especially vulnerable to cavalry.
- Square (Carré): Classic infantry formation for defence against cavalry. Soldiers would form a hollow square at least three or four ranks deep on each side, with officers and artillery or cavalry in the middle. It offered infantry their best protection against charges, especially on good defensive terrain such as on the top or reverse slope of a hill. Squares were slow-moving, almost stationary targets, however. This, along with their density, made squares very vulnerable to artillery and to a lesser extent, infantry fire. Once broken, squares tended to completely collapse.

== Ranks of the Imperial Army ==
Unlike the armies of the Ancien Régime and other monarchies, advancement in the Grande Armée was based on proven ability rather than social class or wealth. Napoleon wanted his army to be a meritocracy, where every soldier, no matter how humble of birth, could rise rapidly to the highest levels of command, much as he had done (provided, of course, they did not rise too high or too fast). This was equally applied to the French and foreign officers, and no less than 140 foreigners attained the rank of Général. By and large this goal was achieved. Given the right opportunities to prove themselves, capable men could rise to the top within a few years, whereas in other armies it usually required decades if at all. It was said that even the lowliest private carried a marshal's baton in his knapsack.

Maréchal d'Empire, or marshal of the empire, was not a rank within the Grande Armée, but a personal title granted to distinguished divisional generals, along with higher pay and privileges. The same applied to the corps commanders (General de Corps d'armee) and army commanders (General en chef). The highest permanent rank in the Grande Armée was actually Général de division and those higher than it were positions of the same rank but with separate insignia for appointment holders. The position of colonel general of a branch (such as dragoons or grenadiers of the Guard) was akin to chief inspector-general of that branch, whose office holder used his current officer rank and its corresponding insignia.

=== Ranks ===
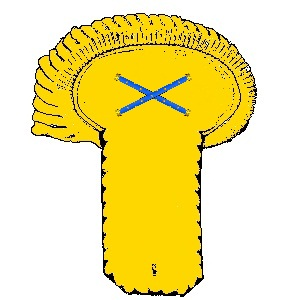
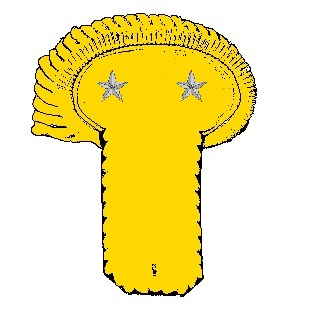
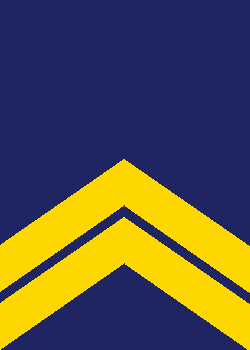
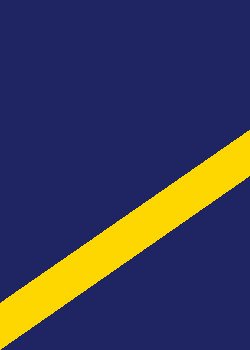
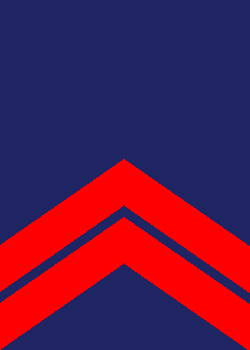
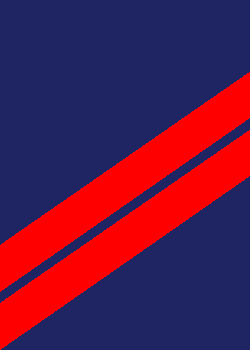
Ranks and rank insignia, Grande Armée
| Description | Flag officer/general staff | | | | | | Senior officer | | | Junior officer | | Senior non-commissioned officers | Junior non-commissioned officers | Senior enlisted | | Junior enlisted |
| Epaulettes/sleeve insignia | | | | | | | | | | | | | | | | NO INSIGNIA | NO INSIGNIA |
| Rank | Maréchal de France | General (Général) | General (Général de division) | Brigadier (Général de brigade) | Colonel | Lieutenant-colonel | Major | Captain (Capitaine) | 1st lieutenant (Lieutenant) | 2nd Lieutenant (Sous Lieutenant) | Warrant Officer (Adjudant Sous-Officier) | Sergeant Major (Sergent-major) | Sergeant (Sergent) | Quartermaster Corporal (Caporal-fourrier) | Corporal (Caporal) | Private/Soldier (Soldat) | Recrut/Conscript (Recruit/Conscrit) |

== See also ==
- French Imperial Eagle
- Legion of Honour
- List of French general officers (Peninsular War)
- Types of military forces in the Napoleonic Wars
- Uniforms of the French Imperial Army
- Weapons of Honour
- Social background of officers and other ranks in the French Army, 1750–1815
- French Imperial Navy

== Bibliography ==
- Bertaud, Jean Paul (1986). "Napoleon´s officers". Past & Present (112). Oxford: Oxford University Press: 91–111. doi:10.1093/past/112.1.91. JSTOR 650999.
- Blond, Philippe (2005). La Grande Armée. Los Angeles, California: Castle Books. ISBN 978-0785818366.
- Brun, Jean-François (May 10, 2014). "Au crépuscule De l'Empire. l'exemple du 151e régiment d'infanterie de ligne". Revue historique des armées (273): 73–82.
- Chandler, David G. (1979). Dictionary of the Napoleonic Wars. London: Arms and Armour Press. ISBN 0853683530.
- Elting, John Robert (1997). Swords around a throne : Napoleon's Grande Armée. New York: Da Capo Press. ISBN 0306807572.
- Grab, Alexander; et al. (Napoleonische Expansionspolitik Okkupation oder Integration) (2013). Conscription and Desertion in France and Italy under Napoleon. Berlin: De Gryuter Brill. ISBN 9783110292725.
- Haythornthwaite, Philip J. (1988a). Napoleon's military machine. London: Guild Publishing. ISBN 0946771669.
- Haythornthwaite, Philip J. (1988b). Napoleon's Specialist Troops. Men-at-Arms Series. Long Acre, London, United Kingdom: Osprey Publishing. ISBN 978-1780969794. OCLC 1021803960.
- McNab, Chris (2009). Armies of the Napoleonic Wars: An Illustrated History. Botley, Oxfordshire: Osprey Publishing. ISBN 978-1846034701. OCLC 755251279.
- Nosworthy, Brent (1996). With musket, cannon and sword: battle tactics of Napoleon and his enemies. New York: Sarpedon. ISBN 1-885119-27-5.
- Pawly, Ronald (2004). Napoleon's Imperial Headquarters Part 1: Organization and Personnel. Botley, Oxfordshire: Osprey Publishing. ISBN 978-1841767932.
- Rogers, Colonel H. C. B. (2005). Napoleon's Army. Barnsley, South Yorkshire: Pen & Sword Books. ISBN 978-1844153107. OCLC 1000572295.
- Smith, Digby (1998). The Greenhill Napoleonic wars data book. London Mechanicsburg, PA: Greenhill Books Stackpole Books. ISBN 978-1-85367-276-7. OCLC 37616149.
- Smith, Digby (2015). An Illustrated Encyclopedia of Uniforms of the Napoleonic Wars. London: Lorenz Books.
- Susane, Louis (1849). Historie de L'Ancienne Infanterie Français: Tome Un. Paris: Librairie Militaire, Maritime et Polytechnique.
- Tulard, Jean (2012). Napoléon, chef de guerre. Paris: Tallandier. ISBN 979-1-02100-029-2.
