= IV Corps (Grande Armée) =

Military unit of Grande Armée

- Active: 1805–1807; 1812–1814; 1815
- Country: First French Empire
- Branch: French Imperial Army
- Size: Corps
- Engagements: War of the Third Coalition; War of the Fourth Coalition; Russian campaign War of the Sixth Coalition; War of the Seventh Coalition

Commanders
- Notable commanders: Eugène de Beauharnais; Henri Gatien Bertrand; Étienne Maurice Gérard; François Joseph Lefebvre; André Masséna; Horace François Sébastiani; Jean-de-Dieu Soult

The IV Corps of the Grande Armée was a French military unit that existed during the Napoleonic Wars. It consisted of several different units and commanders.

== War of the Third Coalition ==
The corps was formed in 1805, with Marshal Jean-de-Dieu Soult being appointed as its commander.

The IV Corps formed part of the extended center of the French line at the Battle of Austerlitz in December 1805. During the battle, Napoleon ordered Soult to attack the Pratzen Heights, from which the Allies had been attacking the French right wing. Repeated attacks from the Russians under General Kutuzov almost broke through the line of IV Corps, but aid from Marshal Jean-Baptiste Bernadotte's I Corps allowed the French to maintain their control of the Heights. The survivors then moved south and enveloped General Friedrich Wilhelm von Buxhoeveden's column, sending the Allies into a retreat.

== War of the Fourth Coalition ==
The corps formed the right wing of the French line at the Battle of Jena in October 1806. At Eylau in February 1807, the corps was beaten back by the Russian Army under Generals Tutchkov and Dmitry Dokhturov.

In 1808, Soult was transferred to Spain, where he took command of the II Corps in the Peninsular War.

== Russian campaign ==
The corps consisted mainly of troops from the Kingdom of Italy by the time of the invasion of Russia in 1812. It was commanded by Napoleon's stepson Eugène de Beauharnais. The corps participated in the Battle of Borodino, where it formed the left wing of the French line. Commanders at Borodino:

- Corps commander: Prince Eugène de Beauharnais;
  - Divisional commanders:
    - General de division Delzons
    - General de division Broussier
    - General de brigade Lechi
  - Corps cavalry under General de division d'Ornano
  - Corps artillery under General de division d'Anthouard de Vraincourt

Later, it also fought at the battles of Malojaroslavec and Viazma. The corps suffered heavy casualties during the retreat. In the Battle of Krasnoi it was cut off from Napoleon and the Viceroy of Italy refused to surrender. The remnants made a detour.

== War of the Sixth Coalition ==
Under the command of General Henri Gatien Bertrand, it took part in the battles of Lützen, Großbeeren, Dennewitz, Wartenburg and Leipzig.

== War of the Seventh Coalition ==
The corps was headed by General Étienne Maurice Gérard in 1815 and took part in the Battle of Ligny and the Battle of Waterloo.
