= Battle of Reichenbach =

Battle during the War of the Sixth Coalition

- Part of the German campaign of the Sixth Coalition
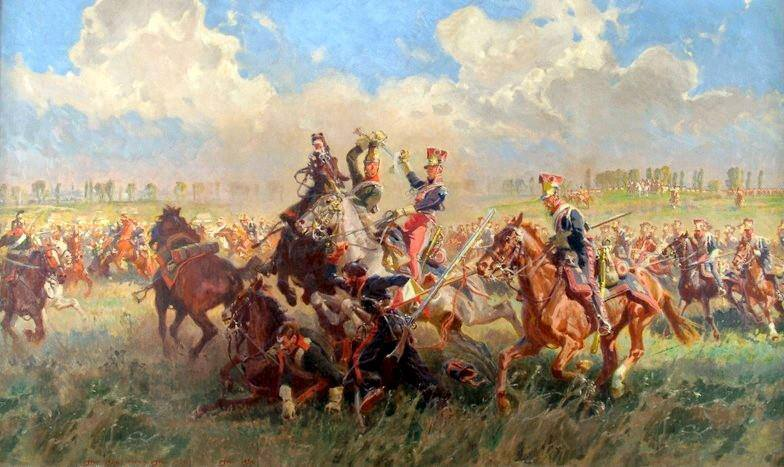
- General Dezydery Chłapowski at the Battle of Reichenbach on 22 May 1813 by Zygmunt Rozwadowski, 1929
Date	22 May 1813
Location	Reichenbach, Kingdom of Saxony
Result	French victory

Belligerents
France	Russia; Prussia

Commanders and leaders
(First French Empire) Napoleon Bonaparte (First French Empire) Géraud Duroc † (First French Empire) Jean Reynier	(Russian Empire) Aleksey Yermolov (Russian Empire) Eugen of Württemberg

Units involved
VII Corps; I Cavalry Corps; V Corps	2nd Infantry Corps; • 3rd Division; • 4th Division

Strength
50,000 (in total)	Unknown

Casualties and losses
"Quite large"	181 only captured; total casualties unknown

The Battle of Reichenbach/Würtzen (German: Schlacht bei Reichenbach und Markersdorf, lit. 'Battle of Reichenbach and Markersdorf') took place on 22 May during the German campaign of 1813 as part of the War of the Sixth Coalition.

Coalition forces were pursued after Bautzen and overtaken near Reichenbach. The ensuing battle resulted in a French victory, after Russian and some Prussian forces retreated from Reichenbach to Markersdorf. The shooting and cannonade did not cease until nightfall, and then the next morning the allies left their positions. The French forces were led by Napoleon; on the Russo-Prussian side, the forces were initially commanded by General Yermolov, until in stubborn combats he was driven back from three positions before reaching Reichenbach and thereafter replaced by Eugen of Württemberg.

Notably, one of Napoleon's closest friends, Grand Marshal Duroc, died in this battle in Würtzen. Duroc suffered for 14 hours and prayed for death every minute. Napoleon tried to console him with the hope of meeting in the future life; Duroc reminded him of his daughter and asked him to leave. Returning to the headquarters, Napoleon walked back and forth for a long time in troubled thought, no one broke his silence, until General Antoine Drouot ordered to ask him where to place the guard batteries. Napoleon simply replied: A demain tout, 'until tomorrow — that's all'.

As the Russian historian Bogdanovich wrote about the Lützen–Reichenbach campaign, "the victory in the second pitched battle (Bautzen) and the fourteen-hour pursuit did not achieve any decisive result for Napoleon. Neither the significant superiority in the number of troops, nor the genius and persistence of the great military commander (Napoleon), nor his selflessness in the heat of combat, could compensate for the lack of cavalry."

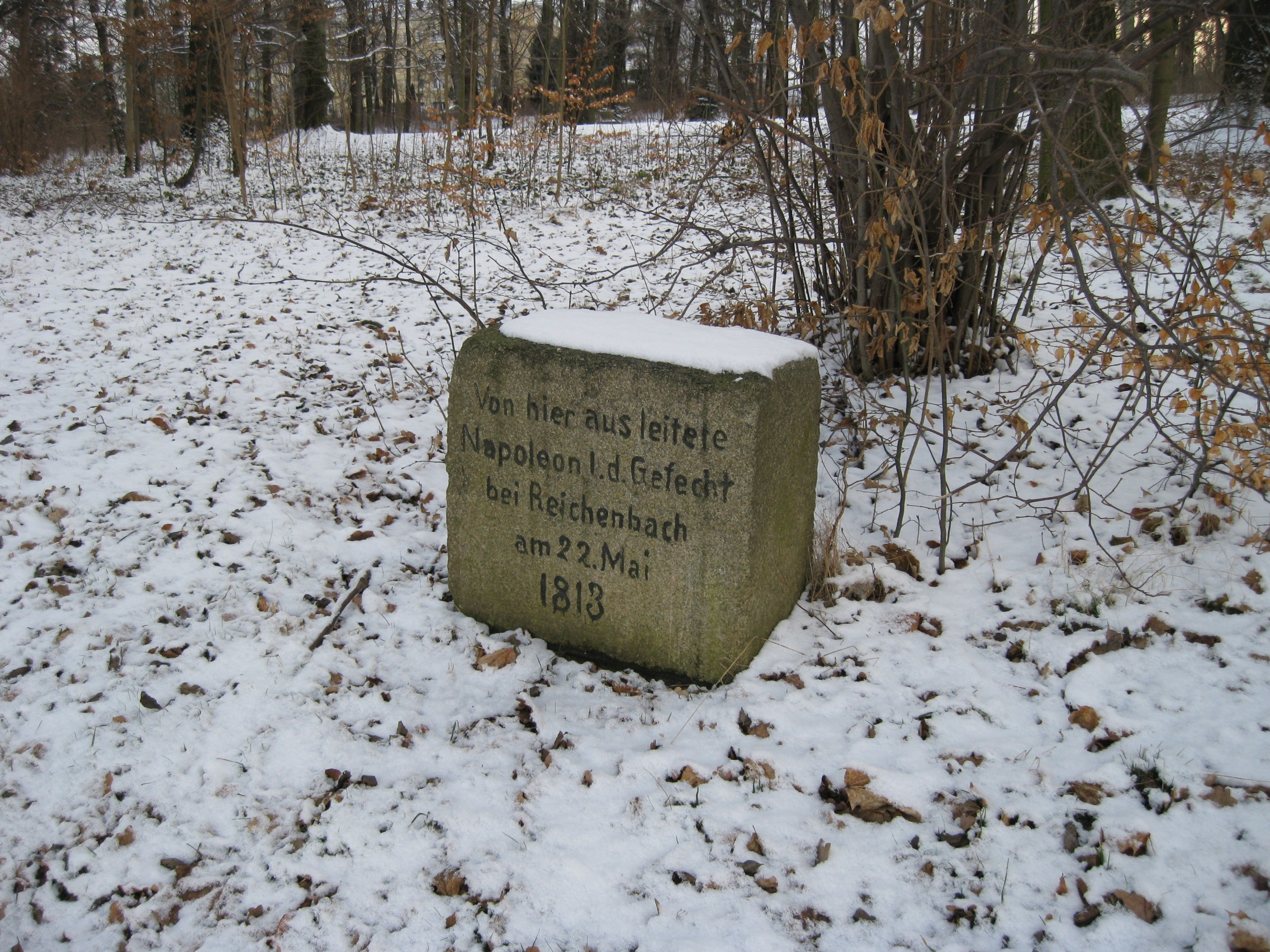
Memorial stone in Niederhofpark, Reichenbach. Marking the spot of Napoleon's headquarters during the battle.
