= Géraud Duroc =

French general, Grand marshal of the palace

Géraud Duroc Duke of Frioul
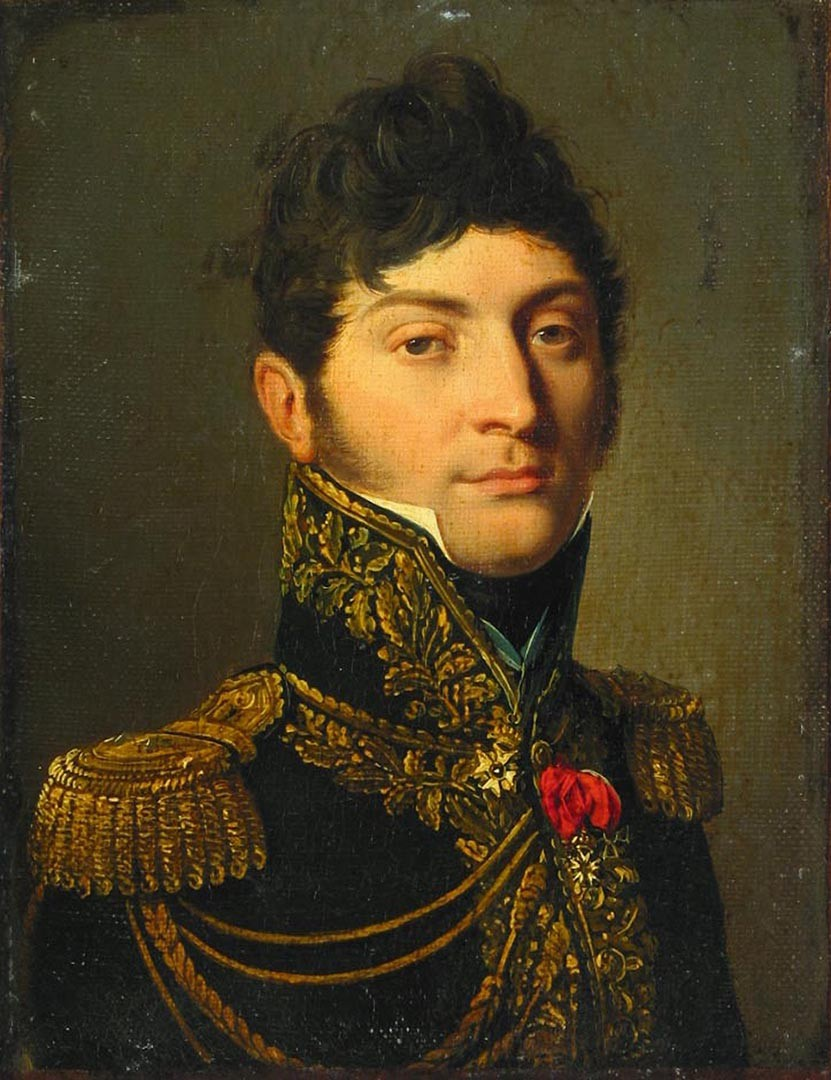
- Portrait by Louis-Léopold Boilly between 1806 and 1809
- Born: 25 October 1772; Pont-à-Mousson, Lorraine and Barrois, Kingdom of France
- Died: 23 May 1813 (aged 40) Markersdorf, Kingdom of Saxony, Rhine Confederation
- Buried: Les Invalides
- Allegiance: (Kingdom of France) Army of Condé; French First Republic; First French Empire
- Branch: Army
- Service years: 1792–1813
- Rank: Général de Division
- Conflicts: See battles: French Revolutionary Wars; War of the First Coalition; Siege of Toulon; War of the Second Coalition; Battle of Abukir; Battle of Marengo; Napoleonic Wars; War of the Third Coalition; Battle of Austerlitz; War of the Fifth Coalition; Battle of Aspern-Essling; Battle of Wagram; French Invasion of Russia; Battle of Borodino; War of the Sixth Coalition; Battle of Lützen; Battle of Bautzen; Battle of Reichenbach †
- Awards: Grand Eagle of the Legion of Honor; Grand Cross of the House Order of Fidelity; Grand Cross of the Order of the Black Eagle; Order of the Golden Eagle of Württemberg (4 September 1807) Duke of the Empire
- Other work: Grand marshal of the palace Member of the Sénat conservateur

Géraud Christophe Michel Duroc (French pronunciation: [ʒeʁo kʁistɔf miʃɛl dyʁɔk]; born du Roc; 25 October 1772 – 23 May 1813), Duke of Frioul, was a French general and diplomat who fought in the French Revolutionary Wars and the Napoleonic Wars. He was noted for his friendship with Napoleon Bonaparte, who appointed him as the first Grand marshal of the palace, the head of the Emperor's military household. He is sometimes referred to as ‘Napoleon's shadow’ (l'ombre de Napoléon in French).

== Early life and education ==
Duroc was born in Pont-à-Mousson on 25 October 1772, to a family of the noblesse de robe from Gévaudan. His father, Claude du Roc, was a former captain of the dragoons who had retired to Pont-à-Mousson due to hearing loss. Duroc entered the local military school in 1781, where he studied for eight years. He then entered the School of Artillery of Châlons as a second lieutenant, in March 1792. Around this time, he removed the nobiliary particle de from his surname (changing it to Duroc), in the context of the French Revolution.

As a member of the nobility, Duroc opposed the new revolutionary government of France. In July 1792, he left the artillery school to become an emigré soldier in the counter-revolutionary Army of Condé, at the start of the Revolutionary Wars. He soon changed his mind, however, and after the Battle of Valmy Duroc deserted the royalist army. Along with two other deserters, he was arrested by the French in Fresnes-en-Woëvre following the battle, and in March 1793 he was allowed to return to Châlons and finish his education.

== Revolutionary Wars ==
Duroc joined the French Revolutionary Army on 1 June 1793, being assigned lieutenant en seconde of the 4th Foot Artillery Regiment, and advanced steadily in the service. Captain Duroc became aide-de-camp to Napoleon in 1796, and distinguished himself at Isonzo, Brenta and Gradisca in the Italian campaigns of 1796-1797.

He served in Egypt, and was seriously wounded at the Battle of Abukir. His devotion to Napoleon was rewarded by complete confidence. He became first aide-de-camp (1798), general of brigade (1800) then governor of the Tuileries Palace. After the Battle of Marengo, Duroc was sent on missions to Vienna, St Petersburg, Stockholm and Copenhagen.

== Napoleonic Wars ==
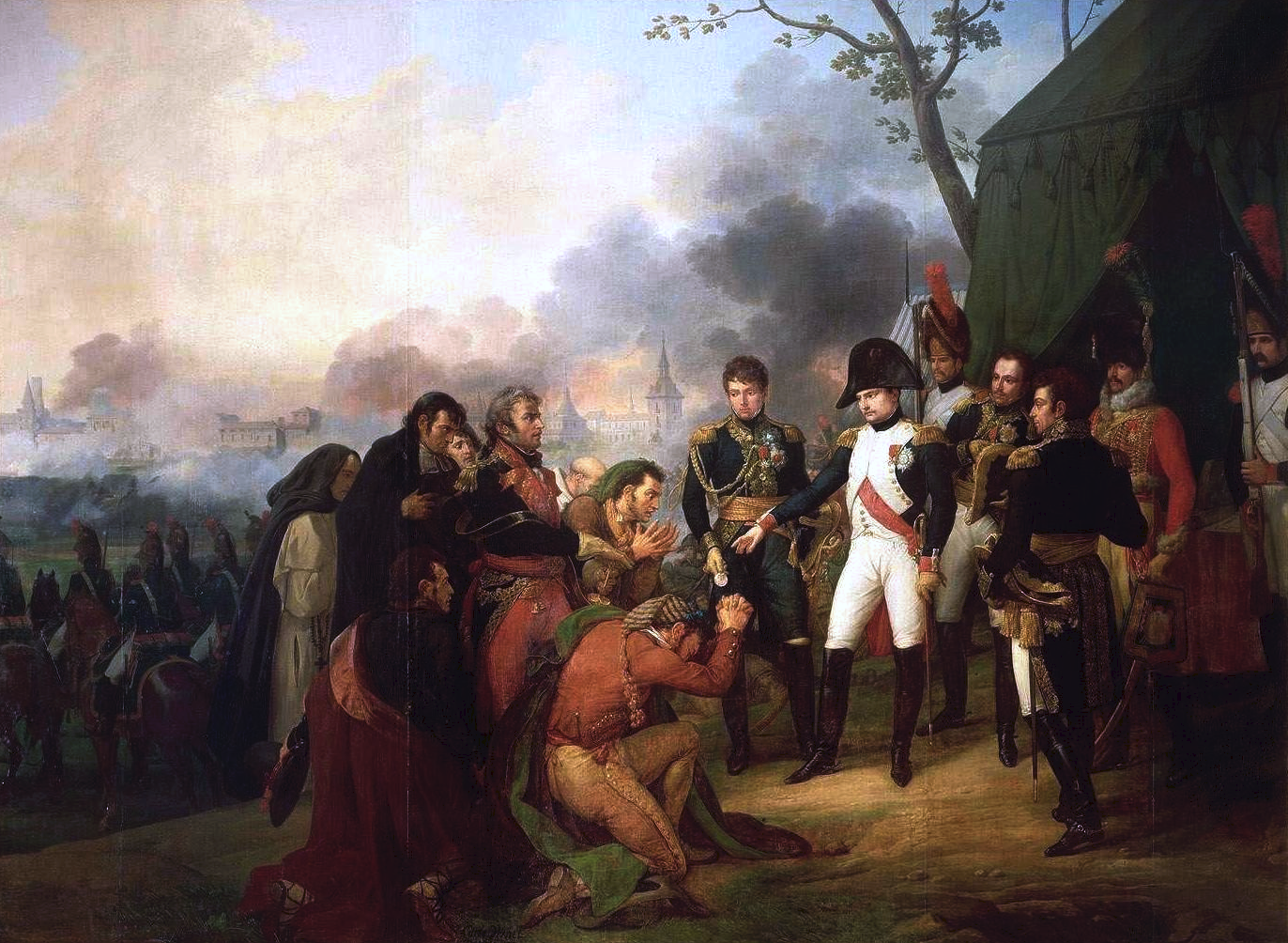
Napoleon before Madrid, 3 December 1808, by Carle Vernet (1810). To the emperor's right, Duroc indicates to the Spanish authorities the time at which Madrid must surrender, after the Battle of Somosierra

As Grand Marshal of the Palace, Duroc was responsible for the measures taken to secure Napoleon's personal safety, whether in France or on his campaigns, and he directed the minutest details of the imperial household.

After the Battle of Austerlitz, where he commanded the grenadiers in the absence of General Oudinot, he was employed in a series of important negotiations with Frederick William III of Prussia, with the elector of Saxony (December 1806), in the incorporation of certain states in the Confederation of the Rhine, and in the conclusion of the armistice of Znaim (July 1809).

In 1808, he was created Duke of Frioul (Duc de Frioul): his duchy was made duché grand-fief for his widow in 1813, a rare - but nominal - hereditary honour (extinguished in 1829), created in Napoleon's own Kingdom of Italy. In 1813, after the Russian campaign he was appointed to the Sénat conservateur as a senator.

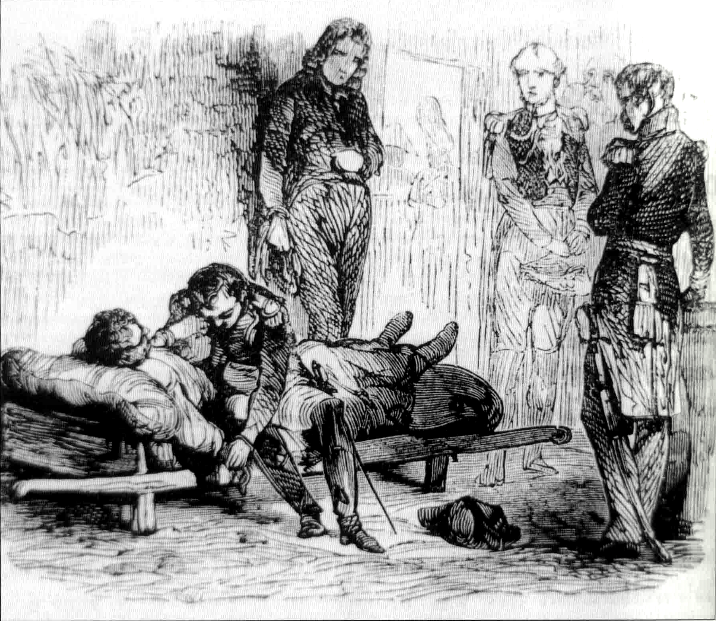
Napoleon weeps for Duroc, wounded. Engraving by Horace Vernet.

After the Battle of Bautzen (20–21 May 1813), the Grande Armée made a slow pursuit of Allied forces. At the Battle of Reichenbach on 22 May 1813, a cannonball ricocheted off a tree-trunk, hit Duroc in the stomach, tore open his belly and spilled out his intestines in a gory mess over uniform, saddle and horse, which Napoleon witnessed. Whilst Duroc lay dying inside a farmhouse, he requested Napoleon's presence where he apologised to the Emperor for not being able to serve him further, asked him to be a father to his daughter, and then requested him to withdraw so that he was not present at the moment of death. Alternatively, Napoleon claimed in later life that "when his bowels were falling out before my eyes, he repeatedly cried to me to have him put out of his misery. I told him: 'I feel pity for you, my friend, but there is no remedy but to suffer till the end.'" Napoleon bought the farm and erected a monument to his memory.

== Legacy ==
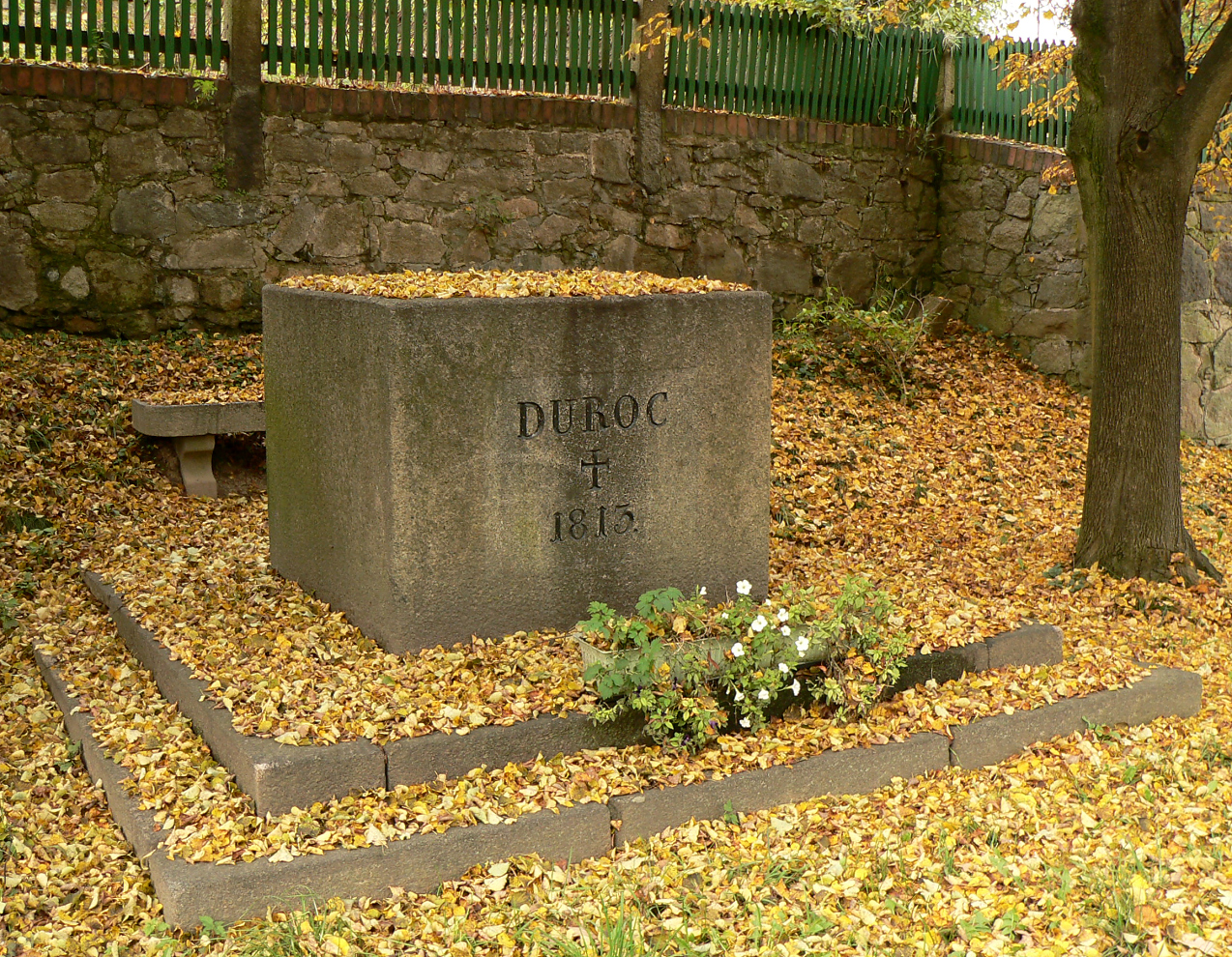
Monument to General Duroc near the place of his death in battle, in Markersdorf, Germany

Duroc's remains were moved in 1847 to be buried in the Hôtel des Invalides, in Paris. His name is inscribed on the Eastern pillar of the Arc de Triomphe, on column 15.

The metro station Duroc of the Paris Métro is named after him.
