= Henri-Gatien Bertrand =

French general (1773–1844)

Count of the Empire Henri-Gatien, comte Bertrand
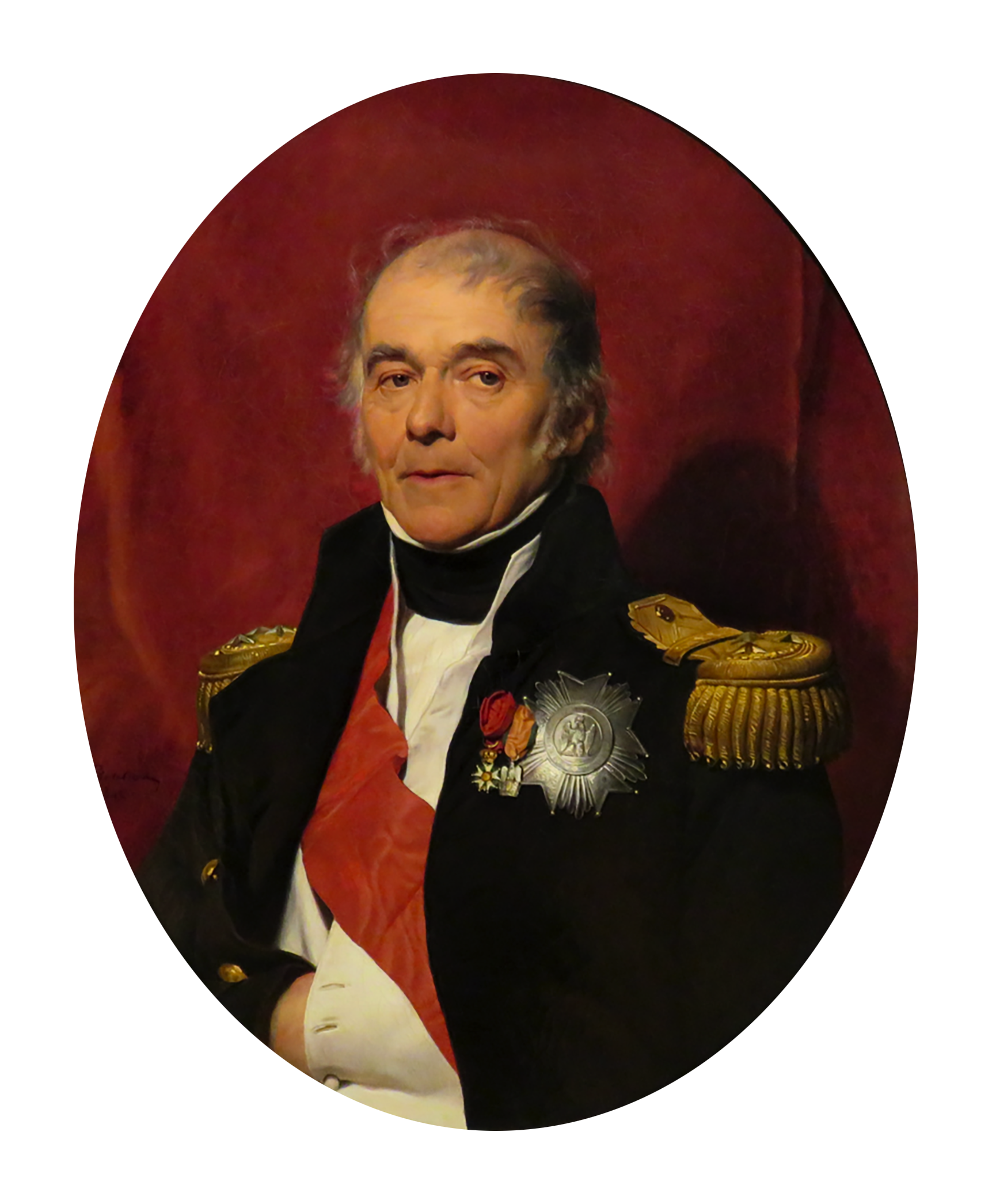
- Portrait by Delaroche, c. 1844
- Born: 22 March 1773; Châteauroux, Kingdom of France
- Died: 31 January 1844 (aged 70) Châteauroux, France
- Allegiance: First French Republic; First French Empire
- Service years: 1793–1815
- Rank: Général de Division
- Commands: IV Corps; Grand Marshal of the Palace
- Conflicts: French Revolutionary Wars; War of the Second Coalition; French invasion of Egypt and Syria; Battle of the Pyramids; Napoleonic Wars; War of the Third Coalition; Battle of Austerlitz; War of the Fourth Coalition; Battle of Jena–Auerstedt; Battle of Eylau; War of the Fifth Coalition; Battle of Wagram; Battle of Aspern-Essling; War of the Sixth Coalition; German campaign; Battle of Bautzen; Battle of Wartenburg; War of the Seventh Coalition; War of the Seventh Coalition; Battle of Waterloo
- Awards: Name engraved on the Arc de Triomphe; Grand Eagle of the Legion of Honour; Count of the Empire
- Other work: Deputy of Indre; Commander of the École Polytechnique

Henri-Gatien Bertrand (French pronunciation: [ɑ̃ʁi ɡasjɛ̃ bɛʁtʁɑ̃]; 22 March 1773 – 31 January 1844) was a French general who served during the French Revolutionary Wars and the Napoleonic Wars. Under the Empire he was the third and last Grand marshal of the palace, the head of the Military Household of emperor Napoleon, whom he followed in both the exiles to Elba and Saint Helena.

== Early life and education ==
Bertrand was born at Châteauroux, in the province of Berry, to a well-to-do bourgeois family.

== Military career ==
At the outbreak of the French Revolution, he had just finished his studies at the Prytanée National Militaire, and he entered the army as a volunteer. During the expedition to Egypt, Bonaparte named him colonel (1798), then brigadier-general, and after the Battle of Austerlitz his aide-de-camp. His life was henceforth closely bound up with that of Napoleon, who had the fullest confidence in him, honoring him in 1808 with the title of count and at the end of 1813, with the title of Grand Marshal of the Palace.

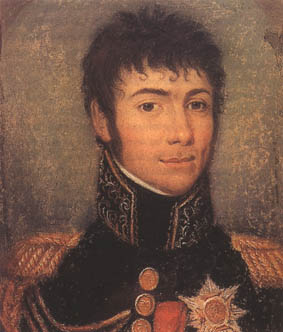
Henri Gatien Bertrand, general of the First French Empire.

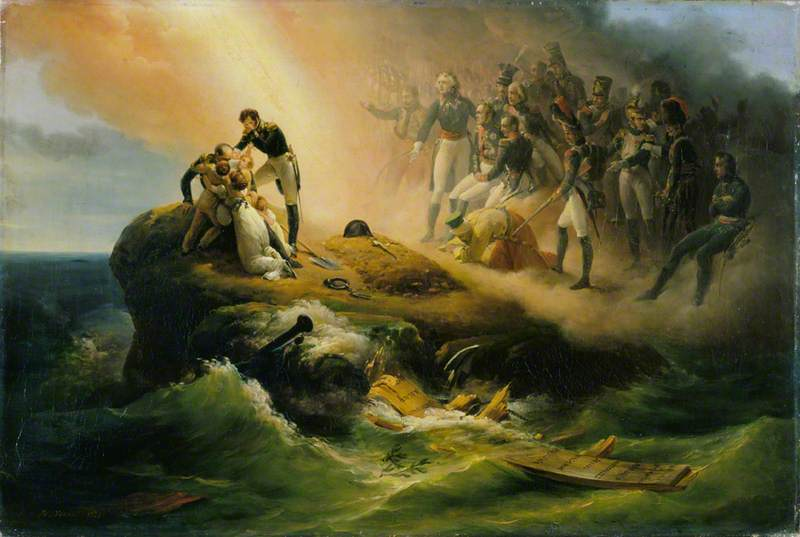
Napoleon's Tomb by Horace Vernet, 1821. Bertrand and his family are on the left

It was Bertrand who in 1809 directed the building of the bridges by which the French army crossed the Danube at Wagram. In 1811, the Emperor appointed Bertrand governor of the Illyrian Provinces and during the German campaign of 1813, he commanded IV Corps which he led in the battles of Großbeeren, Dennewitz, Wartenburg and Leipzig.

In 1813, after the Battle of Leipzig, it was due to his initiative that the French army was not totally destroyed. He accompanied the Emperor to Elba in 1814, returned with him in 1815, held a command in the Waterloo campaign, and then, after the defeat, accompanied Napoleon to Saint Helena. Condemned to death in 1816, he did not return to France until after Napoleon's death, and then Louis XVIII granted him amnesty allowing him to retain his rank. Bertrand was elected deputy in 1830 but defeated in 1834. In 1840 he was chosen to accompany the Prince of Joinville to St. Helena to retrieve and bring Napoleon's remains to France, in what became known as the retour des cendres.

During his exile on St Helena he compiled Napoléon's confidences in a book entitled "Les cahiers de Sainte Hélène". The manuscript was codified and later decodified and commented by Paul Fleuriot de Langle. According to historians, this document is more accurate than Las Cases' "Memorial de Sainte Hélène" which reached a much larger amount of readers in the 19 century as it was designed for propangada purposes.

Bertrand's fourth child, Arthur, born on St. Helena, quickly became a favorite of Napoleon's. Arthur is otherwise best known for his affair with French actress Mademoiselle Rachel, with which he had a son.

== Personal life ==
In 1808 Bertrand married Fanny (1785–1836), the daughter of general Arthur Dillon and through her mother a cousin of the Empress Joséphine. They had six children, with one being born on Elba and another on Saint Helena.

== Death and burial ==
He died at Châteauroux on 31 January 1844 and was buried in Les Invalides.

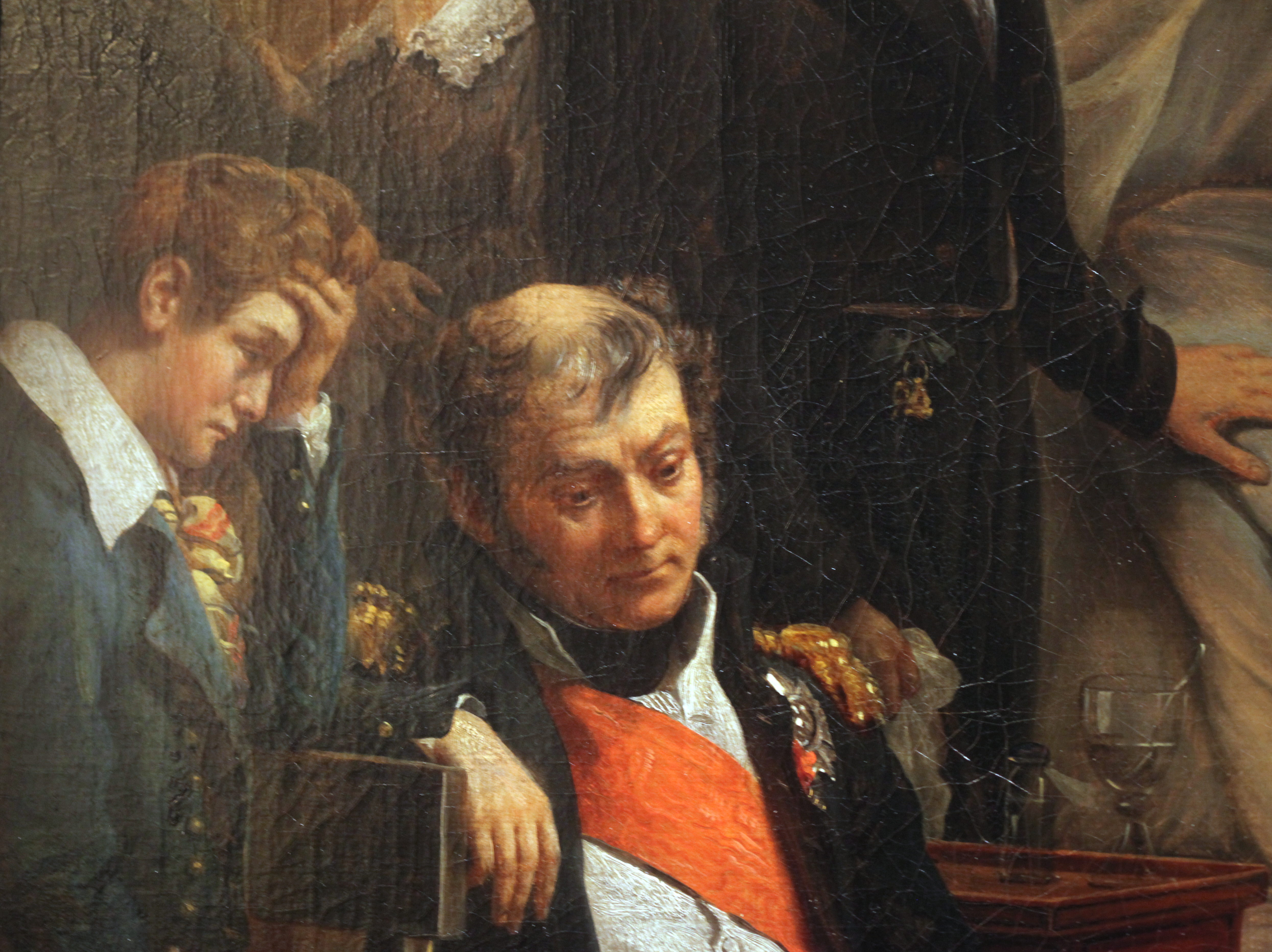
Detail of Charles de Steuben's portrait of Napoleon's death, showing Bertrand and his son Napoleon.

== In popular culture ==
Alexandre Dumas mentions Bertrand in the earlier pages of his well-known novel The Count of Monte Cristo. He is also mentioned in Book II Chapter 1 of Les Misérables by Victor Hugo.
