= Grand marshal of the palace =

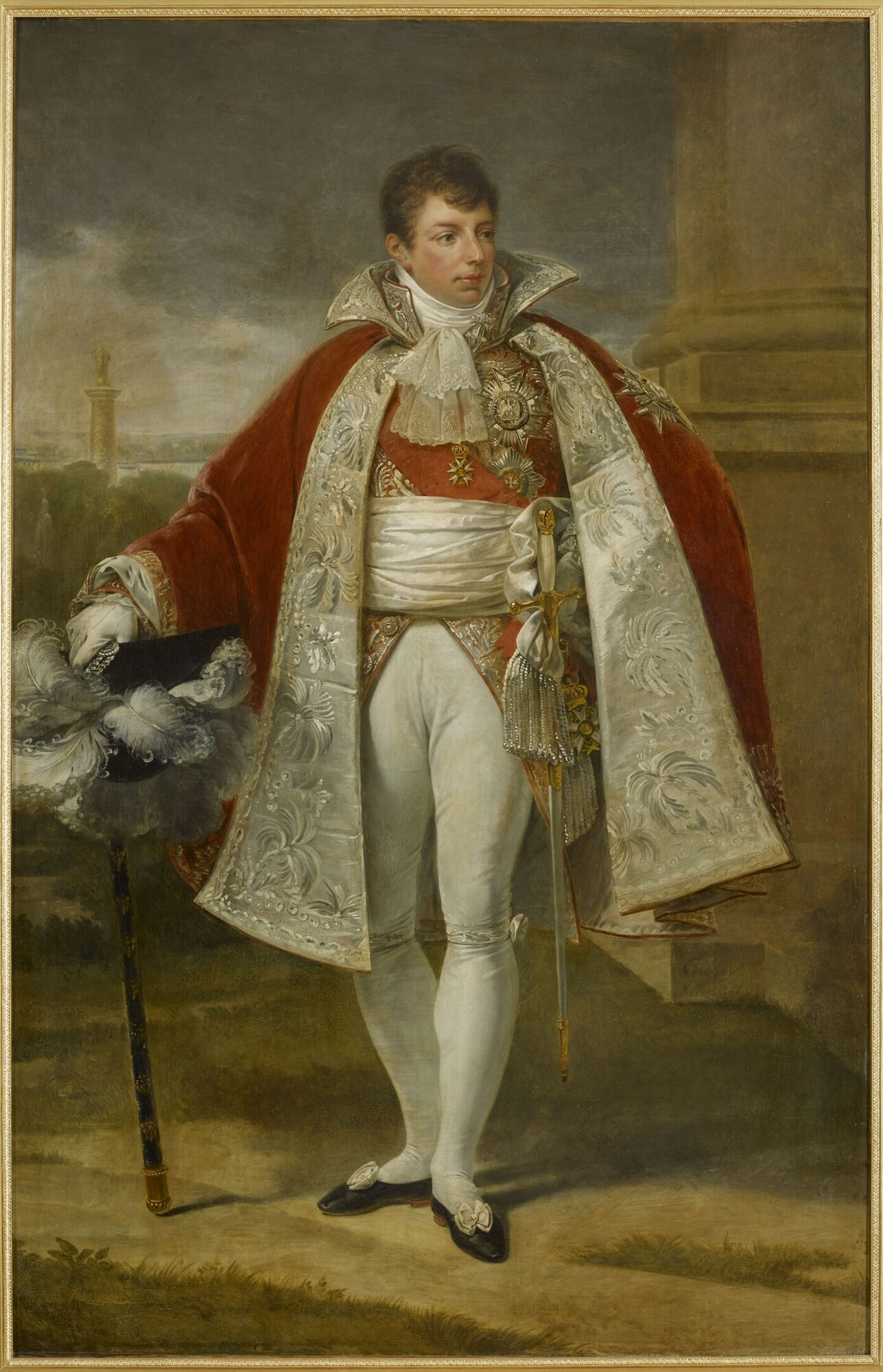
Géraud Duroc in ceremonial attire of Grand marshal of the palace

Grand marshal of the palace (French: Grand maréchal du palais) was the title used by the leader of the Military Household of the Emperor, during the First French Empire. The responsibilities of this position included: keeping accounts of the expenses (food, scouting, security, servants, etc.), policing and ensuring the security of the household, during wartime as well as during peacetime.

General Géraud Duroc held the position from the moment when Napoleon I became Emperor of the French (18 May 1804) until his death in battle on 23 May 1813. Then, from 25 May, General Armand de Caulaincourt replaced Duroc but the position was again vacant later that year, when Caulaincourt became foreign minister (20 November). From that date, General Bertrand became grand marshal, exercising his duties during the last days of the empire, as well as in exile on the islands of Elba and Saint Helena, up until the death of the emperor on 5 May 1821.
