= Military Household of the Emperor =

Coat of arms of the French Imperial House during the First Empire

The Military Household of the Emperor (French: Maison Militaire de l'Empereur) was the immediate entourage of the Emperor of the French during the First French Empire.

== Membership numbers ==
By the end of December 1806, no less than 800 men were members of the Military Household (200 for the saddle crew, 200 for the light crew, and 400 for the harness crew).

== Structure ==
Its key components were organised around three main functions:

- Military and administrative functions:
  - Grand Marshal of the Palace, held by Generals Géraud Duroc, Armand-Augustin-Louis de Caulaincourt, and Henri Gatien Bertrand;
  - Grand Squire of France, exclusively held by Caulaincourt;
  - Chief of Staff of the Army (major général), most notably held by Marshal Louis-Alexandre Berthier;
  - Governor of the pages;
  - Squire of the Empress
- Military functions:
  - Generals without assignment who were available for temporary assignments;
  - Seven aides-de-camp of the Emperor, who had their own aides-de-camp;
  - Twelve batmen of the Emperor, usually officers;
  - the Emperor's Cabinet;
  - Private Secretariat;
  - Espionage service;
  - Archives service;
  - One translator-secretary;
  - Topographical bureau;
- Civil functions:
  - The Emperor's personal service:
    - Four menservants of the Emperor;
    - Administrator of the gardens;
    - Mameluke of the Emperor (Roustam Raza);
  - Other services:
    - Marshal of the palace;
    - Prefect of the palace;
    - Chamberlains;
    - Squires;
    - Surgeons;
    - One doctor;
    - The crown's payer;
    - Low-ranking personnel (menservants, cooks, grooms etc.)
