= Zygmunt Rozwadowski =

Polish painter (1870–1950)

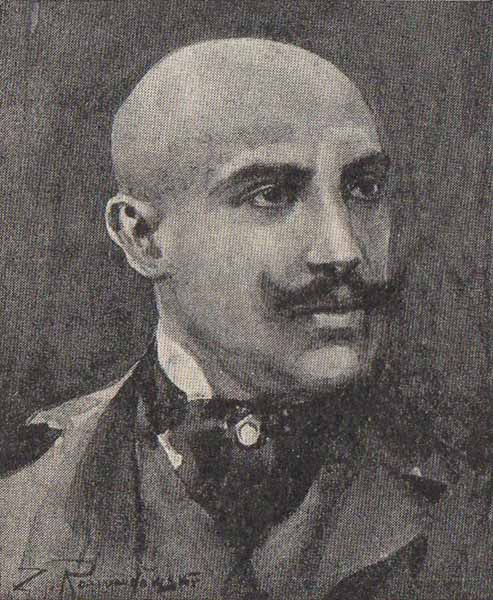
- Rozwadowski in the 1910s
- Born: 25 January 1870; Lemberg, Austria-Hungary
- Died: 23 July 1950 (aged 80); Zakopane, Poland
- Occupation: Painter

Zygmunt Rozwadowski (25 January 1870 – 23 July 1950) was a Polish painter. His work was part of the painting event in the art competition at the 1928 Summer Olympics.
