= Social background of officers and other ranks in the French Army, 1750–1815 =

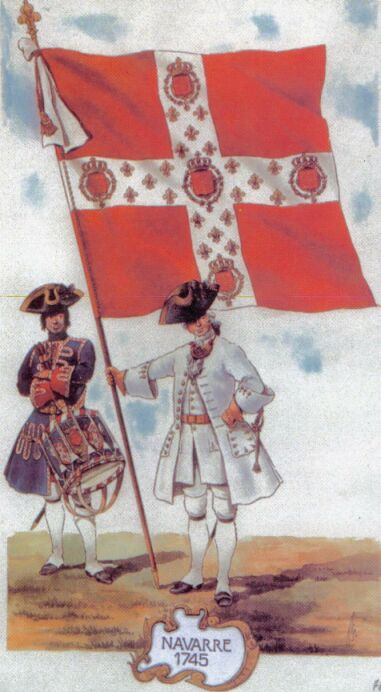
Officer and drummer with the regimental colors of the Régiment de Navarre 1745.

Social background of officers and other ranks in the French Army, 1750–1815 discusses career paths and social stratification in the French Army from the mid-eighteenth century to the end of the Napoleonic Wars.

The Royal Army during the Ancien regime was recruited through volunteer enlistment. Almost 90% of the recruits came from the peasantry and the working class, while about 10% came from the petty bourgeoisie. Privates were usually promoted directly to the rank of sergeant and bypassed the rank of corporal. At the time of the French Revolution, a third of the sergeants came from the petty bourgeoisie or higher classes. Three career paths existed for officers; one privileged for the high nobility, one standard for the middle and lower nobility and the higher bourgeoisie and one exceptional for promoted sergeants.

The high nobility quickly reached high rank, the mean age of promotion to colonel being 36 years. The standard career path was based on seniority and was rather inert; the mean age of promotion to captain was 45 years. Promoted sergeants could normally not reach higher than to substantive lieutenants and captains by brevet although their social background significantly deviated from the rank and file; over two thirds came from the petty bourgeoisie or higher classes. The different career paths created a lack of social homogeneity in the officer corps.

The military reforms after the Seven Years' War attempted to create a professionalized officer corps built on the petty nobility. However, the privileged career of the high nobility being retained caused the failure of the reforms. In consequence, many noblemen in the officer corps sided with the bourgeoisie in the struggle against the class prerogatives of the high nobility.

The French Revolution changed everything. Conscription replaced volunteer enlistment. Regulations favouring sergeants and the flight of the nobility created an officer corps who under Napoleon contained a large majority of former sergeants. The Grande Armée was an army officered by the bourgeoisie, and over half of the officers came from the higher bourgeoisie, a third from the petty bourgeoisie and a sixth from the peasantry. More officers were from the old nobility than from the working class. Three fourths were former sergeants, the other fourth being appointed directly from civilian life.

== Rank and file ==
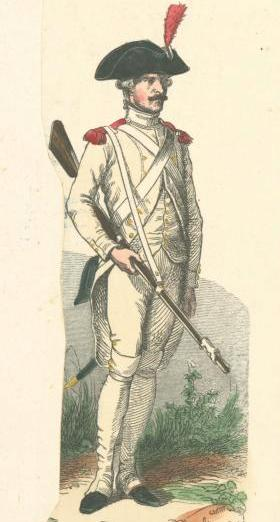
The common soldiers came from the common people.

The early modern standing French Army recruited the other ranks through volunteer enlistment. Domestic recruitment difficulties were solved through enlistment of Germans, Swiss, Irish, and others abroad. During the 18th century about 15% of the other ranks in the French army belonged to foreign regiments in French service. Wartime casualties were largely replaced through drafts from the militia. New recruits during war therefore consisted of from 20% up to 50% drafted men, not volunteer enlistees. Under Louis XIII, the nobility was encouraged to serve as private soldiers. The growth of the French Army under Louis XIV meant that most noblemen served as officers. During the 18th century, the nobility was officially prohibited from serving in the ranks. Almost 90% of the rank and file came during the 18th century from the peasantry and the working class, while about 10% came from the petty bourgeoisie. Members of the higher bourgeoisie and of the nobility were also found among the other ranks, although their proportion gradually diminished during the century. About a third of the soldiery was born in towns, the rest in the countryside.

== Non-commissioned officers ==
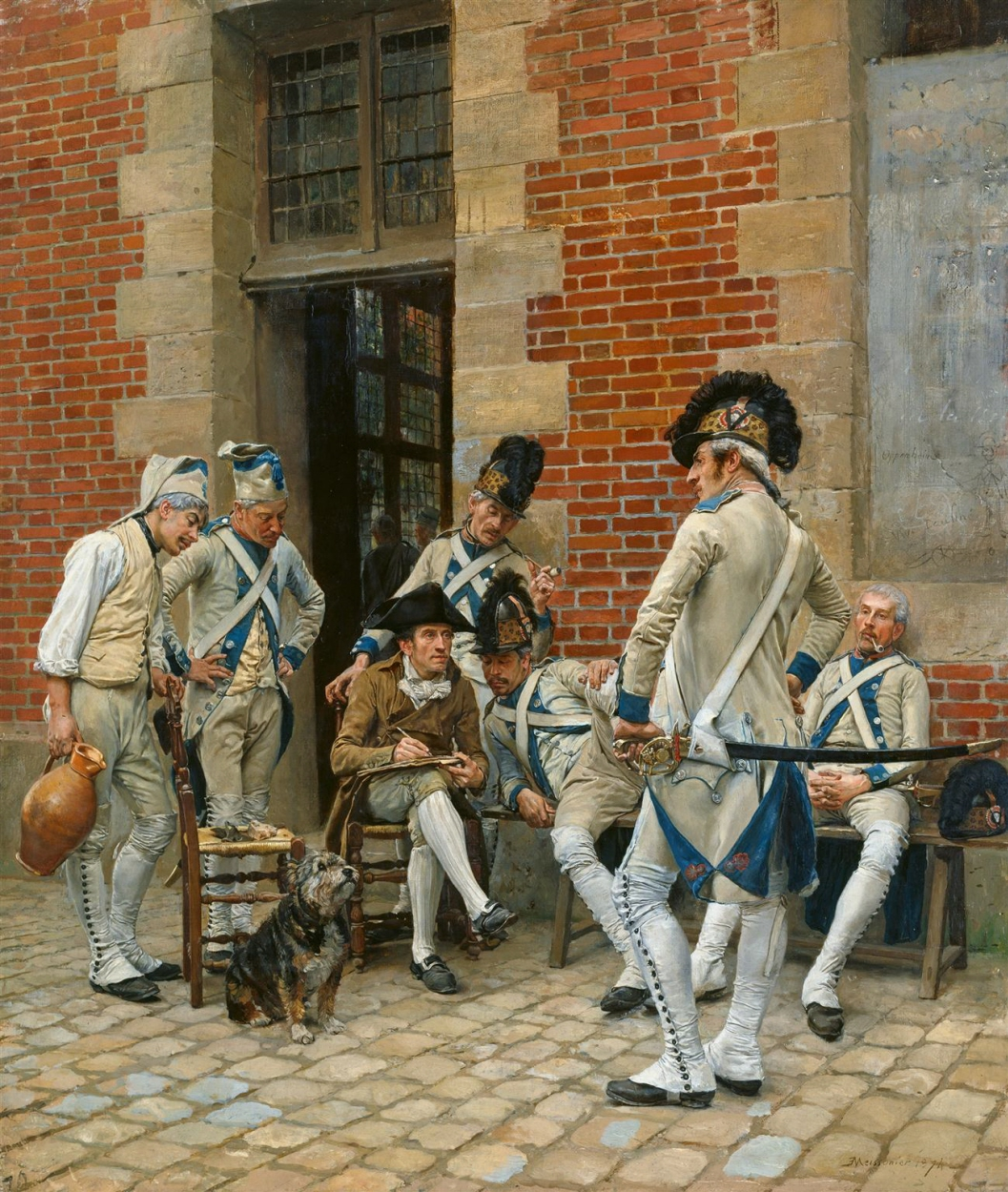
An artist is drawing a sergeant in uniform model 1791. Sergeants were literate and many came from the petty bourgeoisie.

The sergeants were selected by the company commander, amongst the privates and corporals of the company and regiment. If suitable candidates were not found within the company, the company commander usually selected a member of the grenadier company for promotion. Privates were usually promoted directly to the rank of sergeant, bypassing the rank of corporal. Promotion to sergeant therefore took place at a younger age than promotion to corporal. The sergeants were selected on the basis of proven or expected command ability as well as literacy. While most sergeants were able to read and write, about a third of the corporals were illiterate. Among the privates, however, only 25% were literate. As literacy played a decisive role in the selection of sergeant, a definite social pattern was found amongst them. While the proportion of petty bourgeoisie and higher classes amongst the rank and file gradually diminished during the 18th century, their share of the non-commissioned officer corps increased from about 25% to 33% during the century.

== Promotion tracks in the officer corps ==
There were in reality three discrete promotion tracks for officers in the French army during the 18th century. One for the high nobility, one for the middle and lower nobility and the higher bourgeoisie, and one for promoted sergeants. The foundation for this trisection was the existence of both an officially sanctioned purchase system, vénalité, and an illegal purchase system, concordat, functioning like the legal purchase of commissions in the British Army. Colonels of regiments and captains of companies officially bought their billets, since French Army administration was based on regimental and company proprietorship. The commanding officers advanced their own means to equip the regiment and the company. Reimbursement from the Crown was often late in coming, especially during war. The commanders used false musters and other underhand methods to build up funds to cover expenses. A purchase was hence required, in order to compensate the old proprietor for his investments in the unit. This was officially recognized by the Crown. Besides this, there was among officers of all ranks a common, yet unofficial and illegal, scheme of selling the commission to one's successor upon promotion or retirement.

== High nobility ==
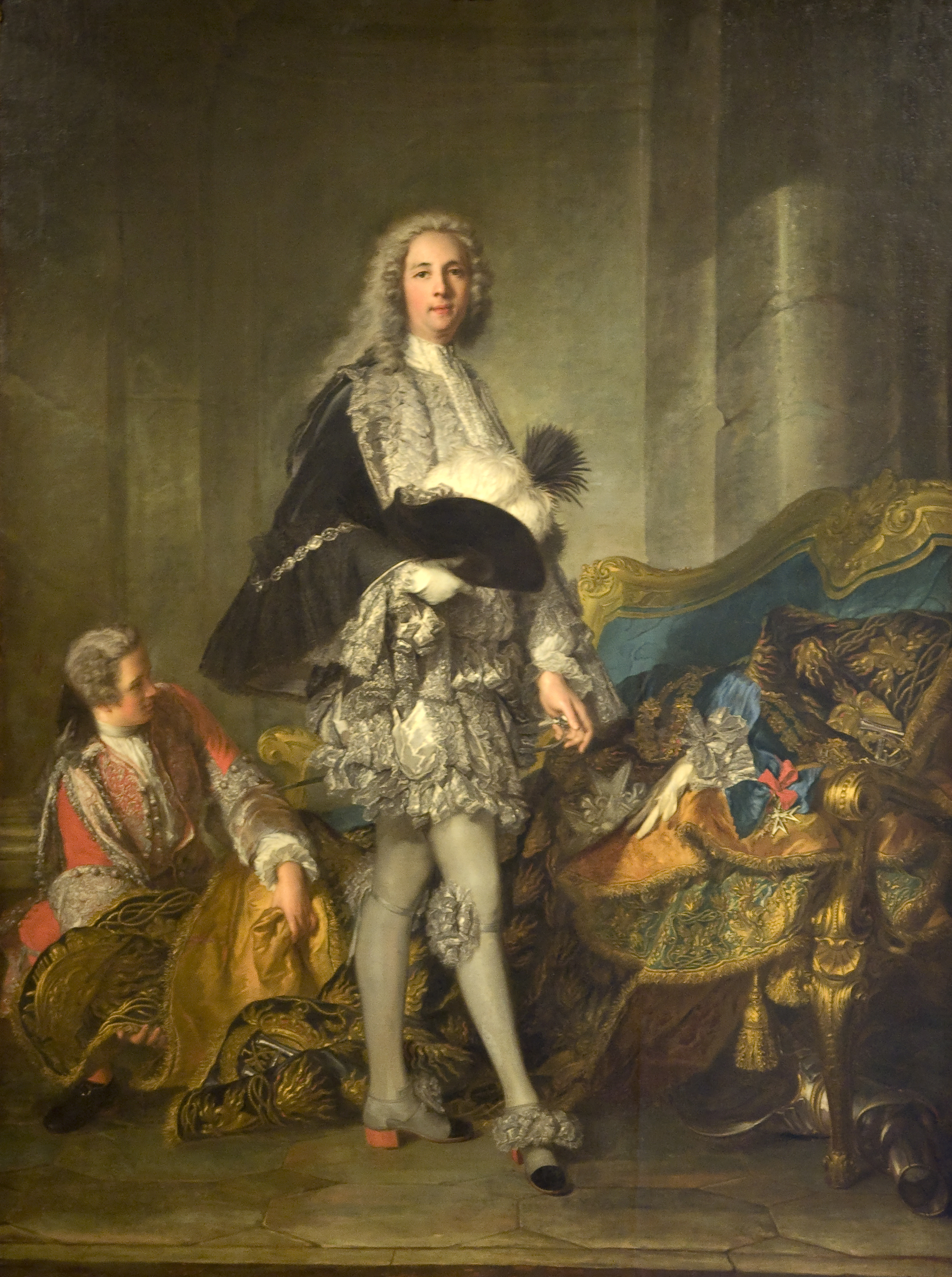
The high nobility had a yellow brick road to high command. Duke Louis François Armand de Vignerot du Plessis de Richelieu on his way to the marshal's baton.

The most exclusive and speediest promotion track was reserved for the high nobility, the noblesse présentée, with access to the King and the royal court and having the ability to hold high office. They were members of the noble families that could show that they had been nobles since the 14th century, thereby laying claim to a Frankish descent and nobility by race. The young aristocrat began his military career as a young or very young officer cadet or supernumerary second lieutenant. After a few years, his father bought him a company command; after some more years he or his father bought a regimental command. Later promotions to general officer rank were, however, based on merit, not birth.

== Nobility and bourgeoisie ==
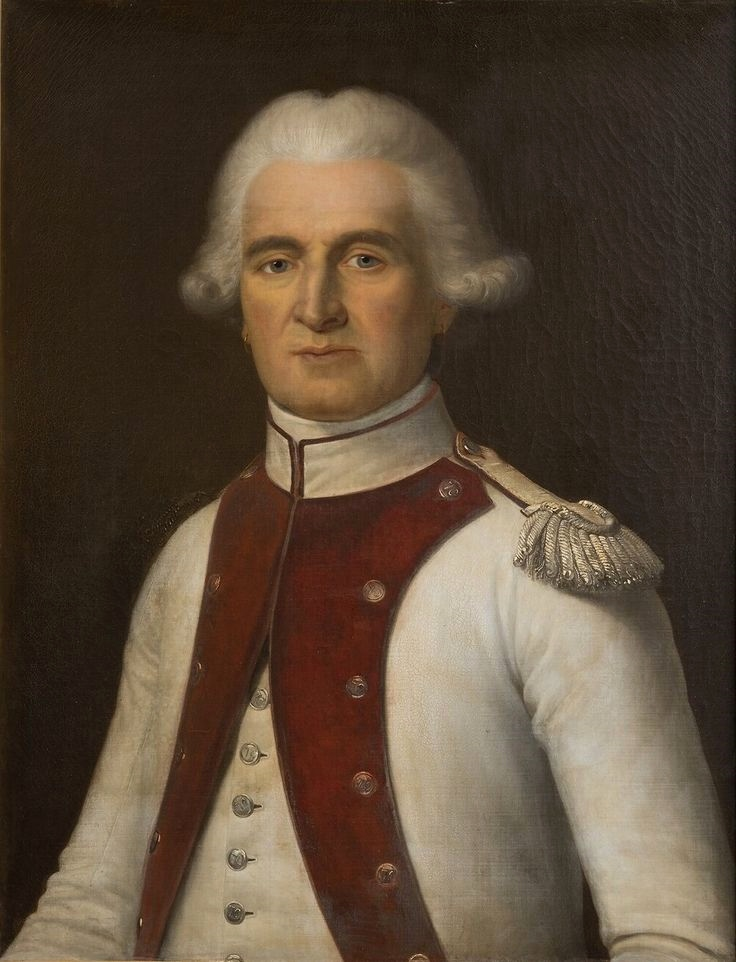
Jean-Mathieu-Philibert Sérurier was an officer from the petty nobility who reached modest rank in the Royal army. Under Napoleon he became a Marshal of France.

The standard promotion track was open to both the middle and the petty nobility, as well as to the higher bourgeoisie. The middle nobility, the noblesse non-presentée, had the right to attend court, but not to hold high office, while the petty nobility, the annoblis, had neither the right to hold high office nor to attend court. The officers of bourgeoisie birth were a decided minority, at the time of the French Revolution about 10% of the officer corps. This promotion track began by appointment to the lowest officer rank, then gradual promotion by seniority to captain. At each step an illicit change of money took place. A captain's command required a more significant, and officially approved, monetary outlay. From captain promotion took place directly to lieutenant colonel by seniority, and from that rank it was possible to be promoted directly to brigadier based on merit, and from thence to general officers rank, also on merit. Those lacking funds to buy a company command, could become captain of grenadiers, a billet not open to venalité.

== Rankers ==
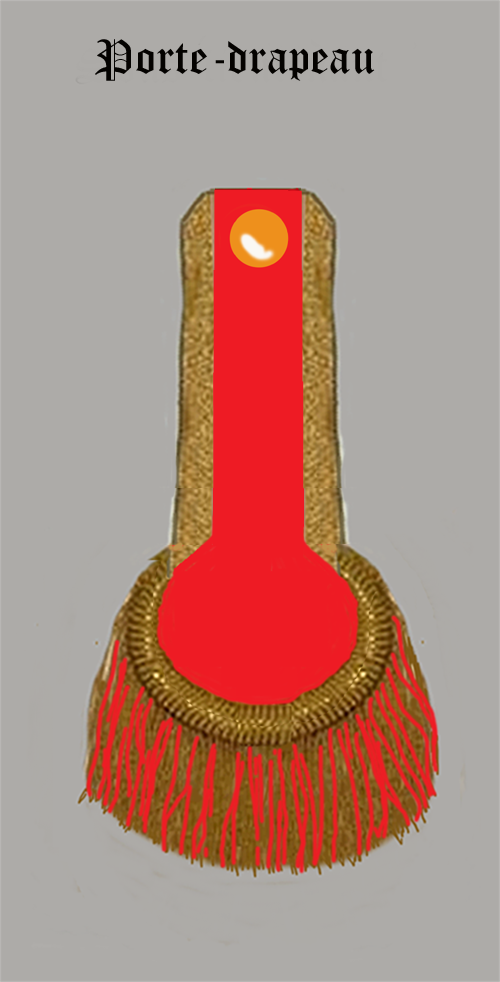
Rank insignia of a port-drapeau, 1786; a rank reserved for promoted sergeants.

The third promotion track was reserved for promoted sergeants, most often sergeants of grenadiers. These rankers, or officiers de fortune, were ordinarily non-commissioned officers with very long time under the colors, 20 years or more. Certain officer billets were reserved for rankers. In each regiment there were two rankers as portes-drapeaux, color bearers with the rank of second lieutenant. The two second lieutenants and the two lieutenants of grenadiers, as well as the regimental quartermaster were also rankers. Normally a ranker could not reach higher than substantive lieutenant and captain by brevet. In exceptional cases they could hold company command and later be promoted to major and lieutenant colonel. Rankers could also become aides-majors, regimental adjutants, until this billet was abolished in 1776. From adjutant it was possible to be promoted to major. Lack of money and old age prevented promotion of many rankers. The officiers de fortune took care of the daily routine that many of their brother officers from the nobility found less attractive. In spite of this, they were the first to be put on half-pay when peacetime cutbacks were put into effect. Even if some of them kept their nom de guerre, they were all keen to observe an officer-like conduct.

== Lack of social homogeneity in the officer corps ==
The three different promotion tracks created a lack of social homogeneity in the French Army officer corps. Of the 9,600 officers of field and company grade in 1789, 6,650 were noblemen, 1,850 commoners from the higher bourgeoisie, and 1,100 rankers. Among the noblemen, an abyss separated the high from the petty nobility. The speedy promotions of the high nobility made contemporary sources refer to colonels à la bavette (colonels with bibs), pointing to the obvious antagonism between these and the older seasoned officers in the standard promotion track that served under younger and less experienced commanders. The median age for promotion to colonel was 36 years, while for captains with company commands it was 45 years. The common saying in the army was that one was born either to be colonel or to be captain. The social background of the rankers deviated significantly from the rank and file. A study shows that 48% came from the petty bourgeoisie, 18% from the higher bourgeoisie, and 11% from the nobility. Many families of the petty nobility could not afford to support a son during the one or two years without pay he had to serve as a supernumerary second lieutenant or as a badly paid officer cadet and he had to seek his fortune in the ranks. There were also commoner families who had a tradition of service as non-commissioned officers, and some of them managed to reach officer rank.

== Failed reforms ==
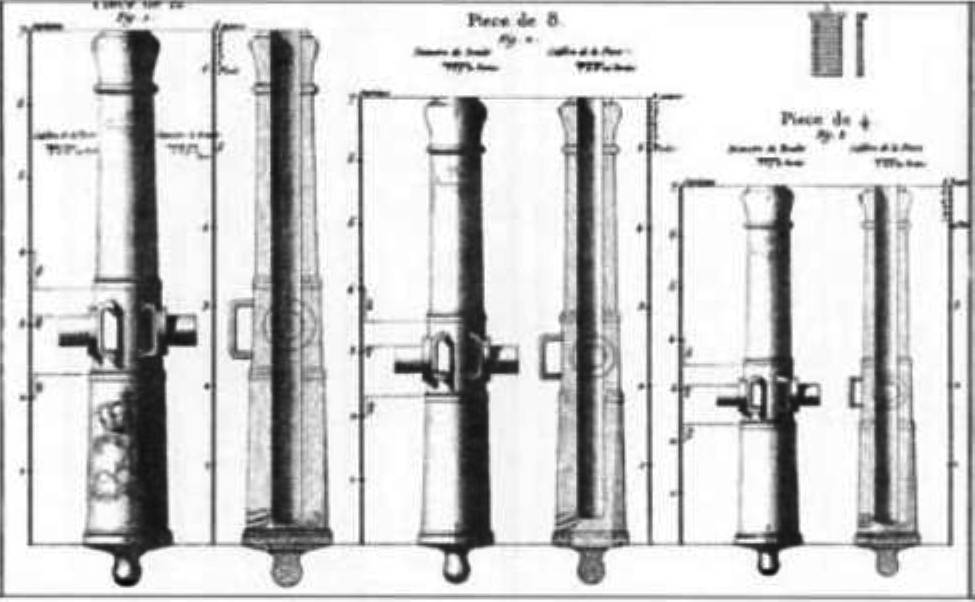
The Gribeauval system of artillery was the most successful technical reform at the end of the Ancien Regime. The comprehensive reforms planned for the structure of the officers corps, failed however.

The French defeat in the Seven Years' War led to extensive military reforms. Many of the tactical and technical improvements then introduced laid the groundwork for the French victories during the Revolutionary and Napoleonic Wars. Both the high nobility and the higher bourgeoisie were the targets, when progressive ministers of war tried to create a professionalized officer corps built on the petty nobility. The Ségur decree, requiring four quarterings of nobility as a condition for the appointment of officers, was not the result of an aristocratic reaction, but part of an attempt to professionalize the officer corps through the creation of military schools for poor sons of the nobility, the centralizing of the promotion system, the gradual abolishment of the vénalité, and the exclusion of rich bourgeois parvenus. Yet, the professionalization efforts failed as the privileged promotion track of the high nobility remained in place, creating a devastating crack within the French nobility. Many officers from the petty nobility began to be in agreement with the civilian bourgeoisie who saw themselves as the victims of discriminatory prerogatives.

== The French Revolution and Napoleon ==
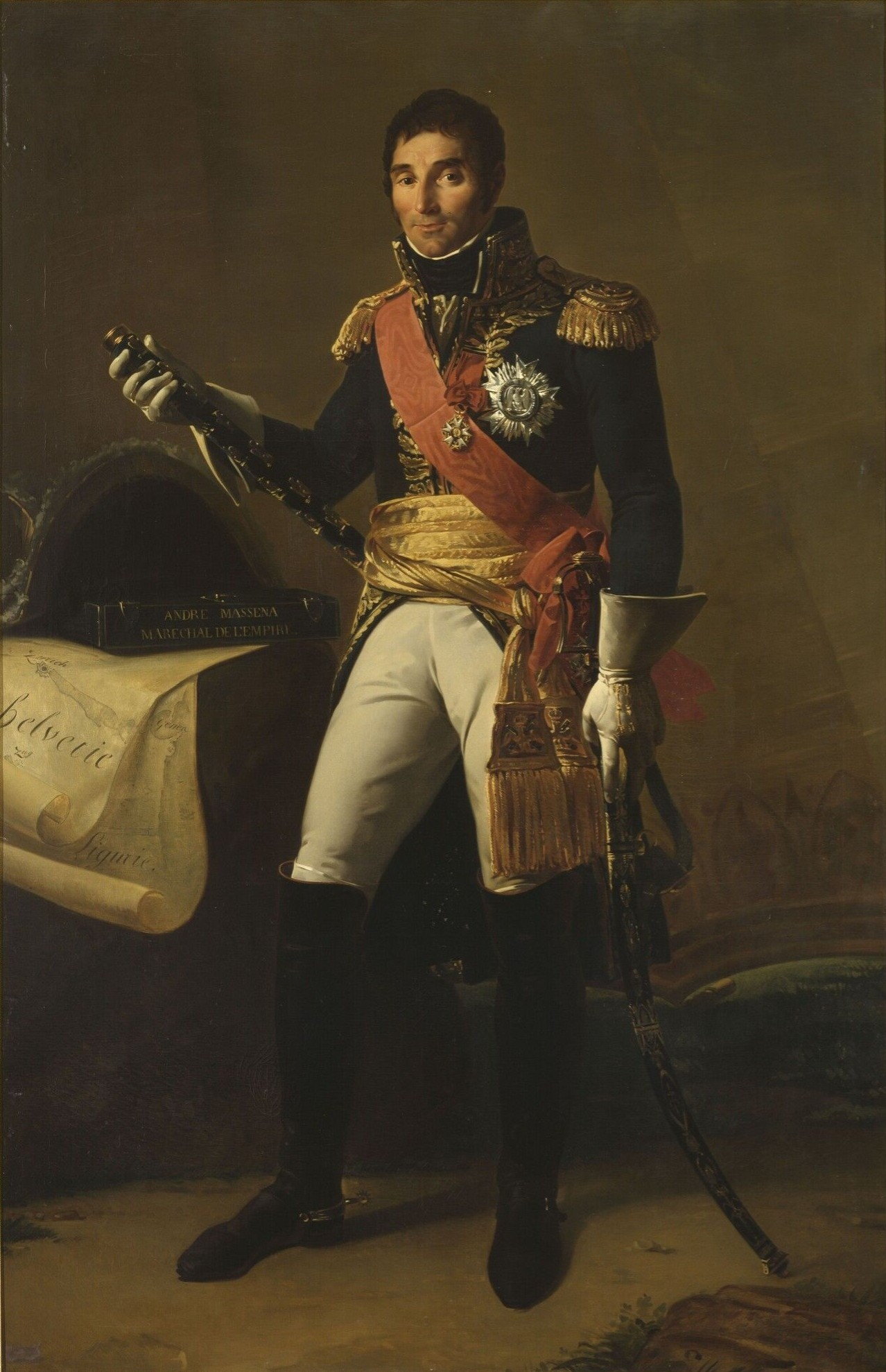
André Masséna was one whose military talents were liberated by the French Revolution. As a sergeant-major, it was not long after the revolution before he became a general and later a Marshal of France.

The French Revolution changed everything. Conscription replaced volunteer enlistment. The right to hold office irrespective of birth or descent was enshrined in law. The term for non-commissioned officer was changed to sous-officier from bas-officier which was regarded as demeaning. Regulations favoring sergeants as well as the flight of the nobility created an officer corps who under Napoleon contained 75% former sergeants. During two years the proportion of nobility in the officer corps diminished from 80% to 5%. However, the large number of sergeants becoming officers depleted the military competency of the non-commissioned officer corps.

The merger of the regular (formerly royal) army and the newly raised regiments of volunteers in 1793 saw the creation of a promotion system based on both seniority and election by the troops. During Napoleon, the commanding officer of the regiment appointed corporals and sergeants. Half of the company grade officers were promoted through selection by the commanding officer, the other half by the election of the troops, although the commanding officer exercised great influence as he choose the candidates for promotion. Field grade officers were promoted through both seniority and selection, general officers only by selection. Election of officers gradually disappeared, but took in singular cases place as late as in 1812. In 1805, four years in the lower rank was established as the minimum time before further promotion could take place, but that was a rule that which was not followed later. In 1811, it was stipulated that two years service was required to become a corporal, four years to become a sergeant, and eight years to become a second lieutenant. The Grande Armée was an army officered by the bourgeoisie; over half of the officers came from the higher bourgeoisie, a third from the petty bourgeoisie, and a sixth from the peasantry. The number of officers from the old nobility was higher than the number from the working class. Three-fourths were former sergeants, while one-fourth was appointed directly from civilian life.

== See also ==
- Social background of officers and other ranks in the British Army, 1750–1815
