= Charles Claude Jacquinot =

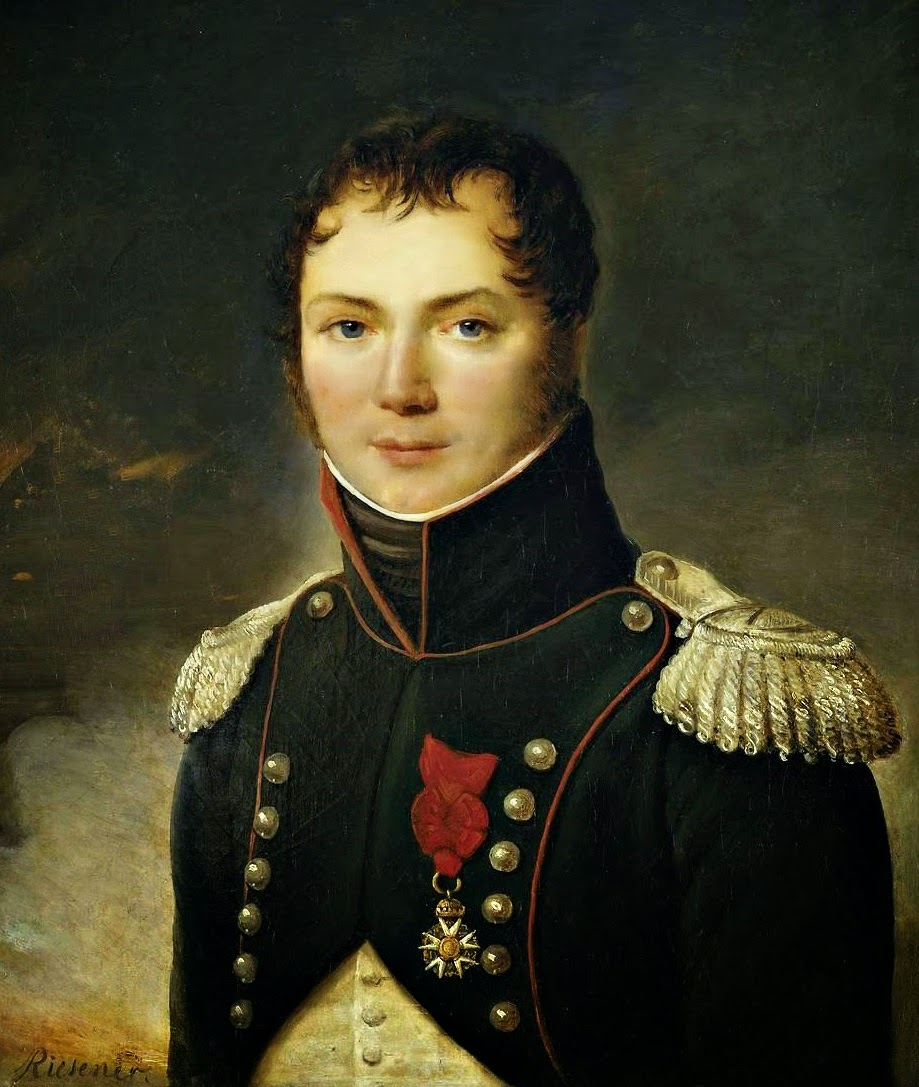
- Charles Claude Jacquinot
- Born: 3 August 1772; Melun, France
- Died: 24 April 1848 (aged 75) Metz, Moselle, France
- Allegiance: France
- Branch: Cavalry
- Service years: 1791–1839
- Rank: General of Division
- Conflicts: See battles: War of the First Coalition; War of the Second Coalition; Battle of Hohenlinden; War of the Third Coalition; Battle of Austerlitz; War of the Fourth Coalition; Battle of Jena; War of the Fifth Coalition; Battle of Abensberg; Battle of Raab; Battle of Wagram; War of the Sixth Coalition; Battle of Ostrovno; Battle of Smolensk; Battle of Borodino; Battle of Dennewitz; Battle of Leipzig; Battle of Bar-sur-Aube; Battle of Saint-Dizier; Hundred Days; Battle of Waterloo
- Awards: Légion d'Honneur, GC 1844
- Other work: Baron of the Empire, 1808; Peer of France, 1837

Charles Claude Jacquinot (English: /ʒɑːkiːˈnoʊ/ zha-ki-NOH, French: [ʃaʁl klod ʒakino]; 3 August 1772 – 24 April 1848) commanded a French cavalry division at the Battle of Waterloo in 1815. He joined a volunteer battalion in 1791 and transferred to a light cavalry regiment as a junior officer in 1793. He earned promotion to squadron commander and was acting commander of his regiment at Hohenlinden in 1800. After serving in a staff position at Austerlitz in 1805, he led a light cavalry regiment at Jena in 1806. Promoted to general of brigade he led his horsemen at Abensberg, Raab and Wagram in 1809. During the French invasion of Russia he fought at Ostrovno, Smolensk and Borodino in 1812. During the 1813 German Campaign he led a cavalry brigade at Dennewitz and Leipzig. After being appointed general of division he fought at Second Bar-sur-Aube and Saint-Dizier in 1814. During the Hundred Days he rallied to Napoleon and led a light cavalry division in the Waterloo campaign. After 15 years of inactivity, he was restored to favor in the 1830s. Thereafter he held a number of commands and was appointed to the Chamber of Peers. His surname is one of the names inscribed under the Arc de Triomphe, on Column 20.

== Revolution ==
Jacquinot was born in Melun on 3 August 1772. After attending military school at Pont-à-Mousson he joined the 1st Battalion of Meurthe Volunteers as a lieutenant in 1791. He transferred to the 1st Chasseurs à Cheval Regiment as a sous-lieutenant in 1793. Two years later he was appointed aide-de-camp to Pierre de Ruel, marquis de Beurnonville as a lieutenant. During the War of the First Coalition, the 1st Chasseurs fought at the battles of Arlon in 1793, Fleurus in 1794, Altenkirchen in 1796 and Neuwied in 1797. During the War of the Second Coalition the regiment fought at the battles of Ostrach and Stockach in 1799.

During the 1800 campaign, Jacquinot received a battlefield promotion from captain to major after an action at Erbach an der Donau. He was wounded at the Battle of Hohenlinden on 3 December 1800 while acting commander of the regiment in the absence of Colonel Louis-Pierre Montbrun. At Hohenlinden the 610-strong 1st Chasseurs served in Antoine Richepanse's division. The regiment fought at the front of Richepanse's decisive attack on the rear of the main Austrian column. Subsequently he led the 1st Chasseurs in clashes at Schwanenstadt and Vöcklabruck on 18 December. At Schwanenstadt, the French captured 700 Austrian cavalrymen and at Vöcklabruck they made prisoners of General Franz von Löpper, two cannons and most of two battalions of infantry. Subsequently, Jacquinot transferred to the 5th Chasseurs à Cheval.

== Empire ==
=== 1805–1809 ===
At the Battle of Austerlitz on 2 December 1805, Jacquinot served as an aide-de-camp to Géraud Duroc who led a formation of grenadiers. He became colonel on 13 January 1806, taking command of the 11th Chasseurs à Cheval Regiment. He led his regiment at the Battle of Jena on 14 October 1806 and was wounded by several saber cuts. At Jena, the 11th Chasseurs were in Pierre Margaron's light cavalry brigade of the IV Corps under Marshal of France Jean-de-Dieu Soult. He was raised to the dignity of Baron of the Empire on 26 October 1808.

Jacquinot received promotion to general of brigade on 10 March 1809. He received command of a brigade of cavalry in Montbrun's light cavalry division in the III Corps of Marshal Louis-Nicolas Davout. On 16 April he had 1,797 troopers under his command in the 1st, 2nd and 12th Chasseurs à Cheval Regiments. On 20 April, Napoleon formed for Marshal Jean Lannes a provisional corps made up of Jacquinot's detached brigade, two III Corps infantry divisions and two cuirassier divisions. In the Battle of Abensberg Lannes' corps drove the Austrian left wing back 10 miles (16 km) and inflicted losses of 2,700 killed and wounded and 4,000 captured on their foes. Jacquinot's brigade fought at the Battle of Raab on 14 June under Montbrun's command. On this occasion, it included the 7th Hussars in place of the 12th Chasseurs. During the battle, the divisions of Montbrun and Emmanuel Grouchy routed the Austrian left flank cavalry. Still in Montbrun's division, Jacquinot led his 1,219-strong brigade at the Battle of Wagram on 5–6 July where it formed part of the right wing cavalry under the orders of Davout. On the second day, Davout's cavalry gained the upper hand despite the intervention of the Austrian reserve cavalry personally led by Archduke Charles, Duke of Teschen.

=== 1812–1814 ===
During the 1812 French invasion of Russia Jacquinot led a brigade composed of the 7th Hussar and 9th Chevau-léger Lancer Regiments. The 3rd Light Cavalry Brigade was part of Jean Pierre Joseph Bruyère's 1st Light Cavalry Division in Étienne Marie Antoine Champion de Nansouty's I Cavalry Corps. During the campaign, he led his brigade at the battles of Ostrovno, Vitebsk, Smolensk and Borodino. Near Mozhaysk his brigade fought off Matvei Platov's Don Cossacks.

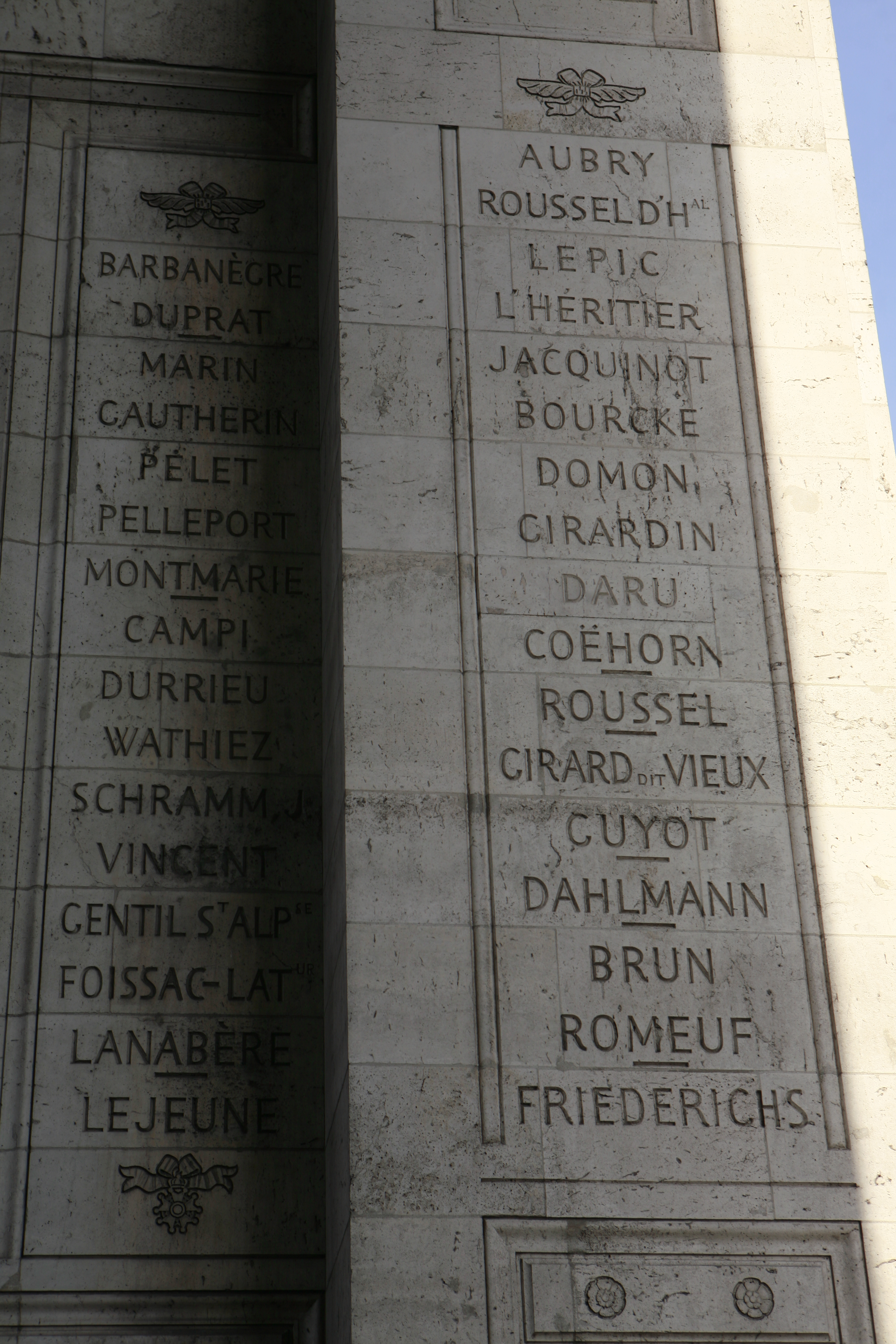
Jacquinot is the 5th name under the Arc de Triomphe's Column 20, at right.

Jacquinot was wounded while leading a charge against a Swedish battalion at the Battle of Dennewitz on 6 September 1813. During the action, he led the 12th Light Cavalry Brigade which was made up of the 5th and 13th Chasseurs à Cheval Regiments. The brigade was part of Jean Thomas Guillaume Lorge's 5th Light Cavalry Division in Jean-Toussaint Arrighi de Casanova's III Cavalry Corps. At the Battle of Leipzig on 16–19 October he led the same brigade, to which was added the 10th Chasseurs à Cheval. He was promoted general of division on 26 October 1813.

On the night of 31 December 1813, Russian troops under Emmanuel de Saint-Priest executed a successful assault crossing of the Rhine River and captured Koblenz at 4:00 am on 1 January 1814. The commander of the Russian 17th Infantry Division, Igor Maximovich Pillar sent 200 jägers, 25 Cossacks and one cannon to seize a convoy near Remagen on 2 January. The convoy was intercepted, but the officer directing the column continued marching toward Bonn where he bumped into a large French force under Jacquinot and Joseph Jean-Baptiste Albert. The Russians were routed, losing 120 men and the artillery piece, the first cannon lost by the Army of Silesia. At that date, Jacquinot's heavy cavalry division in the III Cavalry Corps had two weak brigades composed of single-squadron regiments. Marc François Jérôme Wolff's brigade counted 368 officers and men from five dragoon regiments. Jean Charles Quinette de Cernay's brigade numbered 467 troopers from five dragoon and one cuirassier regiments.

By mid-January, the French forces under Marshal Jacques MacDonald, which included III Cavalry Corps, were in full retreat through Namur and headed for an intended rendezvous with Napoleon at Châlons-sur-Marne. After detaching garrisons, MacDonald's command numbered no more than 11,000 men. From Châlons, MacDonald's force was chased to the west by the Army of Silesia. Around this time, Napoleon reorganized his cavalry into four corps plus an independent division and the III Cavalry Corps was suppressed. Jacquinot was placed in command of the two-brigade 4th Light Cavalry Division in the new VI Cavalry Corps under François Étienne de Kellermann. Auguste Jean Ameil's 979-strong 7th Brigade included six regiments of chasseurs à cheval while Wolff's 686-man 8th Brigade comprised three hussar, one chevau-léger lancer and two chasseurs à cheval regiments.

On 25 February 1814, Napoleon decided to leave the pursuit of the Army of Bohemia to his subordinates. The emperor assigned Jacquinot's division and Kellermann's corps to Marshal Nicolas Oudinot while distributing other cavalry units to MacDonald. Jacquinot's division fought at the Battle of Bar-sur-Aube on 27 February and at the Battle of Saint-Dizier on 26 March. During Napoleon's bid to cut the Allied communications in the last week of March, he sent the light cavalry of Jacquinot and Hippolyte Piré ahead of the army, provoking panic. At Saint-Dizier, Napoleon's cavalry routed Ferdinand von Wintzingerode's 10,000 cavalry, but it proved to be a hollow victory because the Allied generals ignored the threat to their supply line and marched on Paris. The Allies won the Battle of Paris on 30 March 1814 and this event ended the war. By 4 April the 4th Cavalry Division had shrunk badly. Ameil's brigade counted only 331 officers and men while Wolff's brigade numbered only 244.

== Later career ==
During the Waterloo Campaign, Jacquinot commanded the 1st Cavalry Division which was attached to the I Corps of Jean-Baptiste Drouet, Comte d'Erlon. The 1st Brigade of Adrien François de Bruno consisted of the 3rd Chasseurs à Cheval and 7th Hussar Regiments. The 2nd Brigade of Martin Gobrecht was made up of the 3rd and 4th Chevau-léger Lancer Regiments. During the Battle of Waterloo on 18 June 1815 Jacquinot supervised his own and the light cavalry division of Jacques Gervais, baron Subervie. After the British heavy cavalry routed d'Erlon's infantry, the Royal Scots Greys charged through the French grand battery, only to be counterattacked by Jacquinot's lancers and cut to pieces. At Waterloo the Greys lost 102 killed and 97 wounded out of 396 officers and men.

After Waterloo, Jacquinot was placed on the inactive list. Years later he emerged as an inspector general of cavalry. In 1833 he was appointed to command the camp of cuirassiers at Lunéville and the following year he commanded the camp of dragoons. In 1835 he was assigned to lead the 3rd Military Division at Metz. He became a member of the Peerage of France on 3 October 1837; that year he went on the inactive list again. According to the law of 4 August 1839 he was appointed to the second section of the Army General Staff. On 14 April 1844 he received the Grand Cross of the Légion d'Honneur. He died on 25 April 1848 at Metz. JACQUINOT appears on the east side of the Arc de Triomphe.
