= VI Cavalry Corps (Grande Armée) =

- Active: February – April 1814
- Country: First French Empire
- Branch: French Imperial Army
- Type: Shock cavalry
- Size: Corps
- Engagements: War of the Sixth Coalition

Commanders
- Notable commanders: François Étienne de Kellermann

The VI Cavalry Corps of the Grande Armée was a French military unit that had an ephemeral existence during the Napoleonic Wars. The corps was created on 9 February 1814 and General François Étienne de Kellermann was appointed as its commander. The corps was formed by combining a newly arrived dragoon division from the Spanish front, a second dragoon division, and a light cavalry division made up of hussars and Chasseurs-à-Cheval. The latter two divisions included units from the former III Cavalry Corps. Kellermann led the VI Cavalry Corps at Mormant, Troyes, Bar-sur-Aube, Laubressel, and Saint-Dizier. After Emperor Napoleon Bonaparte abdicated in early April, the corps ceased to exist.

== Organization ==
At the Battle of La Rothière on 1 February 1814, 80,000 Coalition troops led by Gebhard Leberecht von Blücher defeated 45,000 French soldiers led by Napoleon. The Coalition sustained 6,000–7,000 casualties while the French lost 5,600 men and 73 artillery pieces. After the battle, the French Army retreated to Nogent-sur-Seine, where Napoleon reorganized his cavalry into the I Cavalry, II Cavalry, V Cavalry and VI Cavalry Corps, an independent division led by General Jean-Marie Defrance and three divisions of Imperial Guard cavalry. General François Étienne de Kellermann was appointed commander of the VI Cavalry Corps, which was to include cavalry under General Anne-François-Charles Trelliard that transferred from the Spanish front. The necessary orders were issued on 9 February, but the organization of Kellermann's corps was not fully carried out until 20 February. In July 1813 during the Battle of the Pyrenees, Trelliard's 2,300-strong division consisted of the 4th, 14th, 16th, 17th, 21st, and 26th Dragoon Regiments. After the Battle of the Nive in December 1813, all of Trelliard's dragoons and some of General Pierre Benoît Soult's cavalry were transferred from the Spanish frontier to the campaign in northeast France.

On 1 January 1814, the III Cavalry Corps under General Jean-Toussaint Arrighi de Casanova consisted of a light cavalry division led by General Jean Thomas Guillaume Lorge and a heavy cavalry division under General Charles Claude Jacquinot. Lorge's division was made up of the 5th, 10th, 13th, 15th, 21st, 22nd, and 29th Chasseurs-à-Cheval and the 2nd, 4th, and 12th Hussar Regiments. Jacquinot's division included the 13th Cuirassier and the 4th, 5th, 12th, 16th, 17th, 21st, 24th, 26th, and 27th Dragoon Regiments. The two divisions were supported by four 6-pound cannons and two howitzers of the 5th Company of the 1st Horse Artillery Regiment and the 2nd Company of the 1st Principal Train Battalion. While many units had under 100 cavalrymen, the largest unit was the 303-strong 13th Chasseurs and the weakest was the 16-man 4th Hussars. On 25 January 1814, when the bulk of the field army assembled at Châlons-sur-Marne, the III Cavalry Corps was reorganized into a light cavalry division under General Auguste Jean Ameil and a heavy cavalry division led by Jacquinot. Ameil's division had 201 sabers in the 1st Provisional Hussar Regiment and 842 in the 2nd Provisional Chasseur Regiment while Jacquinot counted 740 horsemen in the 3rd Provisional Dragoons and 72 in the 4th Provisional Cuirassiers.

The provisional regiments were abandoned when the III Cavalry Corps was suppressed and the new VI Cavalry Corps was created on 20 February. At that time, Jacquinot assumed leadership of the 4th Light Cavalry Division which largely incorporated the regiments of the Lorge-Ameil division. Its two brigade commanders were Ameil and Marc François Jérôme Wolff. General Nicolas-François Roussel d'Hurbal took command of the 6th Heavy Cavalry Division which included the 5th and 12th Dragoons from Jacquinot's old division plus the 21st and 26th Dragoons from Trelliard's division. Roussel's brigadiers were Louis Ernest Joseph Sparre and Antoine Rigaud. Trelliard's 5th Heavy Cavalry Division consisted of the 4th, 14th, 16th, 17th, 24th, and 27th Dragoon Regiments. Trelliard's brigade commanders were Pierre Ismert and François Léon Ormancey.

== History ==
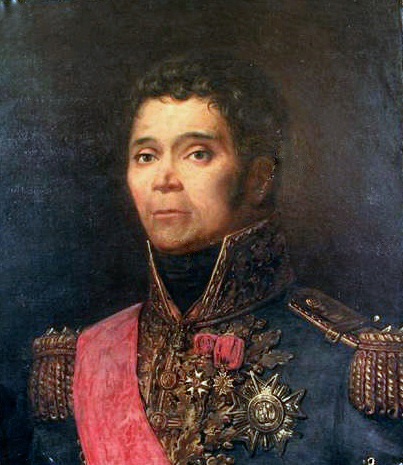
Kellermann the Younger

On 12 November 1813, Napoleon ordered General Horace Sebastiani to take command of the V Corps and III Cavalry Corps and defend Koblenz. Sebastiani had only 4,500 troops to protect this part of the Rhine River. The Army of Silesia under Marshal Gebhard Leberecht von Blücher successfully crossed the Rhine near Koblenz on 2 January 1814, rendering the French position untenable. On 13 January, Marshal Jacques MacDonald ordered Sebastiani to retreat to Aachen. By 26 January, MacDonald and Sebastiani and about 10,000 men were near Sainte-Menehould and marching toward Châlons-sur-Marne, which they reached on 30 January. On 5 February, MacDonald was chased out of Châlons by General Ludwig von Yorck's Prussians. In the next few days, Blücher tried to run down and destroy MacDonald's force, but the marshal managed to evade his pursuers by 9 February. In the unsuccessful effort to catch the French, Blücher allowed his army to become dangerously extended.

Over the following week, Napoleon won all the battles of the Six Days' Campaign, inflicting heavy casualties on Blücher's army. After his victories, the French emperor had to rush to the help of his forces defending the Seine River. These troops had been pushed back by the Army of Bohemia led by Field Marshal Karl von Schwarzenberg. Already, Napoleon ordered MacDonald to Guignes where he arrived on the evening of 14 February with 12,000 troops, including reinforcements. Trelliard's division arrived at Guignes on 16 February, fresh from the Spanish front. At this time, Kellermann's corps was not yet fully formed. Altogether, there would be 4,200 horsemen in the divisions of Jacquinot, Trelliard, and Roussel.

The Battle of Mormant began at dawn on 17 February when Marshal Claude Victor-Perrin's II Corps and four French cavalry divisions attacked General Peter Graf von der Pahlen's Russian corps. On the right flank, Kellermann commanded the divisions from the V Cavalry Corps and Trelliard. On the left flank were two more V Cavalry Corps divisions under General Édouard Jean Baptiste Milhaud. Lhéritier and Trelliard first scattered the Russian cavalry, then fell on the infantry opposing them. Pahlen's Russian infantry squares were broken and most of the troops cut down or captured. Later in the day, Trelliard's division was directed to pursue toward Provins and missed the action at Valjouan against the Bavarians. The French inflicted 3,114 casualties on the Allies and captured 9 guns and 40 caissons while losing 600 killed and wounded.

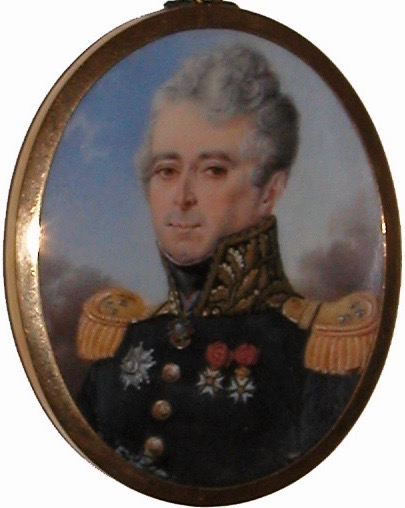
François-Charles Trelliard

Napoleon won the Battle of Montereau on 18 February, resulting in 5,000 Allied casualties and capturing 15 artillery pieces. This induced Schwarzenberg to fall back on first Troyes and then farther east on 23 February. Marshal Nicolas Oudinot pursued with Kellermann's cavalry, including Jacquinot's division, while MacDonald led a second pursuing column. On 27 February, Napoleon left Oudinot and MacDonald to watch Schwarzenberg's army with 42,000 men and marched with 35,000 troops against Blücher, who was headed for Paris. Napoleon took with him Roussel's division and Sparre's brigade, which arrived from Spain at this time. Subsequently, Roussel's detached division fought at the battles of Craonne, Laon, Fère-Champenoise and Paris.

At the Battle of Bar-sur-Aube on 27 February, Schwarzenberg attacked Oudinot by surprise, inflicting 3,060 casualties on the French while sustaining 2,400 casualties. Once the battle began, Kellermann crossed to the east bank of the Aube River. Jacquinot's division charged the Russian Lubny Hussars, mauling the regiment and driving off the Pskov Cuirassiers. Ismert's dragoon brigade charged a large Russian artillery battery three times. This foolhardy attack was repulsed and the 4th and 16th Dragoons suffered 400 killed and wounded between them. Nevertheless, Schwarzenberg was alarmed at the persistence of the French attacks and proceeded with caution. During the withdrawal, there was a brief panic when the infantry rearguard fled through the ranks of Kellermann's cavalry, but order was soon restored. After their defeat, the French withdrew to the west.

On 3 March 1814, Schwarzenberg defeated MacDonald in the Battle of Laubressel. At this time, Jacquinot's division numbered 1,258 sabers while Trelliard's division numbered 1,747 horsemen. At the start of the battle, Kellermann's cavalry was in reserve on the left flank near Pont Saint-Hubert. After the II Cavalry Corps was drawn into action, Kellermann's corps moved east to Saint-Parres-aux-Tertres. As the Russian infantry strove to turn the French left flank, they were charged by Kellermann's horsemen. When the VI Cavalry Corps retreated from Troyes on 4 March, Oudinot failed to provide for a rearguard. Bavarian cavalry suddenly appeared, causing the French horsemen to panic and flee. Luckily, the French infantry remained steady, but the Bavarian horsemen swept up 400 of their enemies.

On 14 March, Treillard led a 2,400-man reconnaissance toward Villenauxe-la-Grande which skirmished with the Allies before being pushed back. After his defeat at the Battle of Arcis-sur-Aube on 20–21 March, Napoleon crossed to the east bank of the Marne River. General Hippolyte Piré's light cavalry division raced toward Bar-sur-Aube while Jacquinot's division headed toward Chaumont-la-Ville. On 26 March, Napoleon defeated General Ferdinand von Wintzingerode at the Battle of Saint-Dizier. On the right flank, Kellermann led the pursuit. When Napoleon decided to march toward Paris, the divisions of Jacquinot and Piré were in the lead. Trelliard's division and an infantry division were the rearguard. On 2 April, the divisions of Trelliard and Jacquinot numbered much less than when the corps was first formed in February. The brigades of Jacquinot's division appeared to have largely switched units with the 2nd and 12th Hussars, the 13th, 21st, 22nd, and 28th Chasseurs in Ameil's 7th Brigade, and the 4th, 5th, 10th, and 15th Chasseurs in Wolff's 8th Brigade.

== Order of battle ==
VI Cavalry Corps: François Étienne de Kellermann
Division	Brigade	Regiment	Strength 20 Feb.	Strength 2 Apr.
4th Light Cavalry Division: Charles Claude Jacquinot	7th Brigade: Auguste Jean Ameil	4th Chasseurs-à-Cheval	123	60
4th Light Cavalry Division: Charles Claude Jacquinot	7th Brigade: Auguste Jean Ameil	5th Chasseurs-à-Cheval	207	65
4th Light Cavalry Division: Charles Claude Jacquinot	7th Brigade: Auguste Jean Ameil	10th Chasseurs-à-Cheval	170	82
4th Light Cavalry Division: Charles Claude Jacquinot	7th Brigade: Auguste Jean Ameil	13th Chasseurs-à-Cheval	303	111
4th Light Cavalry Division: Charles Claude Jacquinot	7th Brigade: Auguste Jean Ameil	15th Chasseurs-à-Cheval	93	37
4th Light Cavalry Division: Charles Claude Jacquinot	7th Brigade: Auguste Jean Ameil	28th Chasseurs-à-Cheval	83	38
4th Light Cavalry Division: Charles Claude Jacquinot	8th Brigade: Marc François Jérôme Wolff	2nd Hussars	178	13
4th Light Cavalry Division: Charles Claude Jacquinot	8th Brigade: Marc François Jérôme Wolff	4th Hussars	116	–
4th Light Cavalry Division: Charles Claude Jacquinot	8th Brigade: Marc François Jérôme Wolff	12th Hussars	64	136
4th Light Cavalry Division: Charles Claude Jacquinot	8th Brigade: Marc François Jérôme Wolff	9th Chasseurs-à-Cheval	116	–
4th Light Cavalry Division: Charles Claude Jacquinot	8th Brigade: Marc François Jérôme Wolff	21st Chasseurs-à-Cheval	95	19
4th Light Cavalry Division: Charles Claude Jacquinot	8th Brigade: Marc François Jérôme Wolff	22nd Chasseurs-à-Cheval	117	14
5th Heavy Cavalry Division: Anne-François-Charles Trelliard	9th Brigade: Pierre Ismert	4th Dragoons	570	197
5th Heavy Cavalry Division: Anne-François-Charles Trelliard	9th Brigade: Pierre Ismert	14th Dragoons	395	222
5th Heavy Cavalry Division: Anne-François-Charles Trelliard	9th Brigade: Pierre Ismert	16th Dragoons	255	151
5th Heavy Cavalry Division: Anne-François-Charles Trelliard	10th Brigade: François Léon Ormancey	17th Dragoons	339	257
5th Heavy Cavalry Division: Anne-François-Charles Trelliard	10th Brigade: François Léon Ormancey	24th Dragoons	106	222
5th Heavy Cavalry Division: Anne-François-Charles Trelliard	10th Brigade: François Léon Ormancey	27th Dragoons	502	–
6th Heavy Cavalry Division: Nicolas-François Roussel d'Hurbal	11th Brigade: Louis Ernest Joseph Sparre	5th Dragoons	532	detached
6th Heavy Cavalry Division: Nicolas-François Roussel d'Hurbal	11th Brigade: Louis Ernest Joseph Sparre	12th Dragoons	478	detached
6th Heavy Cavalry Division: Nicolas-François Roussel d'Hurbal	12th Brigade: Antoine Rigaud	21st Dragoons	621	detached
6th Heavy Cavalry Division: Nicolas-François Roussel d'Hurbal	12th Brigade: Antoine Rigaud	26th Dragoons	674	detached
