= Anne-François-Charles Trelliard =

Cavalry Commander during Napoleonic War

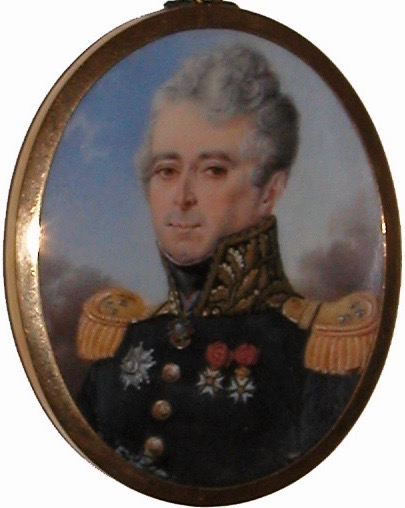
- General of Division Anne-François-Charles Trelliard
- Born: 7 February 1764; Parma, Italy
- Died: 14 May 1832 (aged 68) Charonne, France
- Allegiance: France
- Branch: Cavalry
- Service years: 1780–1815
- Rank: General of Division
- Conflicts: French Revolutionary Wars; Napoleonic Wars
- Awards: Légion d'Honneur
- Other work: Count of the Empire
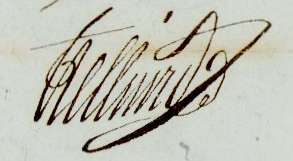
- Signature

Anne-François-Charles Trelliard or Treillard or Treilhard (7 February 1764 – 14 May 1832), joined the cavalry of the French Royal Army as a cadet gentleman in 1780. During the French Revolutionary Wars he fought in Germany and Holland, eventually rising in rank to become a general officer in 1799. He led a corps cavalry brigade at Austerlitz in the 1805 campaign. In the 1806–1807 campaign he fought at Saalfeld, Jena, and Pultusk.

Transferred to Spain in 1808, Trelliard led a dragoon division and participated in the third invasion of Portugal in 1810–1811. He commanded his dragoons at Majadahonda in 1812 and at Vitoria and the Pyrenees in 1813. His division was redeployed to eastern France for Emperor Napoleon's final futile campaign in 1814. After rallying to Napoleon during the Hundred Days, the Bourbons dismissed him from the army. Trelliard is one of the names inscribed under the Arc de Triomphe.

== Early career ==
Born on 7 February 1764 in Parma in the Duchy of Parma, Trelliard's parents, François de Treillard and Marie Anne de Cutry, were minor nobility. Baptised two days later, his godparents were François-Charles de Rochechouart and Marquise Malaspina della Bastia. On 6 November 1780, he joined the Reine (Queen's) Regiment of Dragoons as a gentleman cadet. Advancement was slow and he only became a sous lieutenant in 1785, a second lieutenant in 1788, a lieutenant subaltern in 1789, and a first lieutenant in 1791. After the start of the War of the First Coalition, promotion became more rapid. By August 1792, he was a captain in the 3rd Chasseurs à Cheval Regiment. In April 1793, he advanced to the rank of chef d'escadron (major) in the 11th Chasseurs after fighting in the Army of the North and other formations. On 1 September 1794 he received promotion to chef de brigade (colonel) of the 11th Chasseurs and fought with the Army of Sambre-et-Meuse. On 22 October, near Coblenz he defeated a superior force of opposing cavalry, inflicting losses of 200 casualties.

Historian Charles Mullié credits Trelliard with serving under Jean Victor Marie Moreau in the blockade of Mainz. This unsuccessful operation lasted from 20 September to 13 October 1795. However, another source places the 11th Chasseurs in François Séverin Marceau-Desgraviers' Division, which was involved in the futile blockade of Ehrenbreitstein Fortress from 15 September to 17 October. He seized some redoubts and 2,000 prisoners during the Battle of Neuwied on 18 April 1797. He was appointed general of brigade on 10 September 1799. Afterward he led the cavalry in the forces occupying the Batavian Republic. On 11 December 1803 he became a member of the Légion d'Honneur and a commander of the Légion on 14 June 1804.

== Early Empire ==
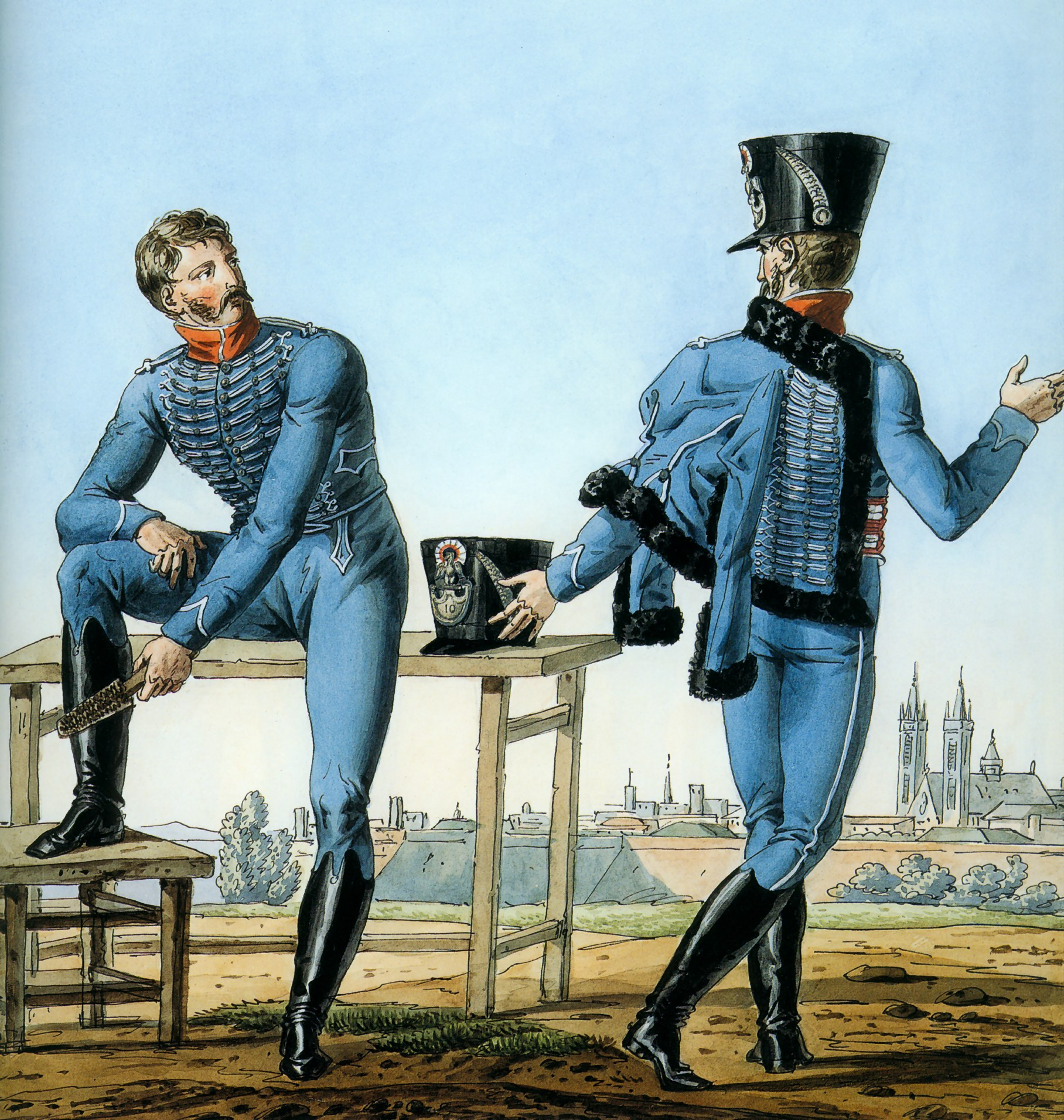
10th Hussar Regiment

Trelliard led the light cavalry of Marshal Jean Lannes' V Corps at the beginning of the War of the Third Coalition. He led the 9th and 10th Hussar Regiments at the Battle of Wertingen on 8 October 1805 during the Ulm Campaign. At the Battle of Austerlitz on 2 December, his command included the 9th and 10th Hussars and the 13th and 21st Chasseurs à Cheval. He fought on the left wing under Lannes.

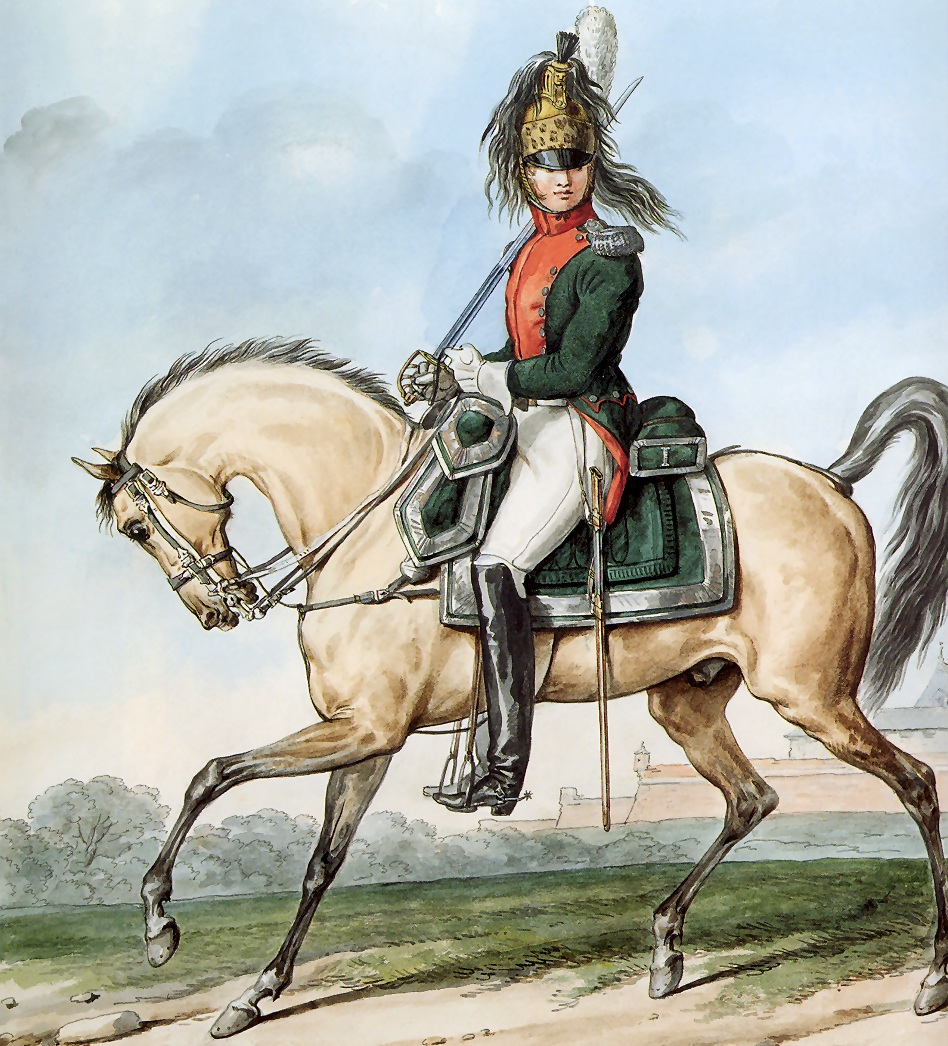
Colonel of Dragoons

Commanding nine squadrons of the 9th and 10th Hussars and the 21st Chasseurs at the outbreak of the War of the Fourth Coalition, Trelliard fought at the Battle of Saalfeld on 10 October 1806. During this action, Quartermaster Guindet of the 10th Hussars killed Prince Louis Ferdinand of Prussia in personal combat. Trelliard led his cavalrymen at the Battle of Jena on 14 October. Lannes posted his cavalry on the right wing at the Battle of Pultusk on 26 December. Lured into attacking Russian hussars, Trelliard's cavalry suffered serious loss when the enemy cavalry wheeled aside, exposing the French to the fire of a masked battery. He was badly wounded in the action. In the same month he received promotion to general of division.

In August 1808, Trelliard commanded a cavalry camp in Pau, France. That year transferred to Spain to fight in the Peninsular War. At first he served in the north of Spain on the Bay of Biscay where he led the 4th Dragoon Division. He became a Baron of the Empire on 9 March 1810. During the Siege of Ciudad Rodrigo in 1810, he commanded a covering force consisting four regiments of dragoons. Though he was not listed in the official Army of Portugal order of battle, which placed Louis Pierre, Count Montbrun in charge of the reserve cavalry, staff officer Jean-Jacques Germain Pelet-Clozeau stated that he led a cavalry division during the Siege of Almeida under Marshal André Masséna's personal command. After the Battle of Bussaco, Masséna ordered Montbrun to take command of the army's advance guard while Trelliard assumed direction of the reserve cavalry. In November 1810, he was assigned a task force that included two regiments of dragoons and some infantry. He conducted reconnaissances on at least two occasions during the winter. In February 1811, Trelliard led a cavalry division that was separate from Montbrun's. As the French withdrew from Portugal, he assisted Marshal Michel Ney's rear guard with three dragoon regiments on 10 March, the day before the Battle of Pombal.

== Later Empire ==
After the British victory at the Battle of Salamanca, his division was sent to delay the Marquess of Wellington's advance. In the Battle of Majadahonda, Trelliard led 2,000 cavalry against Wellington's 2,300-strong advance guard. His command included the 13th, 18th, 19th, and 22nd Dragoon Regiments, plus the Italian Napoleone Dragoon and Westphalian Chevau-léger Regiments. He was opposed to Benjamin d'Urban's 1st, 11th, and 12th Portuguese Dragoons, George Bock's 1st and 2nd King's German Legion (KGL) Dragoons, the 1st KGL Light Infantry Battalion, and four artillery pieces. Trelliard routed the Portuguese and captured three British guns. The French troopers then fell upon Bock's German dragoons and drove them back. Coming under fire from the KGL infantry in the village of Las Rozas and seeing reinforcements approaching, Trelliard ordered a withdrawal and abandoned his captured guns. The Portuguese suffered 108 casualties and the Germans lost 68. French losses were not reported.

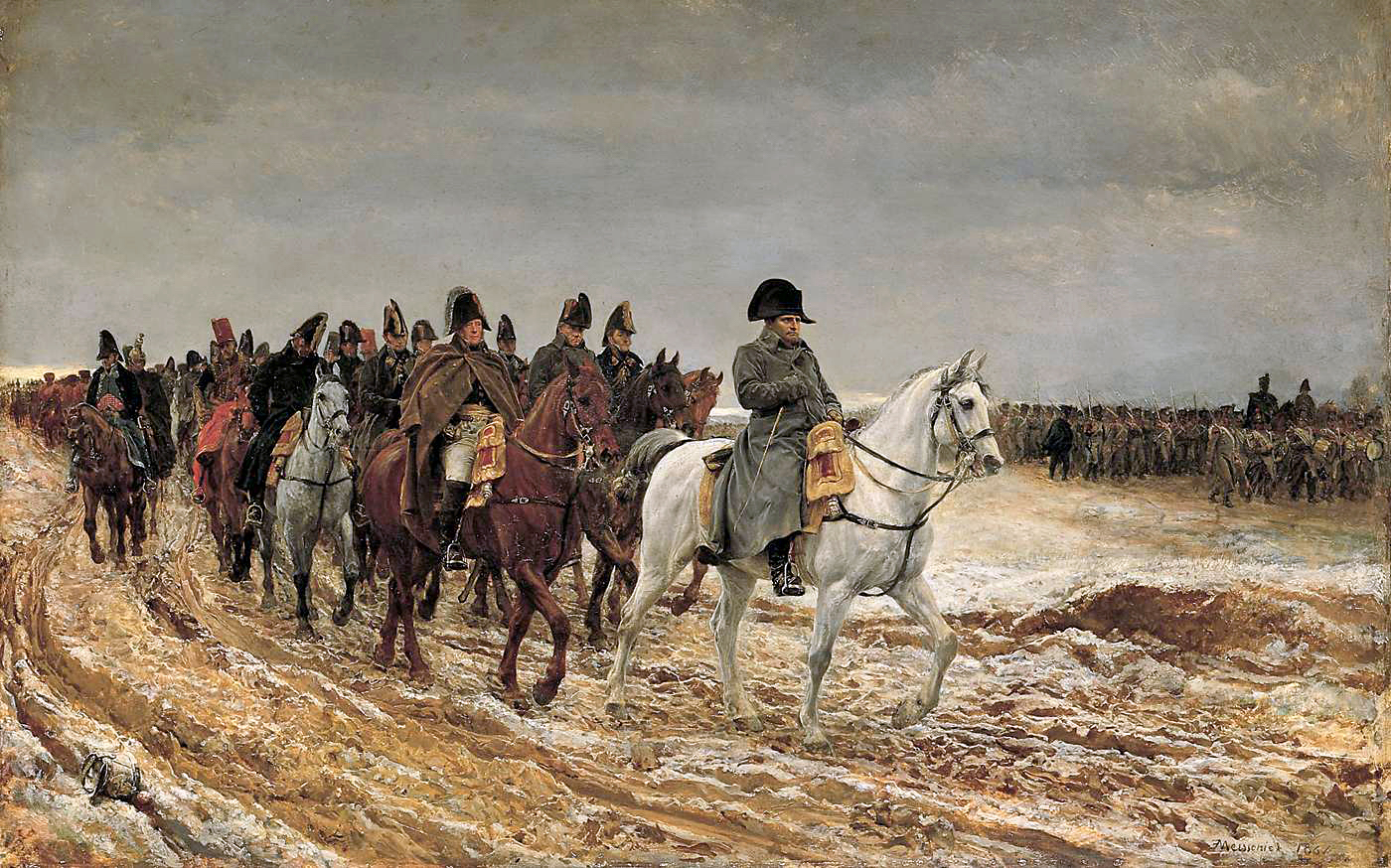
Napoleon in the 1814 campaign by Meissonier (1864). Trelliard's dragoon division was transferred to eastern France in early 1814.

On 21 June 1813 at the Battle of Vitoria, Trelliard commanded the 1,038 horsemen in his four French dragoon regiments as part of the Army of the Center. After Marshal Nicolas Soult reorganized the army in the late summer of 1813, he led a 2,358-strong cavalry division consisting of six regiments. During the Battle of the Pyrenees at the end of July, the division included the 4th, 14th, 16th, 17th, 21st, and 26th Dragoon Regiments. At the Battle of the Nive on 10 December 1813, Louis-Ernest-Joseph Sparre's dragoon brigade of his division overran the 1st Portuguese Line Infantry Regiment. Trelliard and his division were transferred to eastern France shortly after the battle.

Trelliard led his division in a French victory at the Battle of Mormant (sometimes called Nangis) on 17 February 1814. The 4th, 14th, and 16th Dragoon Regiments fought during the engagement. On 23 and 24 February there was a clash at Troyes where the 21st and 26th Dragoons of Auguste Jean Joseph Gilbert Amiel's cavalry brigade defeated 3,600 Austrians. Amiel's brigade was part of François Étienne de Kellermann's VI Cavalry Corps. Treillard led the 5th Cavalry Division in Kellermann's corps in the Battle of Bar-sur-Aube on 26 and 27 February. The 4th and 14th Dragoon Regiments were engaged. The 4th, 14th, 16th, 17th, and 27th Dragoon Regiments fought at the Battle of Arcis-sur-Aube on 20 and 21 March 1814, though Trelliard was not specifically mentioned in the account. All six regiments that served under Trelliard in July 1813 are listed as being in Nicolas François Roussel d'Hurbal's 6th Dragoon Division on 30 March at the Battle of Paris.

== Later career ==
He sided with Napoleon during the Hundred Days and was given command of Belle-Île-en-Mer near Quiberon on the Brittany peninsula. After the emperor's defeat, King Louis XVIII retired him from the army. He was briefly restored to favor after the July Revolution of 1830. Readmitted to the army reserves in 1831, he retired again shortly before his death the following year. On 14 May 1832, he died at Charonne, then a village, now a part of Paris. He is buried in Père Lachaise Cemetery in Paris. The name TREILLARD is etched on Column 11 of the Arc de Triomphe.
