= Nicolas-François Roussel d'Hurbal =

Viscount Nicolas-François Roussel d'Hurbal
- Born: September 7, 1763; Neufchâteau, Vosges
- Died: 25 March 1849 (aged 85) Paris, France
- Allegiance: Habsburg Monarchy; France
- Branch: Habsburg Imperial and Royal Army; French Army
- Service years: 1782–1815
- Rank: Generalmajor (Austria); Général de Division (France)
- Conflicts: French Revolutionary Wars; Napoleonic Wars
- Awards: Baron of the Empire (1813); Viscount (1822)
- Other work: Inspector General of Cavalry; Gentilhomme de la Chambre

Viscount Nicolas-François Roussel d'Hurbal (French pronunciation: [nikɔlɑ fʁɑ̃swa ʁusɛl dyʁbal]; 7 September 1763–25 March 1849), was a French soldier during the French Revolutionary Wars and Napoleonic Wars.

He spent the better part of his military career in the service of the Habsburg monarchy (1782–1811), fighting as a junior cavalry officer in the French Revolutionary Wars. In 1804, before the outbreak of the War of the Third Coalition, he saw promotion to Lieutenant-Colonel and in 1807 he was promoted to Colonel and given the command of a Cuirassier regiment. He led his regiment with distinction at the Battle of Aspern-Essling and won promotion to General-Major after the battle. Weeks later, he led a Cuirassier brigade at the Battle of Wagram. Retired in the Austrian army, he joined Napoleon in 1811, with the rank of Brigadier General. He took part to the French Invasion of Russia, serving in the I Cavalry Corps of the Grande Armée. By the end of 1812, he had gained promotion to General of Division. Later, he took part to the campaigns of the War of the Sixth Coalition and swore allegiance to Louis XVIII, after the Bourbon Restoration in 1814. After Napoleon's escape from exile and resurgence to power in France, Roussel d'Hurbal joined him again and was in command of a heavy cavalry division at the Battle of Waterloo. He was then retired from active service and given a position as inspector general for cavalry.

Roussel d'Hurbal was a recipient of the French Legion of Honour and the Austrian Military Order of Maria Theresa, a Baron of the Empire (from 1813) and a Viscount from 1822.

== Early career ==
Although he was born in Neufchâteau, Vosges, France, Roussel d'Hurbal joined the army of the Habsburg monarchy on 1 January 1782, as a cadet in the Kaunitz infantry regiment. He spent the next three years in the infantry branch of the army. Nevertheless, 8 February 1785 he was transferred to the cavalry branch, where he would spend the remained of his career. He was at first a part of the Vincent Chevaulegers regiment, holding the rank of Sublieutenant. On 13 October 1789, he became a First Lieutenant in the Latour Dragoons regiment, with whom he fought his first engagements of the French Revolutionary Wars. He was wounded by a bullet, while fighting the French at the Battle of Aldenhoven on 2 March 1793. During the next few years, Roussel d'Hurbal saw steady, albeit slow, promotion in the Habsburg Army. He was promoted to Second Captain on 20 April 1793, then to full Captain on 1 March 1797, to Major on 1 March 1802 and to lieutenant-colonel of the Latour Chevaulegers on 2 September 1804.

== Napoleonic Wars ==
Roussel d'Hurbal spent the better part of 1805 fighting against the French. However, by the end of the year, the Habsburgs were forced out of the War of the Third Coalition and into making separate peace with the French Empire, as a result of the defeat at Austerlitz. Austria stayed out of the 1806-1807 War of the Fourth Coalition, but during this period of peace, Roussel d'Hurbal saw his most important promotion yet, to the rank of colonel, in command of the Moritz Liechtenstein Cuirassiers (1 January 1807).

In early 1809, the Austrian Empire prepared a new war against the French Empire. Colonel Roussel d'Hurbal played a conspicuous part in the Austrian victory against Napoleon at Aspern-Essling. During the second day of battle, on 22 May 1809, the colonel received a sabre cut that pierced his helmet, but did not cause a sufficiently serious wound to prevent him from retaining command. One day after the battle, he was promoted to General-Major and was entrusted with the command of a powerful heavy cavalry brigade, around 1,000 sabres strong, composed of the 3rd Herzog Albert Cuirassiers and the 2nd Erzherzog Franz Cuirassiers. His brigade was heavily engaged against the French and their allies at the great Battle of Wagram on 5 and 6 July 1809, which saw the Austrian army decisively defeated by Napoleon's forces.

== In the service of France ==
General Rousel d'Hurbal resigned from his position in October 1810 and was retired on 1 April 1811. He immediately sought service in the French army and was admitted on 31 July 1811, with the rank of Brigadier General, a rank equivalent to that which he held in the Austrian army. As Napoleon was preparing for the imminent war with Russia, Roussel d'Hurbal was appointed inspector and commander of the 9th Chevau-Légers on 3 August 1811 and then commander of the 8th (Polish) Lancers on 1 May 1812. He then served as a general staff officer to the I Corps of the Grande Armée and on 1 June 1812 was sent to serve in the 4th foreign light cavalry brigade of General Bruyère's division. This unit became a part of Nansouty's I Cavalry Corps during the French Invasion of Russia. The unit fought at the Battle of Borodino (7 September 1812), where Roussel d'Hurbal had his left leg badly bruised by a cannonball. He was named General of Division, the top military rank in the French army, on 4 December 1812 and in February 1813, he was given the task of commanding a cavalry regiment formed from the debris of II Cavalry Corps. On 19 April, he was given the command of the newly formed 2nd light cavalry division of the Army of the Elbe. He was noted for his actions at the Battle of Katzbach on 26 August 1813, where he received a serious sabre wound at the head. He was no longer able to assume immediate active duties and was allowed to go on sick leave. A month later, he was gratified with the title Baron of the Empire, a sign of Imperial appreciation for his services (28 September 1813).

He spent the next few months on sick leave and it wasn't until the beginning of 1814 that he was given another position, as inspector general of the central cavalry depot at Versailles (17 January 1814). One month later, on 11 February, he was appointed commander of the Fontainebleau sector. A few days later, he was given his first field command in months, when he was appointed at the head of the 6th cavalry division, a unit entirely composed of Dragoons and integrated in the VI Cavalry Corps (19 February). On 23 February, his division was detached to II Corps. He led his division in a remarkable charge against the Russians at Craonne and subsequently saw action in several engagements of the campaign. On 5 April, Roussel d'Hurbal led his division to Évreux, a move that was a part of Marshal Auguste de Marmont's defection, which virtually surrendered Paris to the Sixth Coalition.

== Bourbon Restoration and beyond ==
With the Bourbon Restoration, Roussel d'Hurbal was given the position of inspector general, with the mission of reorganising the cavalry in the 6th and 19th military divisions (1 June 1814). At the end of the year, on 30 December 1814, he was appointed inspector general for cavalry. On 11 March 1815, following the news of Napoleon's unexpected return from his exile on the island of Elba, Roussel d'Hurbal, who was well-trusted by the Bourbons, received orders to travel to Lyon. There, he was to make himself available for service under the orders of the Comte d'Artois. The plan to stop Napoleon's advance to Paris failed and the Emperor entered Paris unopposed and reclaimed power on 20 March. Roussel d'Hurbal joined him and on 8 April, he was named commander of the 2nd reserve cavalry division, based at Metz. On 3 June, he was given command of the 12th heavy cavalry division of Kellermann's III Cavalry Corps. His division was in the thick of the fighting on 18 June at the Battle of Waterloo, where the general was wounded. Later, he took provisional command of the entire III Cavalry Corps, in replacement of Kellermann. He was placed on the non-active list on 1 August and retired on 9 September. After the second Bourbon Restoration, Roussel d'Hurbal seemed to retain some favour at the Court, subsequently receiving another appointment as inspector general and the title of Gentilhomme of the King's Chamber. In 1822, he was also gratified with the title of Viscount.

== Recognition ==
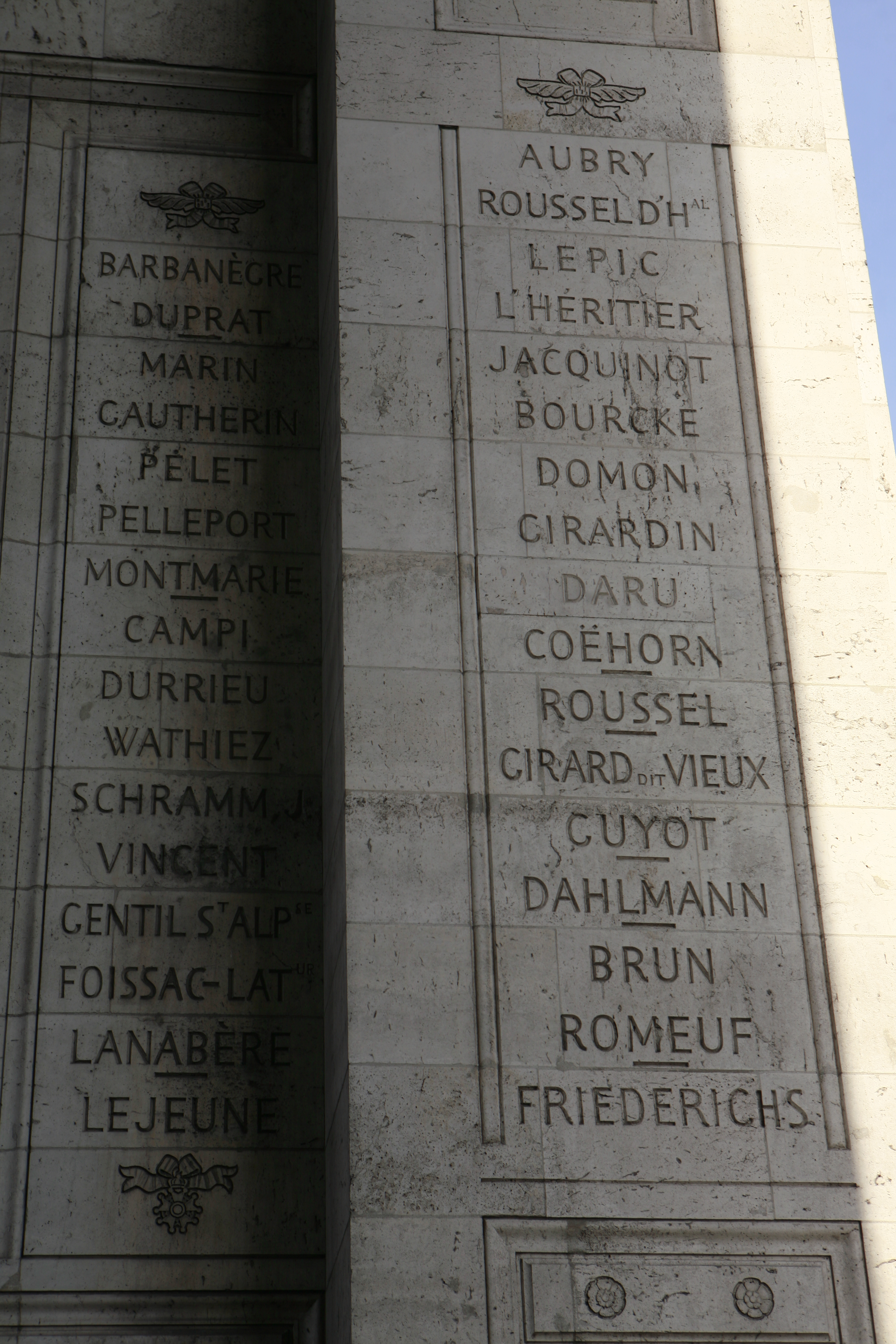
Roussel d'Hurbal's name appears (as "ROUSSEL D'H^{AL}", second from top in the right-hand column) on the eastern pillar of the Arc de Triomphe

General Roussel d'Hurbal held the titles of Baron of the Empire and later Viscount. He was a recipient of the Legion of Honour and his name appears on the Arc de Triomphe in Paris.

== Sources ==
- Castle, Ian: Aspern and Wagram 1809, Chandler, David G (General Editor), Campaign Series 33, Osprey Military, 1994, ISBN 1-85532-366-4
- Fierro, Alfredo; Palluel-Guillard, André; Tulard, Jean - "Histoire et Dictionnaire du Consulat et de l'Empire”, Éditions Robert Laffont, ISBN 2-221-05858-5.
- Lapray, Olivier - "Dictionnaire des officiers de Cuirassiers du Premier Empire", Histoire & Collections, 2008, ISBN 978-2-35250-025-4
