= III Cavalry Corps (Grande Armée) =

Military unit of Grande Armée

- Active: 1812–1814
- Country: First French Empire
- Branch: French Imperial Army
- Type: Shock cavalry
- Size: Corps
- Engagements: Russian campaign War of the Sixth Coalition

Commanders
- Notable commanders: Jean-Toussaint Arrighi de Casanova; Emmanuel de Grouchy; François Étienne de Kellermann

The III Cavalry Corps of the Grande Armée was a French military unit that existed during the Napoleonic Wars. The corps was created in 1812 and reconstituted in 1813 and 1815. Emperor Napoleon Bonaparte first mobilized the corps for the invasion of Russia. Commanded by General Emmanuel de Grouchy, two divisions of the corps fought at Borodino, Tarutino, and Vyazma. A third division fought at the First and Second battles of Polotsk and the Berezina. During the War of the Sixth Coalition in 1813, General Jean-Toussaint Arrighi de Casanova led the corps at Großbeeren, Dennewitz, Leipzig, and Hanau.

== History ==
=== 1812 ===
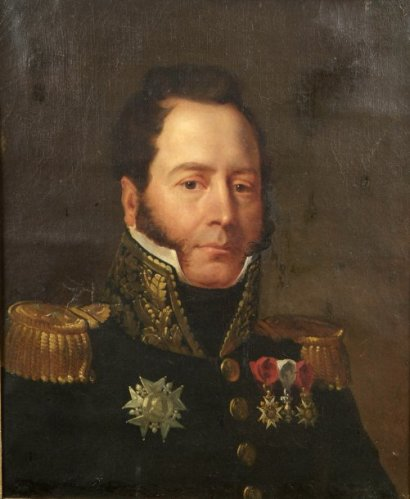
Armand de La Houssaye

The III Cavalry Corps was first constituted for the invasion of Russia and placed under the command of General Emmanuel de Grouchy. On 24 June 1812, the corps numbered 9,676 men in 50 squadrons and was supported by 30 horse artillery pieces. There were three divisions under Generals Louis Pierre Aimé Chastel, Jean-Pierre Doumerc, and Armand Lebrun de La Houssaye. Chastel led the 3rd Light Cavalry Division, Doumerc directed the 3rd Heavy Cavalry Division, and Houssaye commanded the 6th Heavy Cavalry Division. The Grande Armée captured Vilnius and Napoleon entered the city on 28 June. Four days later, a freak storm with freezing rain blew all night long, causing the deaths of thousands of horses. Colonel Lubin Griois of Grouchy's corps artillery claimed that the storm killed one-fourth of his horses. Soon after, Grouchy was directed to place his cavalry under Marshal Louis-Nicolas Davout in attempt to cut off General Pyotr Bagration's Russian Second Army. Though Davout reached Minsk ahead of Bagration, the Russians were able to slip out of the trap because King Jérôme Bonaparte failed to pursue with energy.

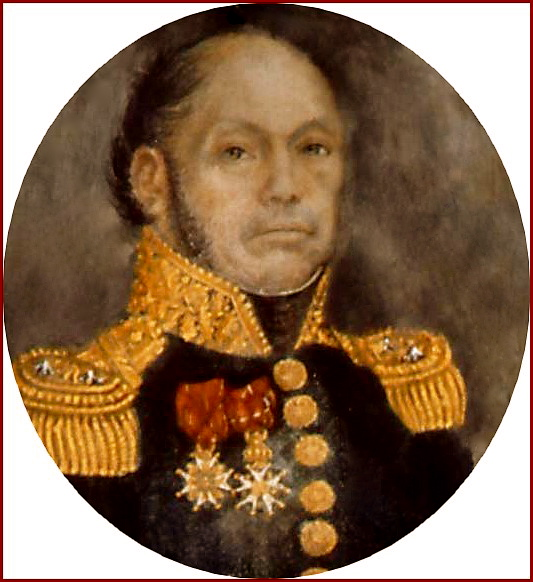
Jean-Pierre Doumerc

Doumerc's 3rd Heavy Cavalry Division was detached from the corps to operate on the northern front where it was in action at the First Battle of Polotsk from 16 to 18 August 1812. Engaged in the action were the 4th and 7th Cuirassier Regiments, each with four squadrons. During the battle, a Russian attack led by some Russian Guard cavalry squadrons pierced the French lines. General Laurent Gouvion Saint-Cyr personally ordered the 3rd Swiss Regiment to attack while General Frédéric de Berckheim led the 4th Cuirassiers in a cavalry charge. These thrusts turned back the Russian assault. Three cuirassier regiments from Doumerc's division fought in the Second Battle of Polotsk from 18 to 20 October.

Meanwhile, the two main armies fought at the Battle of Borodino on 7 September 1812. At Borodino, Grouchy's corps included the divisions of Chastel and Houssaye. In the final successful French attack on the Great Redoubt, Grouchy's III Cavalry Corps was to the left, Prince Eugène de Beauharnais' IV Corps was in the center, and the II and IV Cavalry Corps were on the right. While the right flank cavalry and infantry overran the fortification, Grouchy's cavalry galloped into the area behind the Great Redoubt only to find that there was a second line of Russian infantry deployed in squares 800 metres (875 yd) to the east. A Russian cavalry countercharge was blunted but the French were unable to advance beyond the captured redoubt. Houssaye was badly wounded at Borodino and became a Russian prisoner when the hospitals at Vilnius were abandoned on 10 December. Units of the corps were engaged at the Battle of Tarutino on 18 October. These were the French 6th Chasseurs-à-Cheval, 6th Hussar, and 23rd Dragoon Regiment and the Württemberger 3rd Jäger zu Pferde Regiment. By this time, battle losses and illness had shrunk Grouchy's corps to only 700 mounted men.

The 7th and 30th Dragoon Regiments from the 6th Heavy Cavalry Division were engaged at the Battle of Vyazma on 3 November 1812. Doumerc's division joined the remnants of the main army in time to fight at the Battle of Berezina. From 26 to 28 November, Napoleon's retreating army streamed across the ice-choked Berezina River on makeshift bridges. On the 28th, a force of 30,000 Russians tried to advance up the west bank to cut Napoleon's line of retreat but was stopped in a desperate struggle by 14,000 French troops. During the struggle, Marshal Michel Ney ordered Doumerc's cuirassiers to charge. The heavy cavalrymen hurled back the Russians, capturing 2,000 men. The III Cavalry Corps units involved were the 4th, 7th, and 14th Cuirassier Regiments. Casualties were horrific during the retreat and included General Denis Étienne Seron who vanished without a trace in November. In February 1812, the 8th Chasseurs-à-Cheval of Chastel's division left Italy 800 strong and a year later there were only 75 survivors. In 1813, Napoleon managed to fill the ranks of his infantry by conscripting under-aged youths and his arsenals were able to cast more cannons to replace the one thousand guns that were lost. But the loss of over 200,000 horses and trained horsemen in Russia crippled his ability to field an effective cavalry arm in the next campaign.

=== 1813–1814 ===
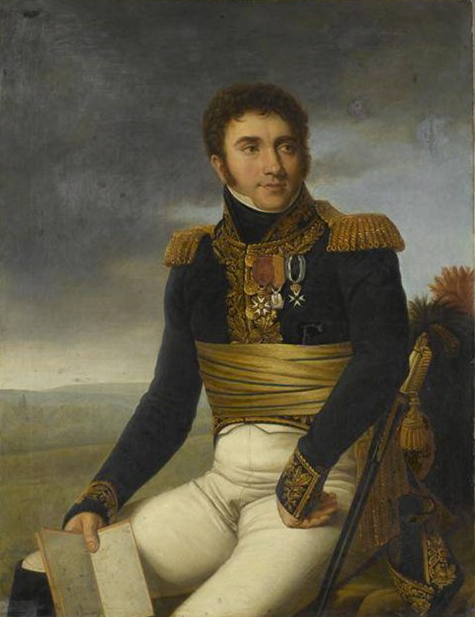
Jean-Marie Defrance

After the disaster in Russia, Napoleon was determined to recreate four bodies of cavalry for his army in Germany. These were the Imperial Guard cavalry, the I Cavalry Corps under General Victor de Fay de La Tour-Maubourg, the II Cavalry Corps under General Horace François Bastien Sébastiani, and the III Cavalry Corps under General Jean-Toussaint Arrighi de Casanova. The last formation was to be created by taking one squadron from each cavalry regiment serving in Spain. On 1 May, the III Cavalry Corps was located at Hanau with 3,895 men present and fit for duty. On 15 April, the II Cavalry Corps counted 149 officers, 3,144 men, and 3,581 horses. At the end of April, the I Cavalry Corps had 172 officers, 3,343 men, and 3,705 horses along the Elbe River. On 15 May, the I Cavalry Corps in Napoleon's main army numbered 9,800 troopers in 45 to 50 squadrons. That same day, the II Cavalry Corps in Ney's army counted 3,000 horsemen in 15 squadrons. But the III Cavalry Corps is not otherwise mentioned in the spring campaign.

When the summer armistice ended, Napoleon had amassed 400,000 infantry in 559 battalions, almost 40,000 cavalry in 400 squadrons, and 1,284 artillery pieces. Though the French artillery was superior to their opponents, the cavalry was poorly trained. Napoleon's army in Germany was split into two major groups. While Napoleon led the bulk of the army, Marshal Nicolas Oudinot commanded a northern group consisting of the IV Corps, VII Corps, and XII Corps, plus the III Cavalry Corps under Arrighi. Oudinot had orders to march upon Berlin. At this time, Arrighi's corps numbered about 6,000 horsemen in 27 squadrons supported by 24 artillery pieces. Arrighi's three divisions were led by Generals Jean-Marie Defrance, Jean Thomas Guillaume Lorge, and François Fournier-Sarlovèze. Defrance led the 4th Heavy Cavalry Division, Lorge commanded the 5th Light Cavalry Division, and Fournier directed the 6th Light Cavalry Division. Oudinot's army of 67,000 men and 216 guns was to be supported by Marshal Louis-Nicolas Davout and 37,500 men with 94 guns from Hamburg, plus smaller forces.

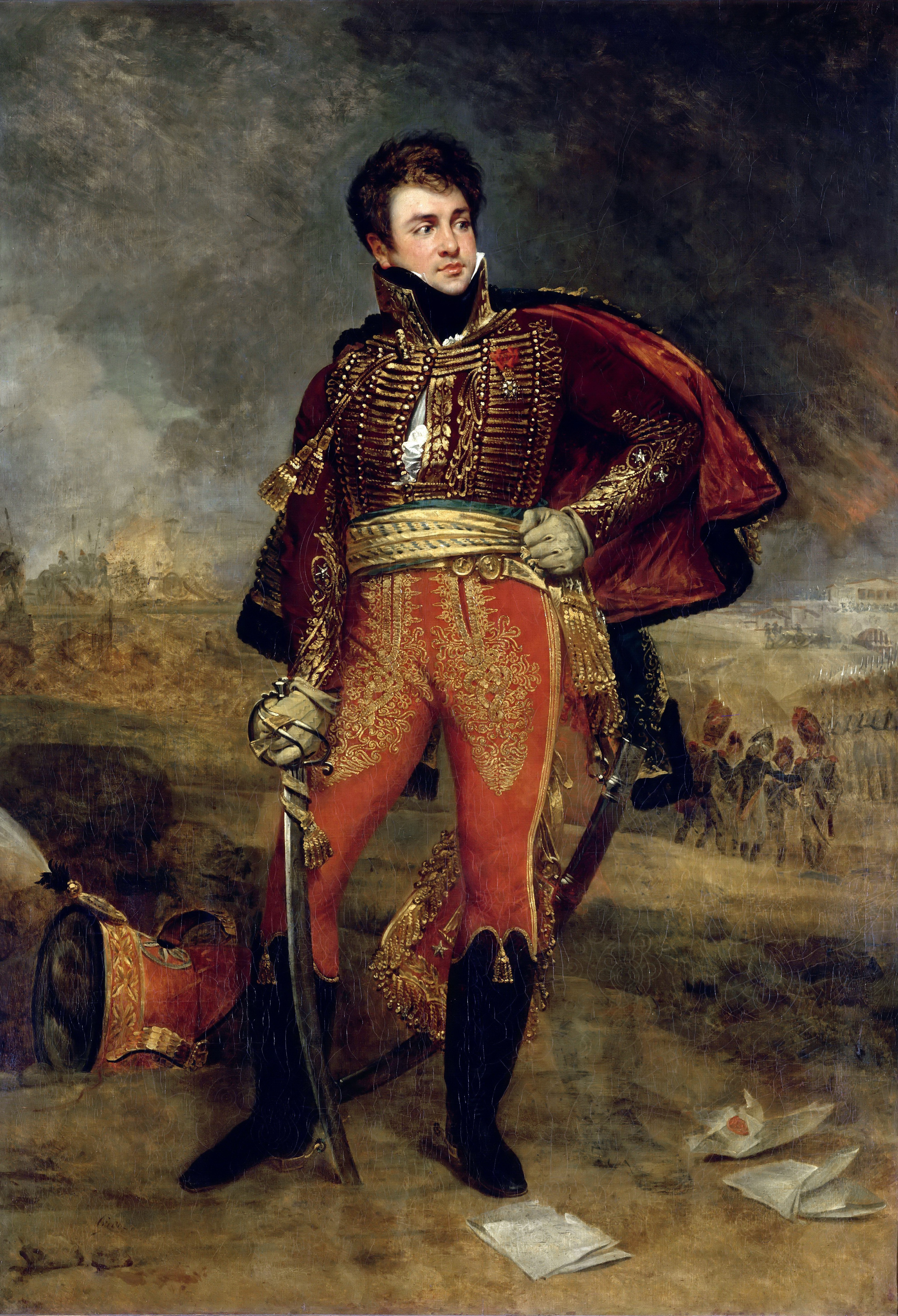
François Fournier-Sarlovèze

On 23 August 1813, the three divisions of the III Cavalry Corps were split among several formations as Oudinot's army advanced through broken terrain. Fournier accompanied the XII Corps on the left flank, Defrance marched with the IV Corps on the right flank, while Lorge was held back with two infantry divisions to guard the rear. On the right flank, the IV Corps skirmished with General Bogislav Friedrich Emanuel von Tauentzien's 13,000 Prussians and 32 guns. At 2:00 PM, the IV Corps abruptly pulled back. In the center, the 27,000-strong VII Corps occupied a feature called the Windmill Height and went into camp around 3:00 PM. General Friedrich Wilhelm Freiherr von Bülow's 38,000-man Prussian corps soon arrived and a 90-minute artillery bombardment ensued. Bülow finally advanced and drove the VII Corps out of its positions after some stiff fighting. At 8:00 PM, Fournier came upon the battlefield and soon a melee was raging between his division and the Prussian hussars. Seeing that his foot soldiers were helpless in a cavalry combat, Bülow withdrew most of his troops. However, that night Oudinot conceded the Battle of Großbeeren to the Prussians when he ordered his army to retreat. For a loss of 1,000 casualties, the Prussians inflicted losses of 3,000 men and 13 guns on the French and Saxons.

Napoleon was livid at Oudinot's poor showing and demoted him to the leadership of the XII Corps. Ney, now the new army commander, was ordered to march east from Wittenberg to Baruth south of Berlin. Ney assumed command on 3 September and put his 58,000-man army in motion on the 5th. That day there was a sharp fight at Zahna in which Oudinot's corps drove Tauentzien's troops out of the town. As at Großbeeren, the III Cavalry Corps was distributed among the different units of the army. Fournier accompanied XII Corps and Lorge marched with IV Corps. The Battle of Dennewitz began at 11:00 AM on 6 September when a IV Corps infantry division, supported by Lorge and a second infantry division, attacked Tauentzien north of Dennewitz. At first the French were successful but the arrival of Bülow's corps from the west forced back Lorge and the IV Corps. The VII Corps came on the field at 1:00 PM and became involved in a see-saw combat at the village of Golsdorf on the left flank. The XII Corps belatedly arrived on the left flank starting at 3:00 PM. Just as the French began gaining ground on the left, Ney ordered the XII Corps to the right to support the badly shaken IV Corps. Though he could see it was a mistake, Oudinot obeyed the letter of his orders and marched off. Bülow, now supported by Swedish and Russian reinforcements, renewed his attack and broke through. The VII Corps might have been totally destroyed but for a "timely charge" by Defrance's cuirassiers. Even so, the battle was a disaster for the French whose flight also carried away the barely-engaged XII Corps. Ney lost 22,000 men, mostly prisoners, and 53 guns. Allied casualties at Zahna, Dennewitz, and the pursuit amounted to 10,500, almost all of them Prussian.

In subsequent operations, Lorge's division was detached from its parent corps. While Arrighi's corps continued to operate with Ney's northern army, by 27 September 1813 Lorge was guarding the rear of Napoleon's armies. A few days later, Lorge had 1,500 troopers and 6 guns near Leipzig while Arrighi's other two divisions counted 2,500 horsemen and six artillery pieces. About this time, Arrighi was appointed governor of Leipzig, but it is not stated who commanded the corps. At the Battle of Leipzig on 16 October, Lorge was held back to guard Leipzig, Fournier was with the III Corps, Defrance was with the VII Corps except General Jean Charles Quinette de Cernay whose brigade was with the IV Corps. On the 17th, the divisions of Fournier and Lorge were driven back by Russian cavalry, losing 500 casualties and 5 guns. When the Saxons defected from Napoleon's army on 18 October, the troopers of Defrance's nearby division cheered them, believing that their allies were launching an attack. At 4:00 PM, the I, III, and V Cavalry Corps were withdrawn from the battlefield.

The 5th Dragoon Regiment of Defrance's division was engaged at the Battle of Hanau on 30–31 October 1813. On 23 November, Arrighi's III Corps was stationed at Bonn on the Rhine River, with its left wing at Cologne and its right wing at Koblenz. By 1 December, the corps was shifted northward so that it guarded the Rhine between Wesel and Andernach. Historian Digby Smith's catalog of Napoleonic War battles does not list the corps in any major actions during 1814. However, the III Cavalry Corps under Arrighi and the IV Cavalry Corps under Sébastiani served in Marshal Jacques MacDonald's command during the first week of February 1814. After being defeated at Chouilly on the 6th, Arrighi's corps numbered no more than 500 sabers.

== Orders of battle ==
=== Borodino, 1812 ===
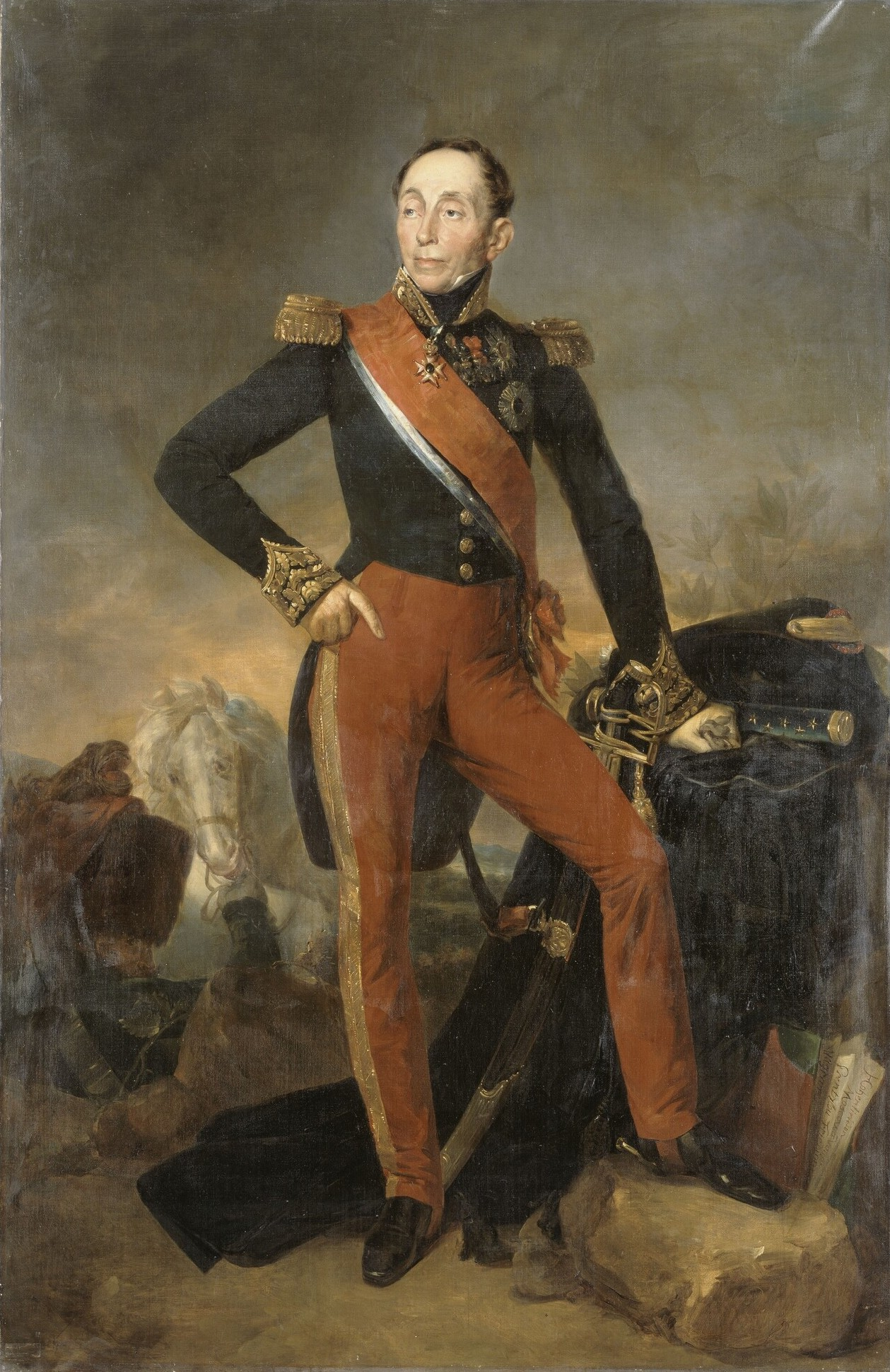
Emmanuel de Grouchy

III Cavalry Corps: General of Division Emmanuel de Grouchy

- 3rd Light Cavalry Division: General of Division Louis Pierre Aimé Chastel
  - Light Cavalry Brigade: General of Brigade Pierre Edme Gauthrin
    - 6th Hussar Regiment (3 squadrons)
    - 8th Chasseurs-à-Cheval Regiment (4 squadrons)
  - Light Cavalry Brigade: General of Brigade François Joseph Gerard
    - 6th Chasseurs-à-Cheval Regiment (3 squadrons)
    - 25th Chasseurs-à-Cheval Regiment (3 squadrons)
  - Light Cavalry Brigade: General of Brigade Jean-Baptiste Dommanget
    - 1st Bavarian Chevau-léger Regiment (4 squadrons)
    - 2nd Bavarian Chevau-léger Regiment (4 squadrons)
    - Prinz Albrecht Saxon Chevau-léger Regiment (4 squadrons)
- 6th Heavy Cavalry Division: General of Division Armand Lebrun de La Houssaye
  - Heavy Cavalry Brigade: General of Brigade Nicolas Marin Thiry
    - 7th Dragoon Regiment (3 squadrons)
    - 23rd Dragoon Regiment (3 squadrons)
  - Heavy Cavalry Brigade: General of Brigade Denis Étienne Seron
    - 28th Dragoon Regiment (3 squadrons)
    - 30th Dragoon Regiment (3 squadrons)
- Corps Artillery:
  - 4th Company/1st Horse Artillery Regiment (6 guns)
  - 4th Company/6th Horse Artillery Regiment (6 guns)
  - 5th Company/6th Horse Artillery Regiment (6 guns)

Source: Smith, Digby (1998). The Napoleonic Wars Data Book. London: Greenhill. p. 391. ISBN 1-85367-276-9.
Source: "Order of Battle of Borodino". napolun.com. 2007.

=== Leipzig, 1813 ===
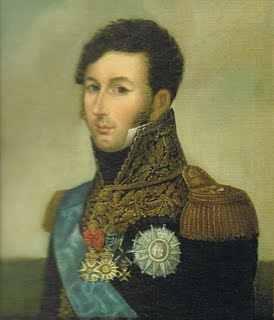
Jean-Toussaint Arrighi

III Cavalry Corps: General of Division Jean-Toussaint Arrighi de Casanova (4,000)

- 4th Heavy Cavalry Division: General of Division Jean-Marie Defrance
  - Horse Artillery: (1/2 battery)
  - 1st Brigade: General of Brigade Jacques Philippe Avice
    - 4th Dragoon Regiment (1 squadron)
    - 5th Dragoon Regiment (1 squadron)
    - 12th Dragoon Regiment (1 squadron)
    - 14th Dragoon Regiment (1 squadron)
  - 2nd Brigade: General of Brigade Jean Charles Quinette de Cernay
    - 16th Dragoon Regiment (1 squadron)
    - 17th Dragoon Regiment (1 squadron)
    - 21st Dragoon Regiment (1 squadron)
    - 26th Dragoon Regiment (1 squadron)
    - 27th Dragoon Regiment (1 squadron)
    - 13th Cuirassier Regiment (1 squadron)
- 5th Light Cavalry Division: General of Division Jean Thomas Guillaume Lorge
  - Horse Artillery: (1/2 battery)
  - 12th Light Cavalry Brigade: General of Brigade Charles Claude Jacquinot
    - 5th Chasseurs-à-Cheval Regiment (2 squadrons)
    - 10th Chasseurs-à-Cheval Regiment (2 squadrons)
    - 13th Chasseurs-à-Cheval Regiment (2 squadrons)
  - 13th Light Cavalry Brigade: General of Brigade Jean Baptiste Gabriel Merlin
    - 15th Chasseurs-à-Cheval Regiment (1 squadron)
    - 21st Chasseurs-à-Cheval Regiment (1 squadron)
    - 22nd Chasseurs-à-Cheval Regiment (2 squadrons)
- 6th Light Cavalry Division: General of Division François Fournier-Sarlovèze
  - Horse Artillery: (1/2 battery)
  - 9th Light Cavalry Brigade: General of Brigade Pierre Mourier
    - 29th Chasseurs-à-Cheval Regiment (1 squadron)
    - 31st Chasseurs-à-Cheval Regiment (1 squadron)
    - 1st Hussar Regiment (1 squadron)
  - 10th Light Cavalry Brigade: General of Brigade Auguste Jean Ameil
    - 2nd Hussar Regiment (1 squadron)
    - 4th Hussar Regiment (1 squadron)
    - 12th Hussar Regiment (1 squadron)

Source: Smith, Digby (1998). The Napoleonic Wars Data Book. London: Greenhill. pp. 462–463. ISBN 1-85367-276-9.
