= François Christophe Edmond de Kellermann =

French politician (1802–1868)

François Christophe Edmond de Kellermann, 3rd Duke of Valmy (1802-1868) was a statesman, political historian, and diplomat under the July Monarchy.

He was the son of François Étienne de Kellermann and the grandson of marshal François Christophe de Kellermann. Elected to the Chamber of Deputies in 1842, he retired from politics in 1848. With his death the title became extinct.

== Work ==
- De la force du droit et du droit de la force (1850)
- Histoire de la campagne de 1800 (1854, written using his father's papers)
- Le génie des peuples dans les arts (1867)
