= II Cavalry Corps (Grande Armée) =

- Active: 1806–1807; 1812–1814
- Country: First French Empire
- Branch: French Imperial Army
- Type: Shock cavalry
- Size: Corps
- Engagements: War of the Fourth Coalition; Russian campaign War of the Sixth Coalition

Commanders
- Notable commanders: Jean-Baptiste Bessières; Rémi Joseph Isidore Exelmans; Louis-Pierre Montbrun; Antoine Decrest de Saint-Germain; Horace François Sébastiani

The II Cavalry Corps of the Grande Armée was a French military unit that existed during the Napoleonic Wars. It was first formed in December 1806, but only enjoyed a brief existence under Marshal Jean-Baptiste Bessières. The II Cavalry Corps was reconstituted for the invasion of Russia in 1812 and commanded by General Louis-Pierre Montbrun who was killed in battle, as was his successor a few hours later. During the War of the Sixth Coalition, General Horace François Bastien Sébastiani de La Porta led the II Cavalry Corps in 1813, while General Antoine-Louis Decrest de Saint-Germain led the corps in 1814. During the Hundred Days, Emperor Napoleon Bonaparte raised the corps again and entrusted it to General Rémi Joseph Isidore Exelmans.

== History ==
=== 1806-1807 ===
The II Cavalry Corps was formed on 16 December 1806 at the beginning of Napoleon's campaign in Poland. Placed under the command of Marshal Jean-Baptiste Bessières, it operated with the northern wing of the French corps that advanced across the Vistula. The remainder of the army's reserve cavalry formed the I Cavalry Corps under Marshal Joachim Murat. The II Cavalry Corps included the 2nd Dragoon Division under General Emmanuel de Grouchy, the 4th Dragoon Division led by General Louis Michel Antoine Sahuc, the 2nd Cuirassier Division commanded by General Jean-Joseph Ange d'Hautpoul, and the light cavalry division of General Jacques Louis François Delaistre de Tilly. The corps was dissolved on 12 January 1807. The only notable action occurred at Bieżuń on 23 December 1806. After Grouchy's division seized Bieżuń on 19 December, the Prussian commander, General Anton Wilhelm von L'Estocq, sent Major Karl Anton Stephan de La Roche-Aymon and several units to recover the town. Upon arrival, the Prussians found that the French cavalry had been reinforced by infantry and artillery. Grouchy immediately attacked and drove La Roche-Aymon toward Soldau (Działdowo). The French dragoons crowded a portion of the Prussian force against a swampy forest and forced the surrender of 500 men and 5 artillery pieces.

=== 1812-1814 ===
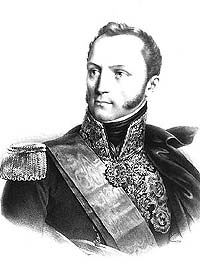
Auguste Caulaincourt

The corps was reformed in 1812 for the invasion of Russia. Commanded by General Louis-Pierre Montbrun, the initial strength of the corps was 10,436 cavalry and 30 horse artillery pieces. General Horace François Bastien Sébastiani de La Porta led the 2nd Light Cavalry Division, General Pierre Watier directed the 2nd Heavy Cavalry Division, and General Jean-Marie Defrance commanded the 4th Heavy Cavalry Division.

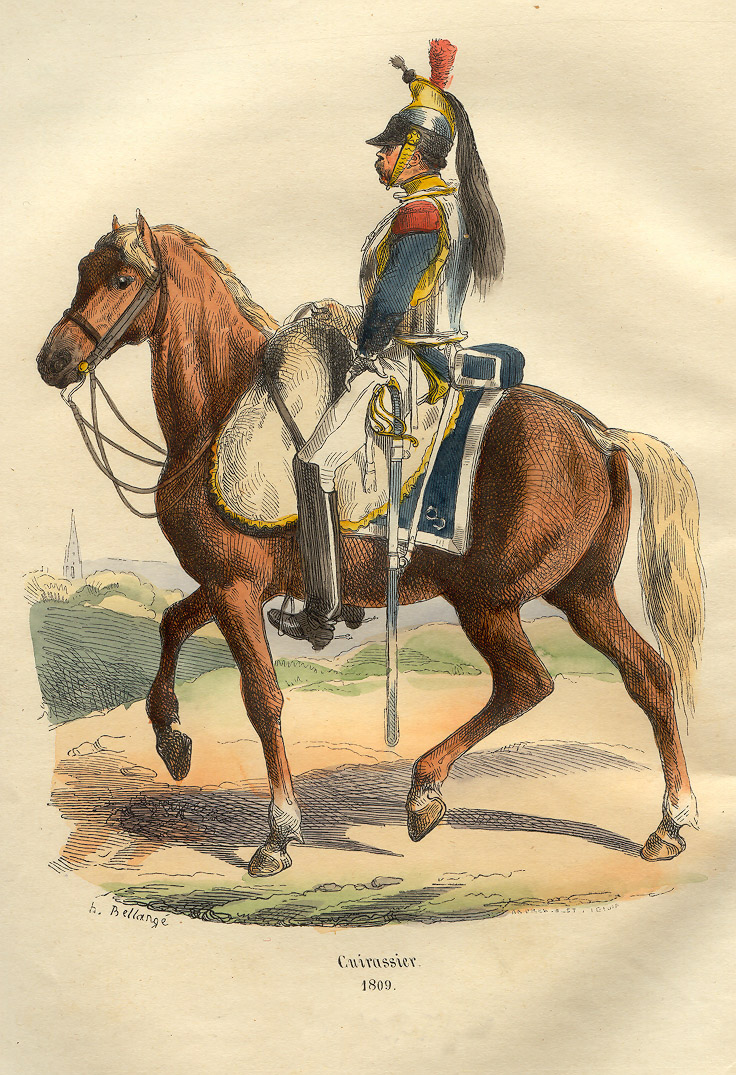
The heavy cavalry divisions included cuirassiers, as shown here.

The corps was heavily engaged at the Battle of Borodino on 7 September 1812. Early in the morning, the corps was moved up from reserve in support of Marshal Michel Ney's III Corps attacks on the flèches, during which Montbrun was killed. Around 3:00 PM, the IV Corps under Viceroy Eugène de Beauharnais mounted a frontal assault on the Great Redoubt. The II Cavalry Corps, now led by General Auguste-Jean-Gabriel de Caulaincourt charged the Russian infantry lines to the south of the position. Breaking through, the cavalry wheeled to the left and galloped into the open back of the Great Redoubt just as Eugène's infantry fought their way in from the front. The four Russian infantry regiments defending the redoubt were annihilated. During the melee, Caulaincourt was slain while leading the 5th Cuirassier Regiment.

After the disaster in Russia, Napoleon ordered four bodies of cavalry to be rebuilt for his army in Germany. These were the Imperial Guard cavalry, the I Cavalry Corps led by General Victor de Fay de La Tour-Maubourg, the II Cavalry Corps under Sébastiani, and the III Cavalry Corps under General Jean-Toussaint Arrighi de Casanova. The I and II Corps were to have three heavy and four light cavalry divisions. On April 15, the II Cavalry Corps numbered 149 officers, 3,144 troopers, and 3,581 horses. By the end of April, the I Cavalry Corps had 172 officers, 3,343 men, and 3,705 horses deployed along the Elbe River. The lack of trained horses and cavalrymen proved to be a major factor for the French defeat in 1813. On 15 May, the size of the I Cavalry Corps had been raised to 9,800 troopers in 45 to 50 squadrons. That same day, the II Cavalry Corps in Ney's army numbered 3,000 horsemen in 15 squadrons. At the battles of Lützen and Bautzen Napoleon only employed the I Cavalry Corps. The II Cavalry Corps and the II Corps missed Bautzen because Napoleon was dazzled by the possibility of capturing Berlin. Belatedly, the emperor realized that the Allies were offering battle at Bautzen and giving him an opportunity to smash them. But his orders to Ney were too late for the two corps to arrive in time.

After the summer armistice, the II Cavalry Corps numbered 10,304 men in 52 squadrons, supported by 18 guns. The corps fought in the Battle of the Katzbach on 26 August 1813 under the overall command of Marshal Jacques MacDonald. As the French crossed the Katzbach River, the cavalry became intermixed with the infantry, slowing down the advance. Early in the action, the II Cavalry Corps was driven off by Russian cavalry. The French infantry tried to hold off the charging Prussian and Russian horsemen but were unable to fire their muskets due to the heavy rain. When the Allied infantry advanced with bayonets and clubbed muskets, the French were routed. Fleeing down to the river bank the French foot soldiers found that the stream was now swollen by the rain and difficult to cross. Thousands were captured. A few days later, Napoleon hurled abuse at Sébastiani for mishandling the cavalry, though the unfortunate general was allowed to remain in command.

At the Battle of Leipzig on 16 to 19 October 1813, General Antoine-Louis Decrest de Saint-Germain led the 2nd Heavy Cavalry Division, General Nicolas François Roussel d'Hurbal commanded the 2nd Light Cavalry Division, and General Rémi Joseph Isidore Exelmans directed the 4th Light Cavalry Division. Altogether, the corps numbered 5,680 troopers and 12 guns. On the 16th, the corps was attached to MacDonald's XI Corps in its attempt to turn the Allied right flank. Around noon, the assault began and MacDonald drove back General Johann von Klenau's Austrian forces. At this time, Sébastiani's advance was held up by a Russian cavalry corps led by General Peter von der Pahlen at the village of Klein Possna. Ultimately, Napoleon failed to smash the Allies that day and suffered the loss of Germany as a result of his defeat at Leipzig. The II Cavalry Corps played a key role at the Battle of Hanau on 30 October. Together with the Imperial Guard Cavalry, they smashed the Bavarian left flank.

Saint-Germain commanded the II Cavalry Corps at the Battle of Vauchamps on 14 February 1814. It consisted of the 2nd Heavy Cavalry Division, also led by Saint-Germain, the 2nd Light Cavalry Division under General Sigismond Frédéric de Berckheim, and two horse artillery batteries. Saint-Germain led the 2,600-strong corps at the Battle of Laubressel on 3 and 4 March. General Antoine Maurin led the 2nd Light Cavalry Division.

== Order of battle ==
=== December 1806 ===
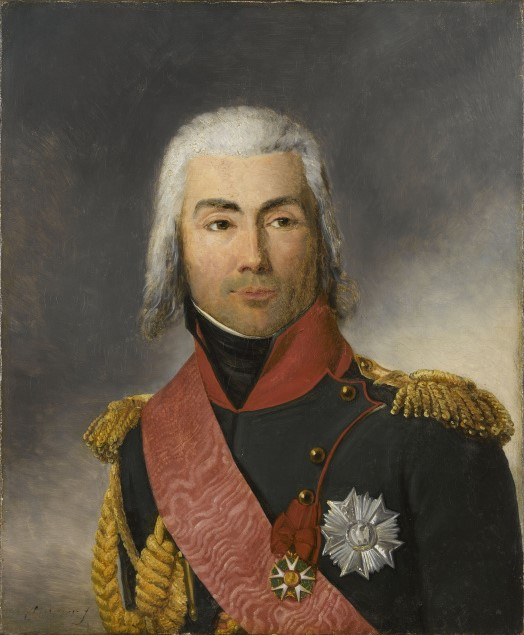
Jean-Baptiste Bessières

The following organizations and unit strengths are from October 1806.
Marshal Jean-Baptiste Bessières

- 2nd Cuirassier Division: General of Division Jean-Joseph Ange d'Hautpoul (1,927, 3 guns)
  - Brigade: General of Brigade Jean Verdière
    - 1st Cuirassier Regiment, 1st, 2nd, 3rd, and 4th squadrons
    - 5th Cuirassier Regiment, 1st, 2nd, 3rd, and 4th squadrons
  - Brigade: General of Brigade Raymond-Gaspard de Bonardi de Saint-Sulpice
    - 10th Cuirassier Regiment, 1st, 2nd, 3rd, and 4th squadrons
  - Artillery: 2nd Horse Artillery, 4th company (-), two 6-pound guns, one 6-inch howitzer
- 2nd Dragoon Division: General of Division Emmanuel de Grouchy (2,915, 3 guns)
  - Brigade: General of Brigade Mansuy Roget
    - 3rd Dragoon Regiment, 1st, 2nd, and 3rd squadrons
    - 4th Dragoon Regiment, 1st, 2nd, and 3rd squadrons
  - Brigade: General of Brigade Jacques Milet
    - 10th Dragoon Regiment, 1st, 2nd, and 3rd squadrons
    - 11th Dragoon Regiment, 1st, 2nd, and 3rd squadrons
  - Brigade: General of Brigade André Joseph Boussart
    - 13th Dragoon Regiment, 1st, 2nd, and 3rd squadrons
    - 22nd Dragoon Regiment, 1st, 2nd, and 3rd squadrons
  - Artillery: 2nd Horse Artillery, 2nd company (-), two 8-pound guns, one 6-inch howitzer

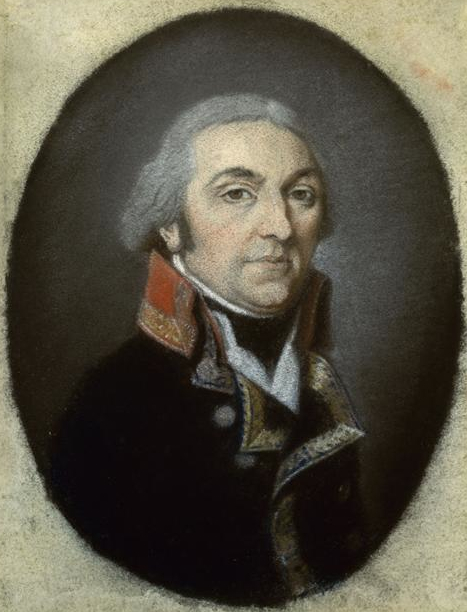
Louis Sahuc

- 4th Dragoon Division: General of Division Louis Michel Antoine Sahuc (3,129, 3 guns)
  - Brigade: General of Brigade Pierre Margaron
    - 17th Dragoon Regiment, 1st, 2nd, and 3rd squadrons
    - 27th Dragoon Regiment, 1st, 2nd, and 3rd squadrons
  - Brigade: General of Brigade Jacques Léonard Laplanche
    - 18th Dragoon Regiment, 1st, 2nd, and 3rd squadrons
    - 19th Dragoon Regiment, 1st, 2nd, and 3rd squadrons
  - Brigade: unknown commander
    - 15th Dragoon Regiment, 1st, 2nd, and 3rd squadrons
    - 25th Dragoon Regiment, 1st, 2nd, and 3rd squadrons
  - Artillery: 6th Horse Artillery, 4th company (-), two 8-pound guns, one 6-inch howitzer
- Cavalry Division: General of Division Jacques Louis François Delaistre de Tilly (1,623)
  - 2nd Hussar Regiment, 1st, 2nd, and 3rd squadrons
  - 4th Hussar Regiment, 1st, 2nd, and 3rd squadrons
  - 5th Chasseurs-à-Cheval Regiment, 1st, 2nd, and 3rd squadrons

=== September 1812 ===
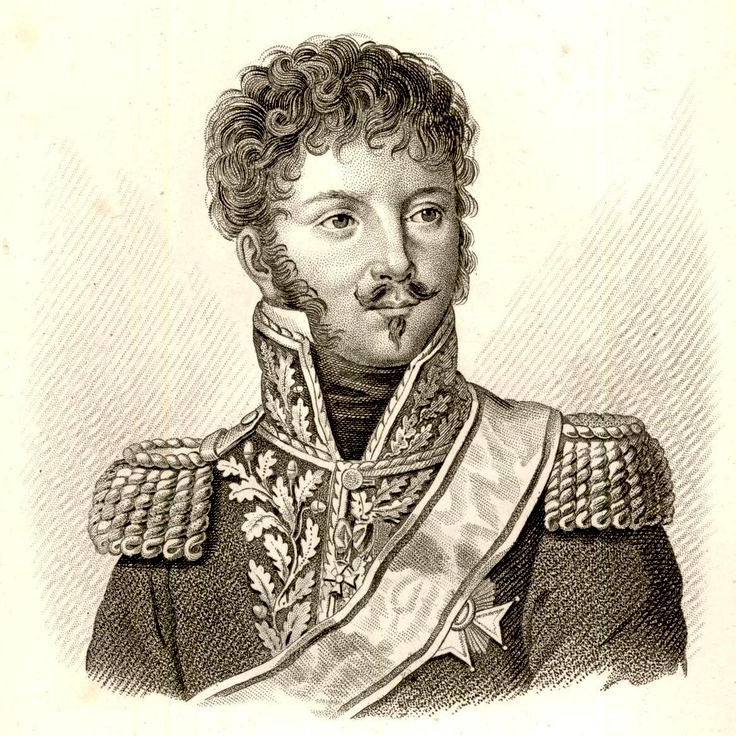
Louis-Pierre Montbrun

General of Division Louis-Pierre Montbrun † (10,436, 30 guns)

- 2nd Light Cavalry Division: General of Division Horace François Bastien Sébastiani de La Porta
  - 5th Hussar Regiment (4 squadrons)
  - 9th Hussar Regiment (4 squadrons)
  - 11th Chasseurs-à-Cheval Regiment (4 squadrons)
  - 12th Chasseurs-à-Cheval Regiment (4 squadrons)
  - Prussian Uhlan Regiment, four squadrons
  - 3rd Württemberg Jägers zu Pferde Regiment (4 squadrons)
  - 10th Polish Hussar Regiment (4 squadrons)
- 2nd Cuirassier Division: General of Division Pierre Watier
  - 5th Cuirassier Regiment (4 squadrons)
  - 8th Cuirassier Regiment (4 squadrons)
  - 10th Cuirassier Regiment (4 squadrons)
- 4th Cuirassier Division: General of Division Jean-Marie Defrance
  - 1st Carabinier Regiment (4 squadrons)
  - 2nd Carabinier Regiment (4 squadrons)
  - 1st Cuirassier Regiment (4 squadrons)
  - 4th Chevau-léger Lancer Regiment (4 squadrons)
- Attached Artillery: 30 guns in horse artillery batteries

=== October 1813 ===
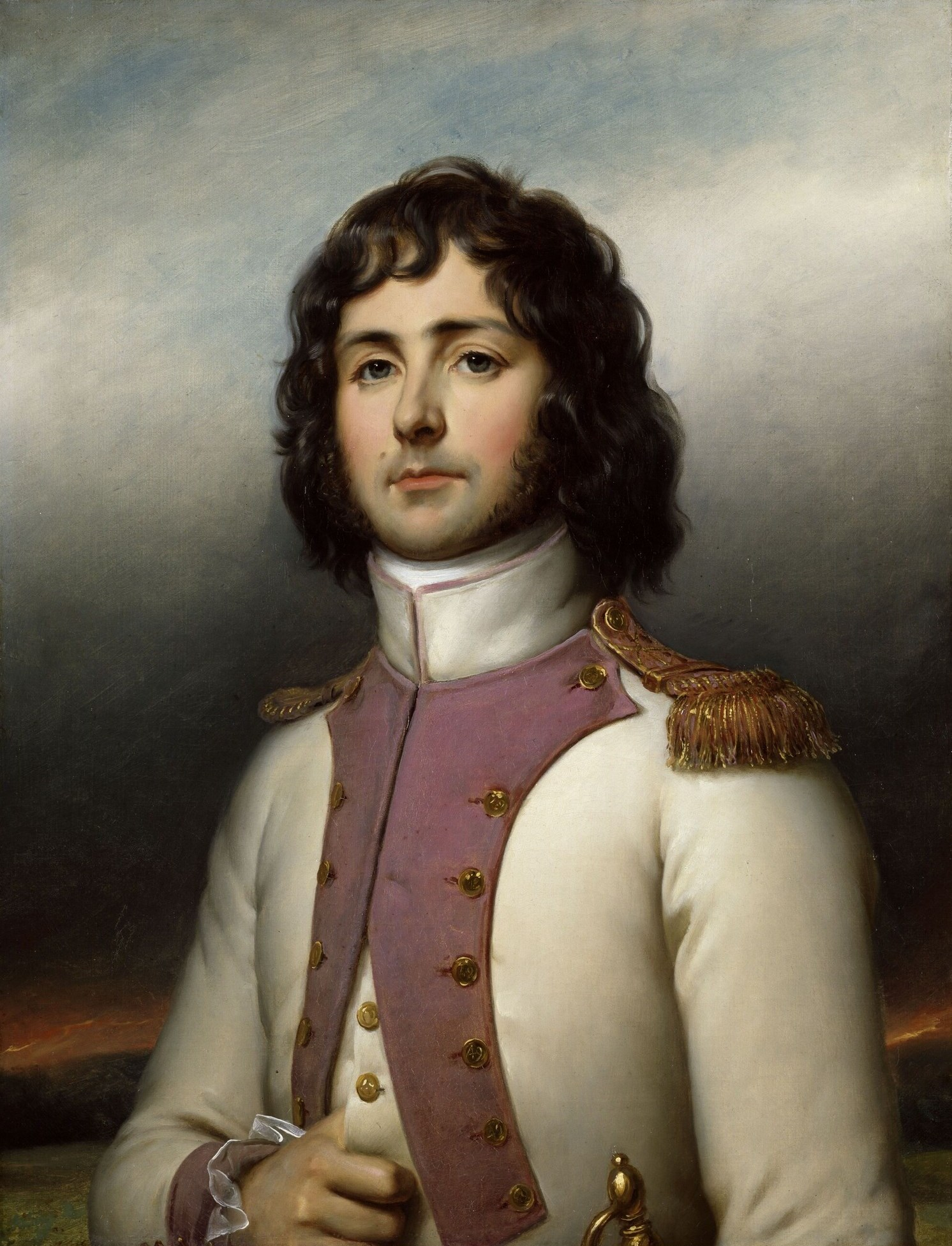
Horace Sébastiani

General of Division Horace François Bastien Sébastiani de La Porta

- 2nd Light Cavalry Division: General of Division Nicolas François Roussel d'Hurbal
  - 7th Light Cavalry Brigade: General of Brigade François-Joseph Gérard
    - 2nd Chevau-léger Lancer Regiment (3 squadrons)
    - 11th Chasseurs-à-Cheval Regiment (3 squadrons)
    - 12th Chasseurs-à-Cheval Regiment (3 squadrons)
  - 8th Light Cavalry Brigade: General of Brigade Jean-Baptiste Dommanget
    - 4th Chevau-léger Lancer Regiment (3 squadrons)
    - 5th Hussar Regiment (3 squadrons)
    - 9th Hussar Regiment (4 squadrons)
  - One-half horse artillery battery (3 guns)
- 4th Light Cavalry Division: General of Division Rémi Joseph Isidore Exelmans
  - 9th Light Cavalry Brigade: General of Brigade Antoine Maurin
    - 6th Chevau-léger Lancer Regiment (2 squadrons)
    - 4th Chasseurs-à-Cheval Regiment (2 squadrons)
    - 7th Chasseurs-à-Cheval Regiment (2 squadrons)
    - 20th Chasseurs-à-Cheval Regiment (2 squadrons)
  - 10th Light Cavalry Brigade: General of Brigade François Isidore Wathier
    - 23rd Chasseurs-à-Cheval Regiment (4 squadrons)
    - 24th Chasseurs-à-Cheval Regiment (3 squadrons)
    - 11th Hussar Regiment (2 squadrons)
  - One-half horse artillery battery (3 guns)
- 2nd Heavy Cavalry Division: General of Division Antoine-Louis Decrest de Saint-Germain
  - 1st Brigade: General of Brigade François Charles Jean Pierre Marie d'Avranges d'Haugeranville
    - 1st Carabinier Regiment (2 squadrons)
    - 2nd Carabinier Regiment (2 squadrons)
  - 2nd Brigade: General of Brigade Nicolas-Marin Thiry
    - 1st Cuirassier Regiment (2 squadrons)
    - 5th Cuirassier Regiment (3 squadrons)
    - 8th Cuirassier Regiment (2 squadrons)
    - 10th Cuirassier Regiment (2 squadrons)
  - One horse artillery battery (6 guns)
