= Emmanuel de Grouchy, marquis de Grouchy =

French Marshal

Marshal of the Empire Emmanuel de Grouchy Marquis de Grouchy
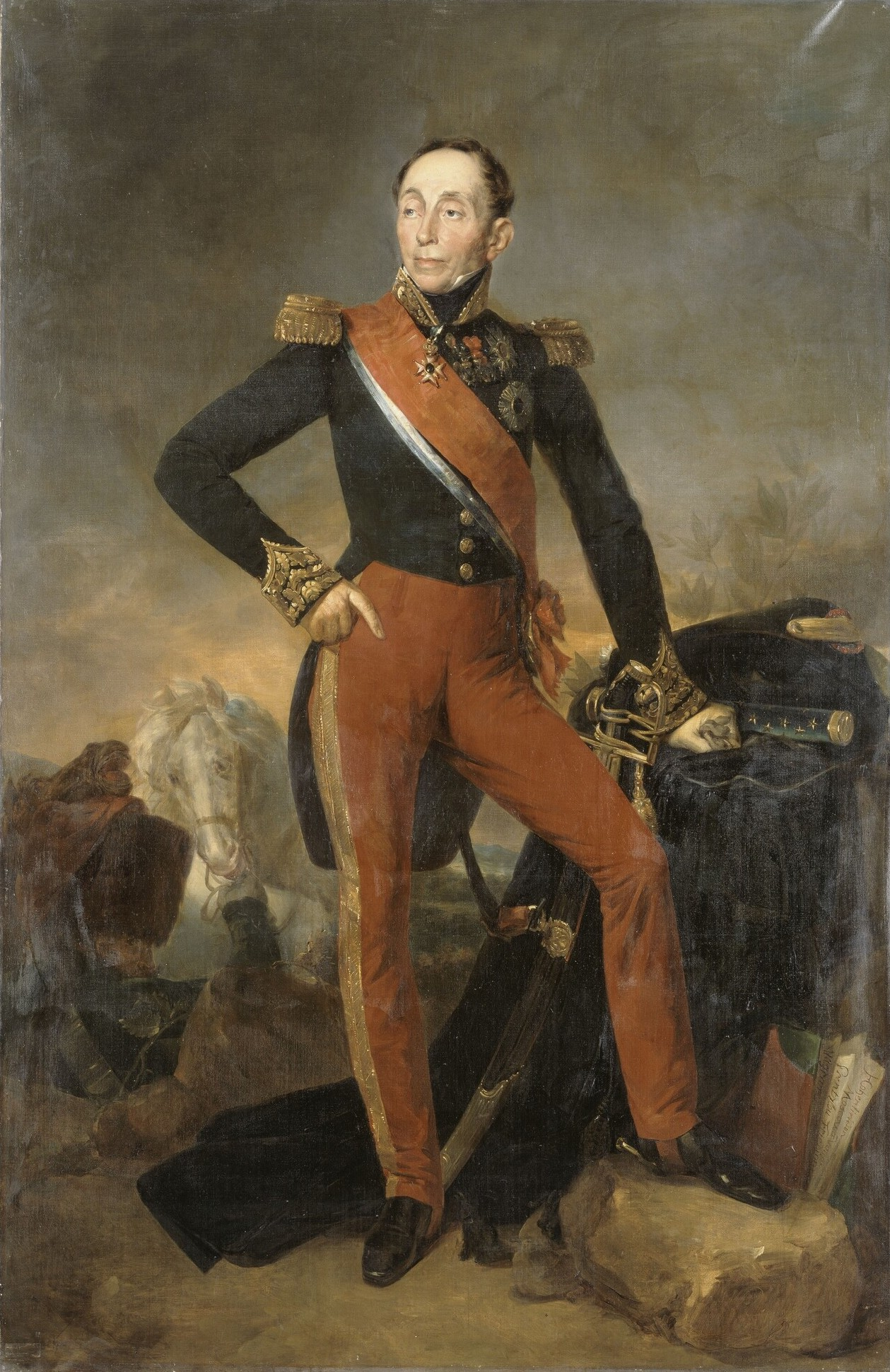
- Portrait by Jean-Sébastien Rouillard, 1835
- Born: 23 October 1766; Paris, France
- Died: 29 May 1847 (aged 80); Saint-Étienne, France
- Spouses: Cécile le Doulcet de Pontécoulant (m. 1785; died 1827) Joséphine-Fanny Hua (m. 1827)
- Children: 5
- Military career
- Allegiance: France
- Branch: Cavalry
- Service years: 1781–1815
- Rank: Marshal of the Empire
- Conflicts: See battles: French Revolutionary Wars; War of the First Coalition; Battle of Nantes; War of the Second Coalition; Battle of Novi; Battle of Hohenlinden; Napoleonic Wars; War of the Fourth Coalition; Battle of Eylau; Battle of Friedland; War of the Fifth Coalition; Battle of Raab; Battle of Wagram; French invasion of Russia; Battle of Smolensk; Battle of Borodino; War of the Sixth Coalition; Battle of Brienne; Battle of La Rothière; Battle of Craonne; Battle of Vauchamps; Hundred Days; Battle of Ligny; Waterloo campaign; Battle of Wavre
- Awards: Grand Eagle of the Legion of Honour; Knight of the Order of the Iron Crown; Grand Cross of the Military Merit Order of Bavaria

Emmanuel de Grouchy, marquis de Grouchy (English: /ˈɡruːʃi/ GROO-shee, French: [ɛmanɥɛl də ɡʁuʃi]; 23 October 1766 – 29 May 1847) was a French military leader who served during the French Revolutionary Wars and the Napoleonic Wars. He was the last Marshal of the Empire to be created by Napoleon, and is best known for his actions during the Waterloo campaign.

== Early life ==
Grouchy was born in Paris on 23 October 1766 into a family of the noblesse d'épée, the son of François-Jacques de Grouchy, 1st Marquis de Grouchy (born 1715) and Gilberte Fréteau de Pény (died 1793). He was raised at the Château de Villette (known as "the little Versailles"), his family's estate in Condécourt, northwest of Paris. He was the brother of Sophie de Condorcet, a salon hostess and writer. Another sister, Charlotte, was the wife of physiologist and philosopher Pierre Cabanis.

Destined to a military career from birth, Grouchy attended the Artillery School of Strasbourg from 1780 to 1781, graduating as lieutenant in the La Fère Regiment. He was later transferred to the cavalry in 1782, and was appointed captain in the Royal Foreign Regiment in 1784. In 1785, Grouchy was presented to King Louis XVI, and the next year he was appointed lieutenant colonel of the Scottish Company of the King's Life Guards.

== French Revolutionary Wars ==
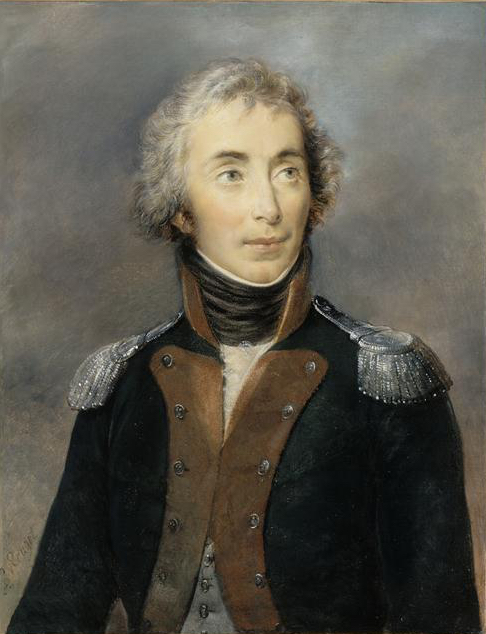
Grouchy as a colonel of the 2nd Dragoon Regiment in 1792, by Georges Rouget (1835)

Despite his aristocratic birth and his connection to the court, Grouchy was a convinced supporter of the French Revolution in 1789, along with his brother-in-law, the Marquis de Condorcet, and had in consequence to leave the Life Guards. Refusing to emigrate, Grouchy remained faithful to the revolutionary cause and rejoined the army. By 1791 he was lieutenant colonel of the 12th Regiment of chasseurs à cheval. In 1792 he served during the invasion of Savoy, first as colonel of the 12th Regiment of chasseurs à cheval then of the 2nd Dragoon Regiment. After the campaign of 1793, Grouchy was promoted to brigade general and was made a cavalry commander in the Army of the Alps.

In 1794, Grouchy was sent to the War in the Vendée, where he distinguished himself defending Nantes from Royalist rebels led by François de Charette, for which he received the rank of general of division. Shortly afterwards, he was expelled from the army as being of noble birth, and remained as a simple soldier in the National Guard. Grouchy was reinstated to his rank the next year and returned to Western France, where he served under General Lazare Hoche in the defence against the Quiberon Expedition in July 1795. In late 1796, he took part in the abortive expedition to Ireland as Hoche's second-in-command, and the next year he was assigned to the Army of the North.

Grouchy was deployed to Italy in 1798 under the orders of General Jean-Baptiste Jourdan. By skillful measures, he was able to persuade the King of Sardinia, Charles Emmanuel IV, to renounce his rule over Piedmont, then received from the Directory the task of organizing the conquered territory. He asked to join the Egyptian campaign, but General Napoleon Bonaparte preferred General Louis-Alexandre Berthier to him. Remaining with the Army of Italy, Grouchy distinguished himself greatly as a divisional commander in the 1799 campaign against the Austrians and Russians. In covering the retreat of the French after the defeat at the Battle of Novi, Grouchy received fourteen wounds and was taken prisoner.

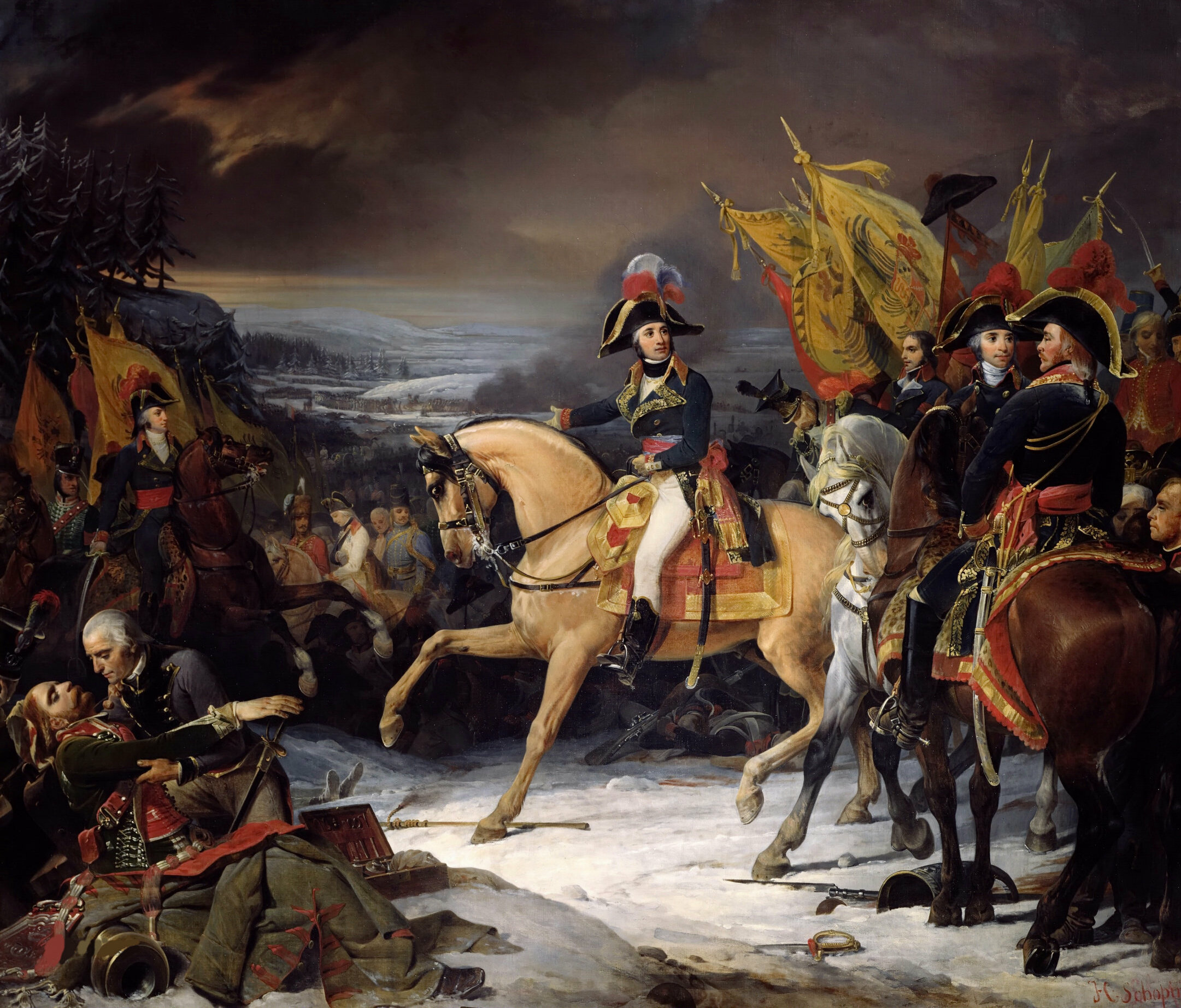
The Battle of Hohenlinden by Henri Frédéric Schopin, 1836. Grouchy is on the right of the painting alongside Marshal Ney.

During his captivity, which lasted nearly a year, Grouchy protested in a letter against Bonaparte's coup d'état of 18 Brumaire that established the Consulate, and had this letter signed by several officers. Despite this protest, upon his release he was at once re-employed by the First Consul, and distinguished himself again at the Battle of Hohenlinden. After the Peace of Lunéville he was appointed Inspector General of the Cavalry. Following the Cadoudal affair, Grouchy was under Bonaparte's suspicion for some time due to his association with General Jean Moreau, but soon returned to favor, and in 1803 he received the mission of having Charles Louis recognized as King of Etruria.

== Napoleonic Wars ==
Grouchy took part in the Ulm campaign in 1805, during the War of the Third Coalition. He later fought with distinction at the battles of Eylau and Friedland in 1807 against the Prussian and Russian forces during the War of the Fourth Coalition. Grouchy entered Spain in 1808 commanding the twelve squadrons (2,850 men) of the Cavalry Division of Marshal Moncey's Corps of Observation of the Ocean Coast, and was appointed governor of Madrid.

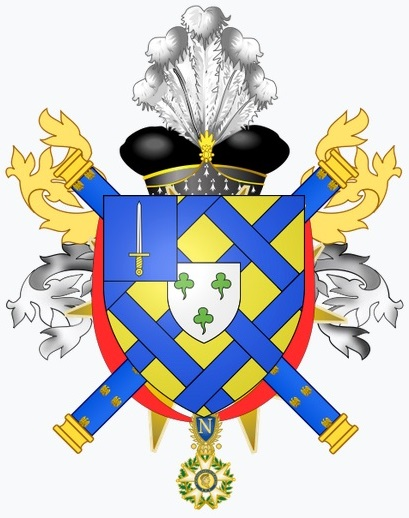
Heraldic achievement of Emmanuel de Grouchy as comte d'Empire

At the time of the War of the Fifth Coalition in 1809, Grouchy commanded the cavalry of the Army of Italy in Viceroy Eugène de Beauharnais's advance to Vienna, and contributed to the victories at the battles of Raab and Wagram. As a reward for his services, Grouchy was made Colonel General of the chasseurs à cheval of the Grande Armée, and received the title of comte d'Empire.

During the Russian campaign in 1812, Grouchy was appointed commander of the III Cavalry Corps and led the corps at Smolensk and Borodino. During the retreat from Moscow, Napoleon appointed him to command the Sacred Squadron, a unit composed exclusively of picked officers and responsible for the emperor's personal protection. His almost continuous service with the cavalry led Napoleon to decline in 1813 to place Grouchy at the head of an army corps, and Grouchy thereupon retired to his estates, taking no part in the German campaign of 1813.

When the Sixth Coalition invaded France in early 1814, Grouchy hastened to take part in the defensive campaign and asked to return to service. Napoleon gave him the command of a cavalry division, which Grouchy skillfully lead at the battles of Brienne, La Rothière, Vauchamps, and Craonne, where he was severely wounded. Upon Napoleon's abdication and the First Bourbon Restoration, Grouchy lost his rank of Colonel General of the chasseurs à cheval, which was given to the Duke of Berry, son of Charles, Count of Artois (later King Charles X of France), and was allowed to retire by King Louis XVIII.

=== Hundred Days ===
In March 1815, Grouchy rallied to Napoleon on his return to power during the Hundred Days. He was made a Marshal of the Empire on 5 April 1815 (against the recommendation of Marshal Davout, then Minister for War), and received the command of the 7th, 8th, 9th and 10th divisions. Grouchy directed the operations against the Duke of Angoulême's Royalist army in Southern France. After the Royalists were defeated, he unwillingly allowed the Duke to leave the country under the terms of the Convention of La Palud, which Grouchy had initially refused to recognize. He then organized the defences in the Alpine front, and was made a Peer of France on 2 June.

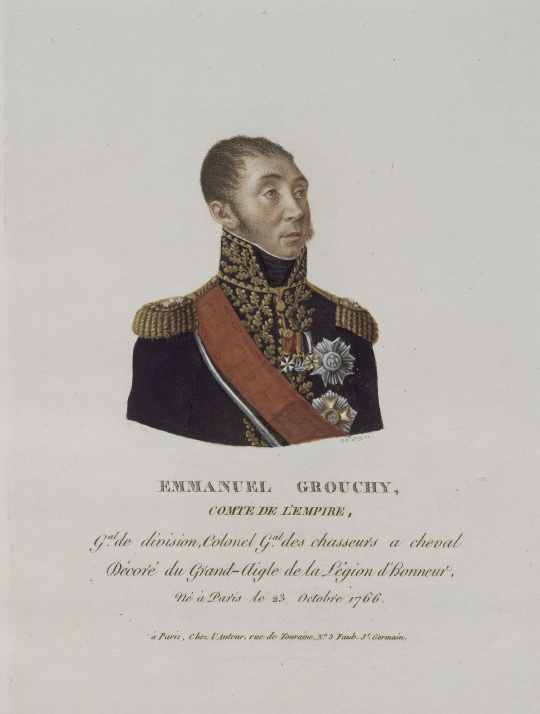
Grouchy, as Marshal of the Empire

In the Waterloo Campaign, Grouchy commanded the reserve cavalry of the army, and after the Battle of Ligny he was appointed to command the right wing to pursue the Prussians. Napoleon sent Grouchy to pursue a part of the retreating Prussian army under the command of General Johann von Thielmann. On 17 June, Grouchy was unable to close with the Prussians. Despite hearing the cannon sound from the nearby Battle of Waterloo, he decided to follow the Prussians along the route literally specified in his orders, issued by Napoleon via Marshal Soult, while the Coalition armies attempted to combine forces to defeat Napoleon. He won a tactical victory over the Prussian army's rearguard at the Battle of Wavre on 18–19 June 1815, but the delaying action by III Corps allowed the main Prussian force to join Wellington at Waterloo while preventing Grouchy from doing the same.

So far as resistance was possible after the great disaster, Grouchy made it, gathering up the remnants of Napoleon's army and retiring, swiftly and unbroken, to Paris. After Napoleon's second abdication, he addressed a proclamation to his soldiers in support of Napoleon II. After interposing his reorganized forces between the enemy and the capital, Grouchy resigned his command into the hands of Marshal Davout.

== Later life ==
After the second restoration of the Bourbons, an attempt to have Grouchy condemned to death by a court-martial failed; however, he was proscribed and went into exile in the United States, settling in Philadelphia along with several other French officers of the Hundred Days. He was amnestied by King Louis XVIII in November 1819 and departed for France in May 1820. Upon his return Grouchy was reinstated as general, but not as marshal nor as peer of France. For many years thereafter he was equally an object of aversion to the court party, as a member of their own class who had joined the Revolution and Napoleon, and to his comrades of the Grande Armée as the supposed betrayer of Napoleon.

Grouchy returned to favor after the overthrow of the Bourbons in the Revolution of 1830. King Louis Philippe I gave him back the marshal's baton in 1831 and restored him to the Chamber of Peers in 1832. Grouchy died in Saint-Étienne while returning from a trip to Italy on 29 May 1847, aged 80. He was buried in the Père Lachaise Cemetery in Paris.

== Family ==
He was married firstly (1785) to Cécile le Doulcet de Pontécoulant (1767–1827), sister of Louis Gustave le Doulcet, comte de Pontécoulant, by whom he had 4 children:

- Ernestine (1787–1866)
- Alphonse (1789–1864)
- Aimee-Clementine (1791–1826)
- Victor (1796–1864)

He married secondly, in 1827, Joséphine-Fanny Hua (1802–1889) and had 1 daughter:

- Noemie (1830–1843)

== Works ==
Grouchy published the following:

- Observations sur la relation de la campagne de 1815 par le général de Gourgaud (Philadelphia and Paris, 1818)
- Refutation de quelques articles des mémoires de M. le Duc de Rovigo (Paris,1829)
- Fragments Historiques Relatifs a la Campagne de 1815 et a la Bataille de Waterloo (Paris, 1829–1830) — in reply to Barthélemy and Méry, and to Marshal Gérard
- Reclamation du marchal de Grouchy (Paris, 1834)
- Plainte contre le general Baron Berthezène — Berthezène, formerly a divisional commander under Gérard, stated in reply to this defence that he had no intention of accusing Grouchy of ill faith.

== Bibliography ==
  - Mémoires du maréchal Marquis de Grouchy, éditeur Édouard Dentu (Paris, 1873–1874);
  - General Marquis de Grouchy, Le Général Grouchy en Irlande (Paris, 1866)
  - Le Maréchal Grouchy du 16 au 18 juin, 1815 (Paris, 1864)
  - Appel à l'histoire sur les faites de l'aile droite de l'armée française (Paris, n.d.)
  - Sévère Justice sur les faits ... du 28 juin au 3 juillet, 1815 (Paris, 1866)
