= Auguste Jean Ameil =

French soldier (1776–1822)

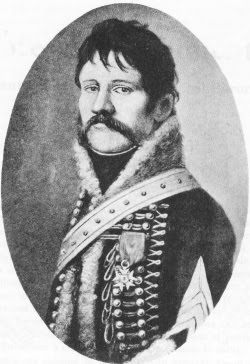
General Auguste Jean Ameil

General Auguste Jean Joseph Gilbert, baron Ameil (French pronunciation: [oɡyst ʒɑ̃ amɛj]; January 6, 1776 – September 16, 1822) was a French soldier who fought during the French Revolution and the First French Empire, attaining the rank of Brigade General in 1812.

== Biography ==
Born in Paris, the son of a parliamentary lawyer, Ameil entered the army as a simple infantryman on July 14, 1789. He would subsequently rise through every rank in the army. In 1805 he was made squadron commander of a cavalry company in Marshal Bernadotte's army. He then participated in the German, Polish, and Russian campaigns. On July 12, 1809, he was named colonel of the 24th Chasseurs de Cheval [Light Cavalry] Regiment, and on November 21, 1812, he was made a Brigade General.

After the abdication of Napoleon in 1814, Ameil accepted the restored Bourbon regime and was made a Knight of the Order of Saint Louis. He then accompanied the Count of Artois (Charles X) to Lyon, with orders to stop Napoleon's advance. However, the army deserted en masse to Napoleon's side, and when the Count retreated for Paris, Ameil pledged himself to Napoleon. He was sent to Auxerre, but was intercepted by royalist forces and sent as a prisoner to Paris on the same day that Napoleon victoriously entered the Tuileries Palace.

Upon regaining his liberty, Ameil took part in the formation of Napoleon's army. Hedging somewhat, he sent a letter to Louis XVIII on the day of the Battle of Waterloo for the purpose of justifying his conduct. The letter was not persuasive: court martial proceedings against him were soon begun. To escape, Ameil travelled to England, later travelling to Hannover with the intention of reaching Sweden and the protection of Bernadotte.

However, he was arrested in Lüneburg and transferred to Hildesheim as a prisoner of the state. Accused of high treason, on November 15, 1816, he was condemned to death by court martial. However, the sentence was not carried out, and on July 25, 1821, he was pardoned by a royal decree and his titles, rights, honors, and rank were restored.

On October 24, 1821, he retired. The following year, he died in Paris, on the same day that he was named a Commander of the Legion of Honor by Louis XVIII. By this time he was also a Knight of the Order of Saint Hubert of Bavaria and of the Royal Swedish Order of the Sword.
