= François Étienne de Kellermann =

French cavalry general (1770–1835)

Général de Division François Etienne de Kellermann Duke of Valmy
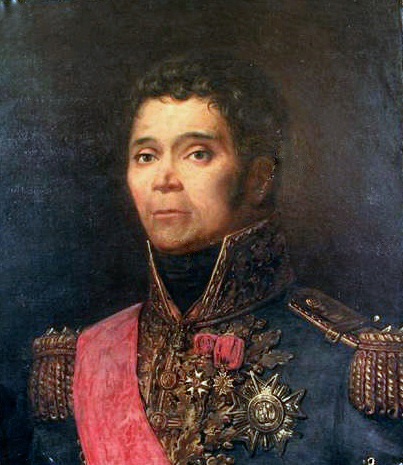
- General Kellermann, 2nd Duke of Valmy
- Born: 4 August 1770; Metz, France
- Died: 2 June 1835 (aged 64); Paris, France
- Military career
- Allegiance: France
- Branch: French Army
- Service years: 1785– 1795–1815
- Rank: Division General
- Commands: Dragoon Division; IV Cavalry Corps; III Cavalry Corps; VI Cavalry Corps
- Conflicts: Great French War; Battle of Alba de Tormes
- Awards: Legion of Honour (Grand Cross)
- Other work: politician

François Étienne de Kellermann, 2nd Duke of Valmy (English: /ˈkɛlərmɑːn/ KEL-ər-mahn, French: [fʁɑ̃swa etjɛn də kɛlɛʁman]; 4 August 1770 – 2 June 1835) was a French cavalry general noted for his daring and skillful exploits during the Napoleonic Wars. He was the son of François Christophe de Kellermann and the father of the diplomat François Christophe Edmond de Kellermann.

== Early life and French Revolutionary Wars ==
Born in Metz, Kellermann served for a short time in his father's regiment of Hussars before entering the diplomatic service in 1791. In 1793 he again joined the army, serving chiefly under his father's command in the Alps, and rising in 1796 to the rank of chef de brigade. In the latter part of Bonaparte's celebrated Italian campaign of 1796-1797 the younger Kellermann attracted the future emperor's notice by his brilliant conduct at the forcing of the Tagliamento. He was made general of brigade immediately after, and continued to serve in Italy after the Peace of Campo Formio, being employed successively in the armies of Rome and Naples under Macdonald and Championnet.

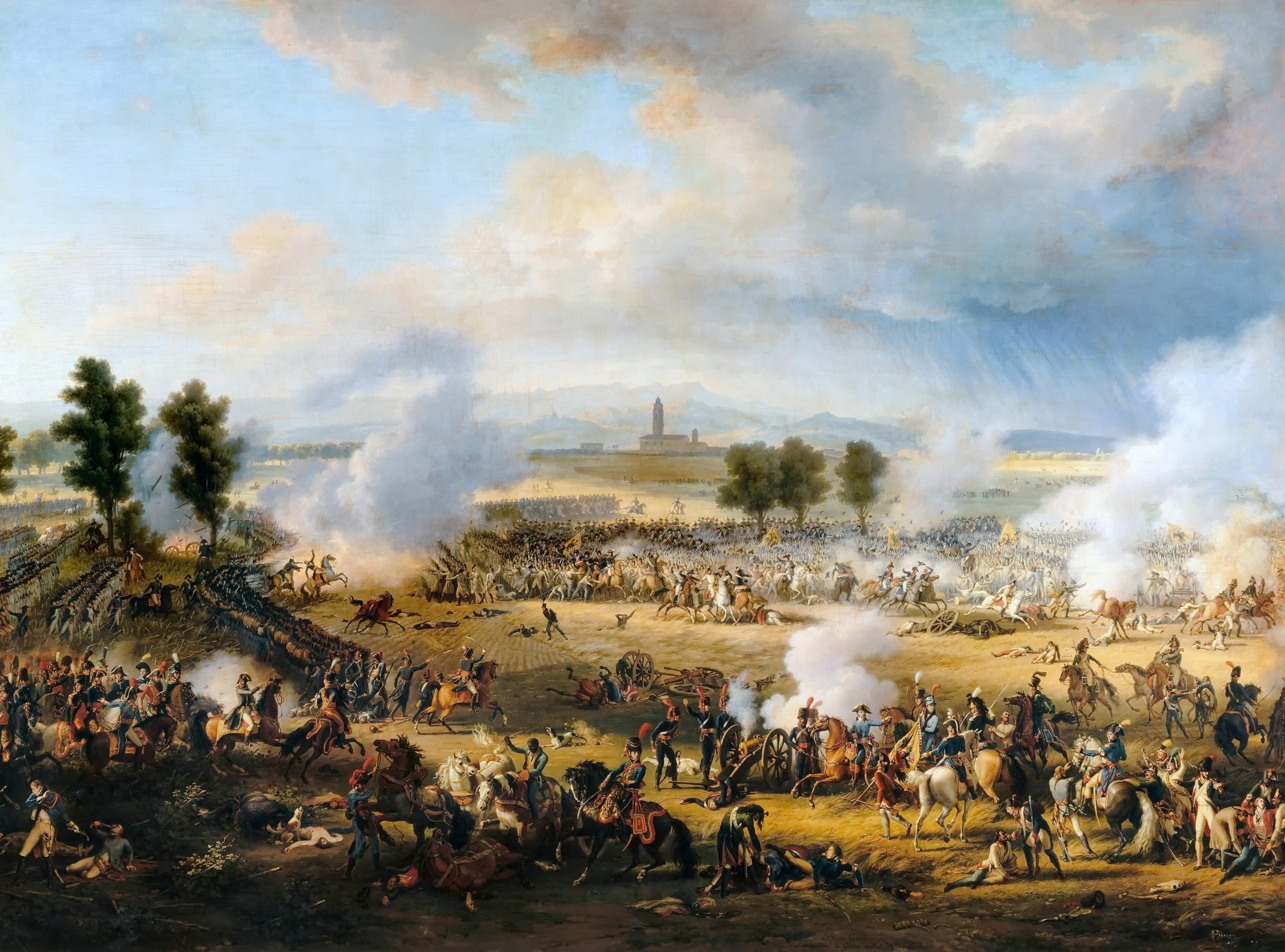
The Battle of Marengo by Louis-François Lejeune, 1801. Kellerman's cavalry charge is shown in the background

At the Battle of Marengo (1800), he commanded a heavy cavalry brigade under the First Consul and he initiated and implemented one of the most famous cavalry charges of history, which, with Desaix's infantry attack, decided the issue of the battle. The French forces had fought all day and were withdrawing. The Austrian troops had formed large columns to pursue the retreating French. In the evening, Kellermann's depleted cavalry brigade that had been occupied South of the field returned. Joined by a few squadrons of dragoons and other elements, Kellermann's men's perfectly timed charge rode down three Austrian grenadier battalions. Then, he rapidly reformed his troopers, charged and routed an Austrian dragoon regiment. The dragoons stampeded through the Austrian infantry columns, causing a general rout, securing a French victory in a battle that seemed all but lost just an hour earlier.

He was promoted general of division at once, but as early as the evening of the battle he resented what he thought to be an attempt to belittle his exploit. A heated controversy followed as to the influence of Kellermann's charge on the course of the battle, and in this controversy he displayed neither tact nor forbearance. However, his merits were too great for his career to be ruined either by his conduct in the dispute or by the frequent scandals, and even by the frauds, of his private life.

== Napoleonic Wars ==
Unlike his father's, his title to fame did not rest on one fortunate opportunity. Though not the most famous, he was perhaps the ablest of all Napoleon's cavalry leaders, and distinguished himself at the Battle of Austerlitz in command of a light cavalry division on the left flank. Kellermann commanded a cavalry division under Jean-Andoche Junot in the 1807 Invasion of Portugal. At the Battle of Vimeiro he led the grenadier reserve and, after the French defeat, used his considerable diplomatic skills in negotiating the Convention of Cintra. At the Battle of Alba de Tormes on 28 November 1809, he led 3,000 troopers in a cavalry charge that routed the Duke Del Parque's Spanish army. He served with distinction on other occasions in the Peninsular War. His rapacity was notorious in Spain, yet Napoleon met his unconvincing excuses with the words, "General, whenever your name is brought before me, I think of nothing but Marengo."

He was on sick leave during the French invasion of Russia in 1812. However, in 1813 and 1814 he led the IV Cavalry Corps with conspicuous skill. He retained his rank under the first Restoration, but joined Napoleon during the Hundred Days, and commanded the III Cavalry Corps in the Waterloo campaign.

He led his squadrons in a famous cavalry charge at the Battle of Quatre Bras on 16 June 1815. In this action, Kellermann was peremptorily ordered by Marshal Michel Ney to make a frontal charge on the Anglo-Allied line with the 770 troopers of Guiton's cuirassier brigade. Against cavalry doctrine, Kellermann called for an immediate gallop so that his men would not see how badly they were outnumbered. In four separate charges, the 8th and 11th Cuirassiers broke the 69th Foot and captured a color, scattered a Hanoverian battalion and sent the 33rd and 73rd Foot fleeing for the safety of a nearby wood. The horsemen briefly seized the crucial crossroads, but the odds were too great. Unhorsed, Kellermann narrowly escaped by holding onto the stirrup of one of his cavalrymen.

At Waterloo, he was wounded. Initially, Kellermann's two divisions were deployed in support of the infantry in the left center of the line. Early on, cuirassiers — either Kellermann's or Milhaud's — destroyed a carelessly deployed Hanoverian infantry battalion. In the afternoon, Ney sent the III Cavalry Corps into a mass attack against the British infantry squares between Hougoumont and La Haye Sainte. At some time in the late afternoon, cuirassiers — possibly Kellermann's — rode down the 5th and 8th King's German Legion battalions. But the futile and repeated charges against the main Allied line failed to break a single square and used up the French cavalry.

Kellermann was disgraced at the second Restoration, and, on succeeding to his father's title and seat in the Chamber of Peers in 1820, at once took up and maintained till the fall of Charles X in 1830 an attitude of determined opposition to the Bourbons. He died on 2 June 1835.

KELLERMANN, F. is inscribed on the south pillar (21st column) of the Arc de Triomphe.

== Bibliography ==
- Arnold, James R. Marengo & Hohenlinden. Pen & Sword, 2005.
- Balkoski, Joseph. Strategy & Tactics magazine 74, "Ney vs. Wellington: The Battle of Quatre Bras." May–June 1979.
- Smith, Digby. The Napoleonic Wars Data Book. London: Greenhill, 1998.
- Weller, Jac. Wellington in the Peninsula. London: Nicholas Vane, 1962.

Attribution:
