= Military camp =

Semi-permanent facility for the lodging of an army

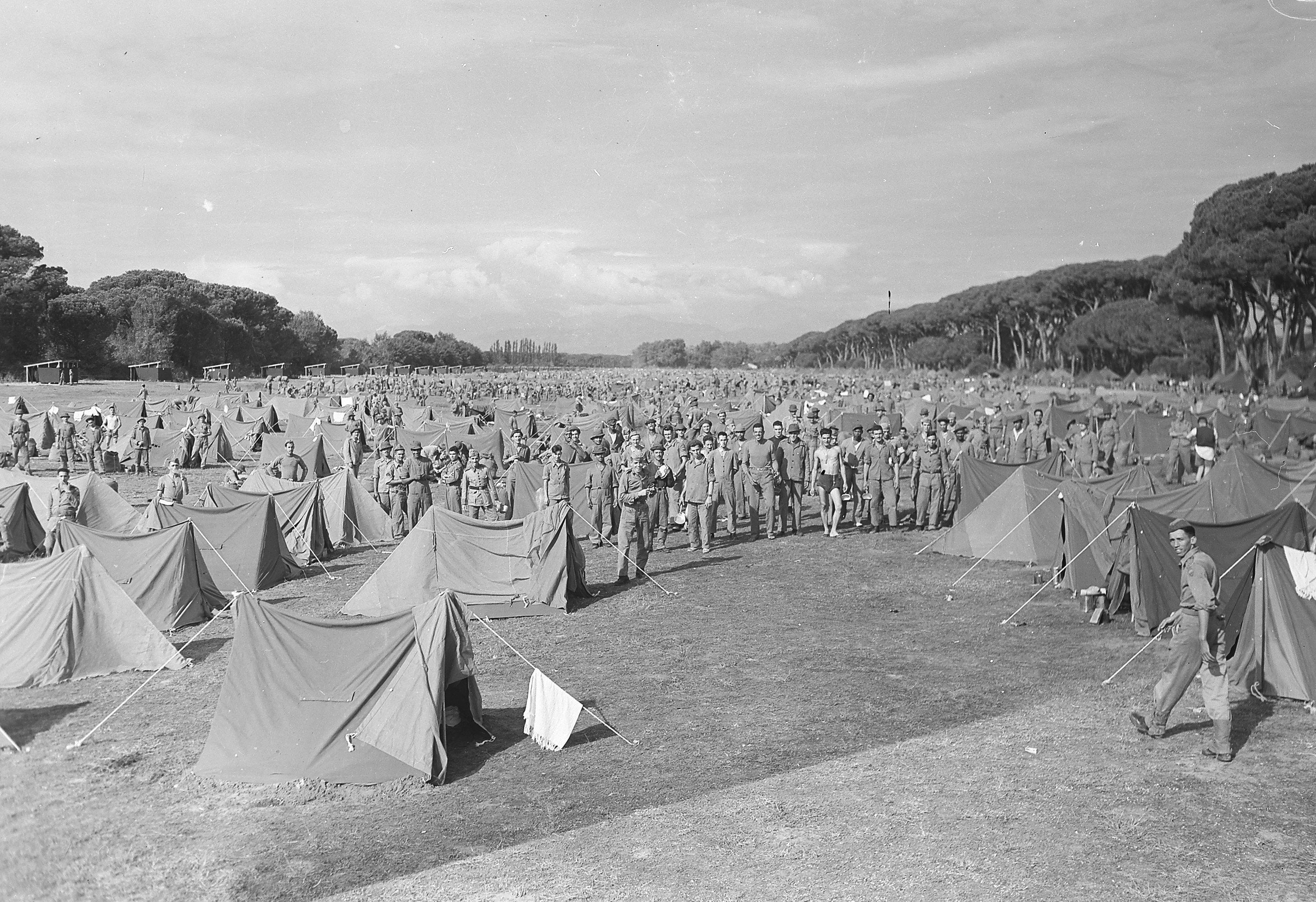
Camp of the Brazilian Expeditionary Force in Italy during World War II, 1945

A military camp or bivouac is a semi-permanent military base, for the lodging of an army. Camps are erected when a military force travels away from a major installation or fort during training or operations, and often have the form of large campsites.

In the British Army, Commonwealth armies, the United States Marine Corps, and other military forces, permanent military bases are also called camps, including Tidworth Camp, Blandford Camp, Bulford Camp, and Devil's Tower Camp of the British Army; and Camp Lejeune and Camp Geiger of the United States Marine Corps.

== Background ==
Historically, army camps referred to large field camps of military troops that could include several thousand people. In the Middle Ages, camp followers (i.e. wives, prostitutes, sutlers, laundresses, craftsmen, blacksmiths, squires, etc.) were also integrated into the camps. The composition varied, depending on whether it was a mercenary army with a few leaders, or large armies with many nobles and knights, such as those of the Crusades.

== Leaguer ==
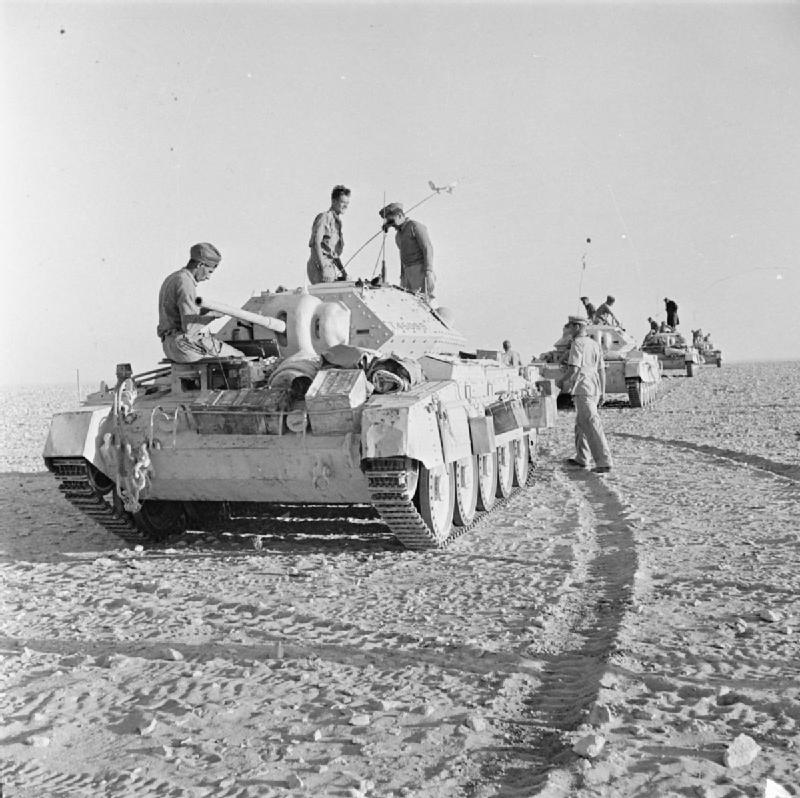
Crusader tanks going into leaguer after a patrol

Leaguer and harbour are British terms for military camps; 'harbour' for temporary camps. The name, coming from 16th Century Dutch leger, was used for a military camp, particularly one laying siege.

During World War II leaguer was used in the Western Desert campaign particularly for camps of armoured formations. The arrangement of the leaguer depended on purpose and whether day or night. By day dispersed for protection against air attack with elements of the formation able to cover each other, at night ("close leaguer") the tank regiment forming a square or triangle, the tanks facing out with the support vehicles drawn up in the middle (but moving out of the leaguer and to the rear just before dawn).

== Other uses ==
The term "bivouac" also has non-military uses.

In rally raid, the bivouac is an area where teams reside and work on their vehicles between stages. The Dakar Rally's bivouac sees between 2,500 and 3,000 people daily.

In the Rhineland carnival tradition, "bivouac" refers to an open-air carnival, usually organized by a carnival society. A well-known example is the "Funkenbiwak" organized by the Rote Funken carnival society, which takes place on the Neumarkt square in Cologne.

== Gallery ==
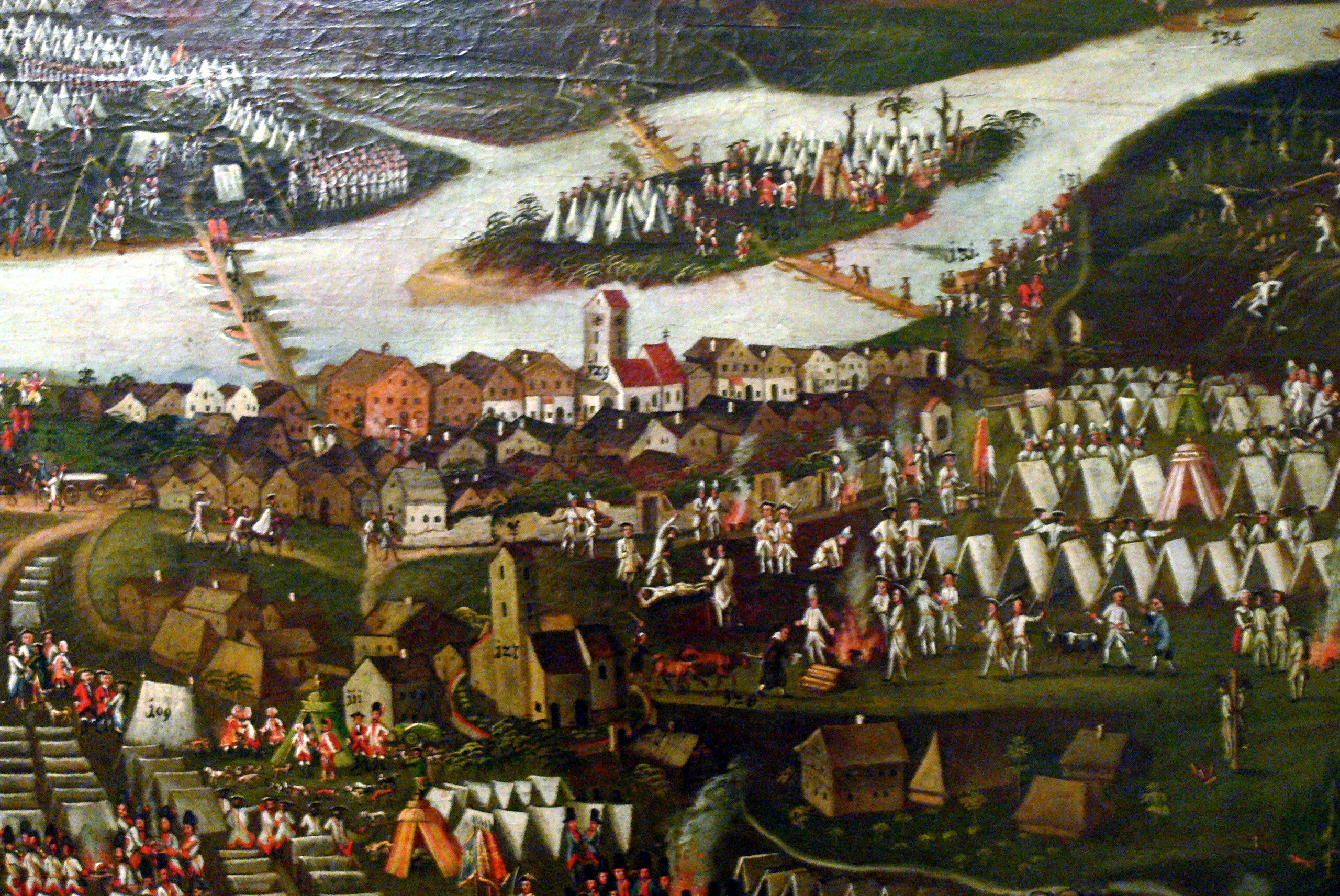
Scenes of the Austrian War of Succession, 1741-1745

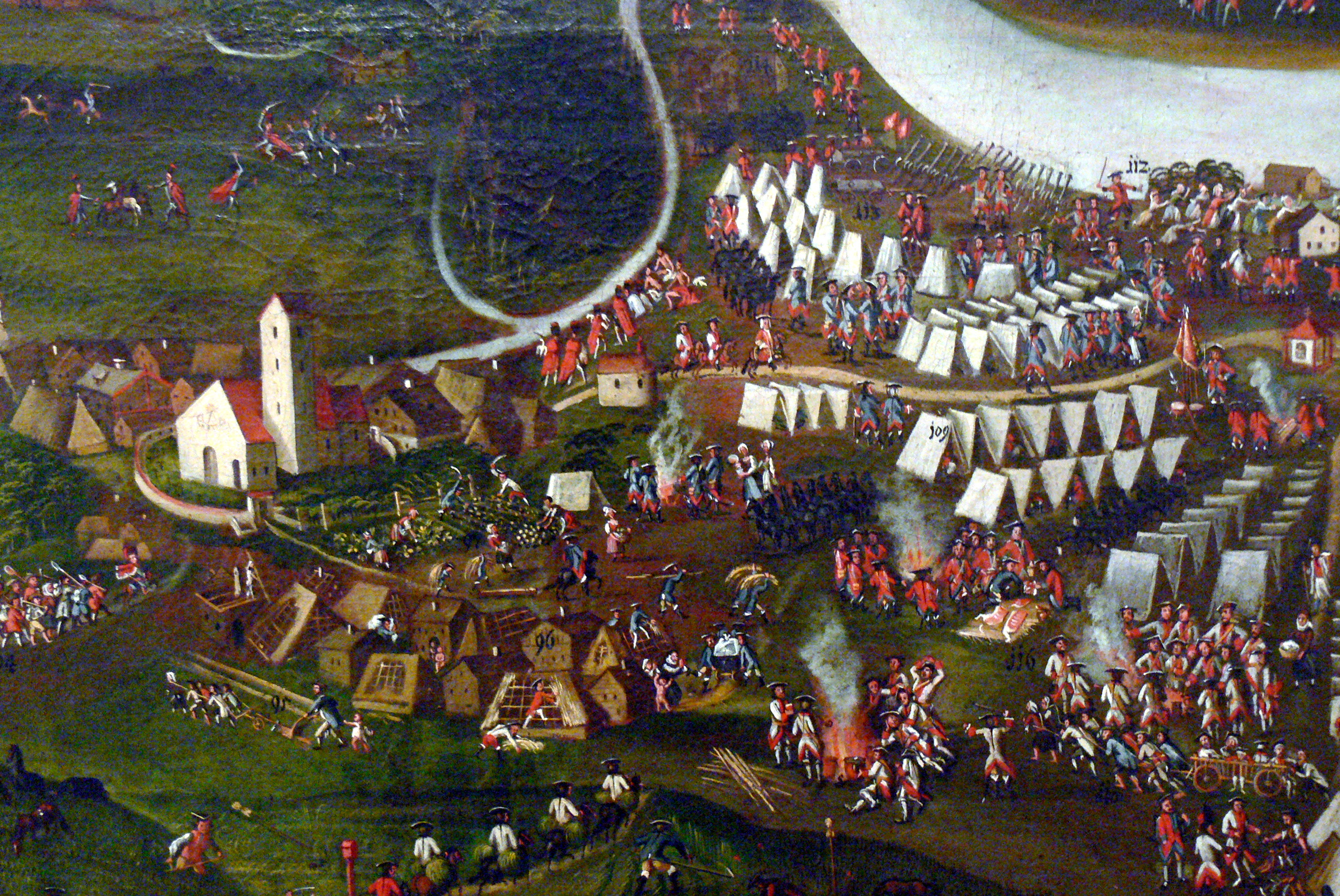
Scenes of the Austrian War of Succession, 1741-1745

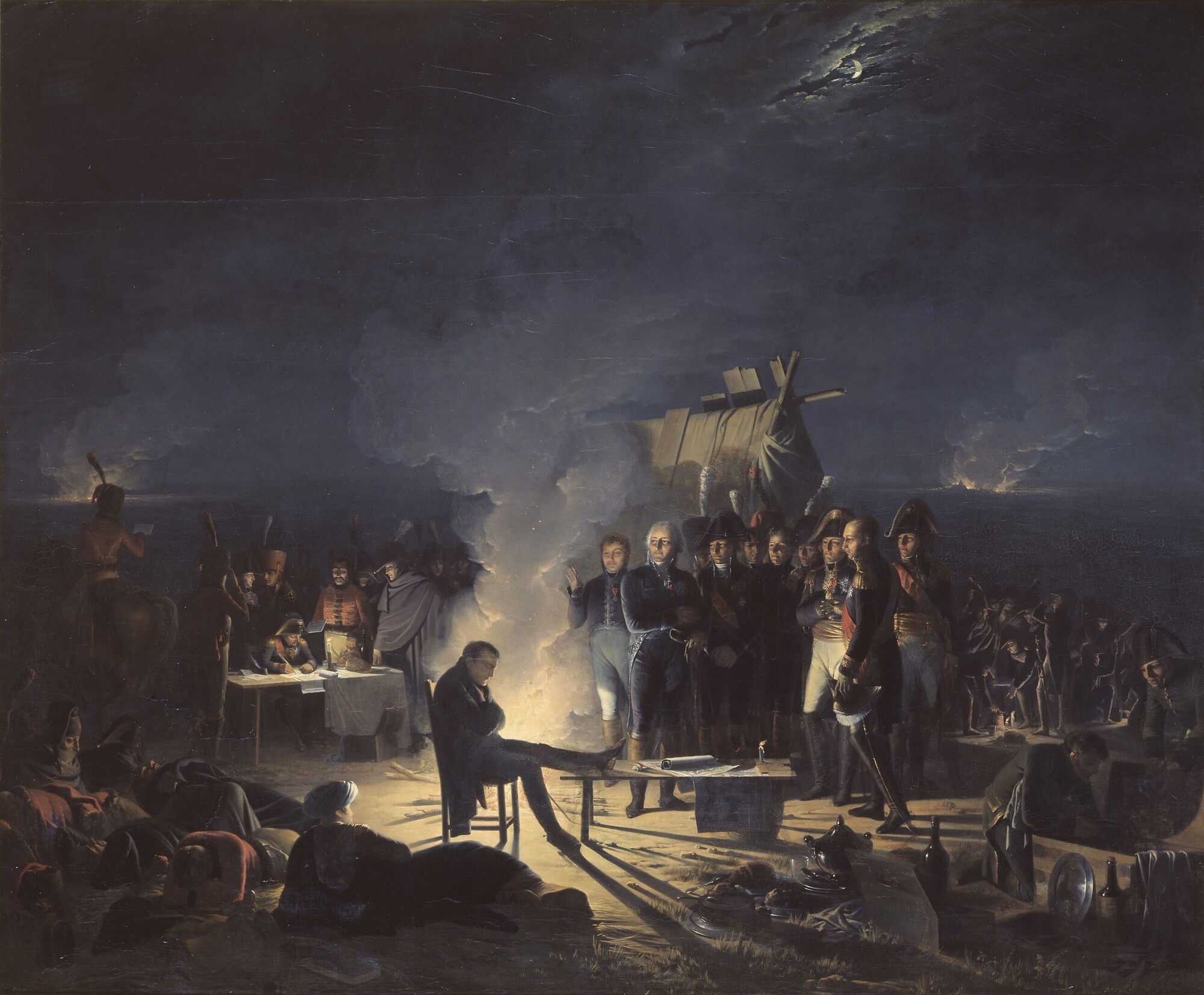
Napoleon's Bivouac on the Battlefield of Wagram by Adolphe Roehn, 1810

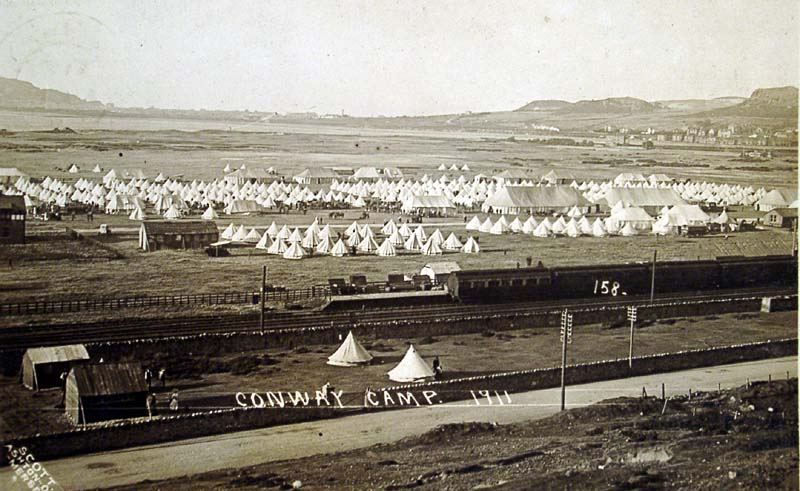
Military camp at Conwy on the North Wales coast, 1911

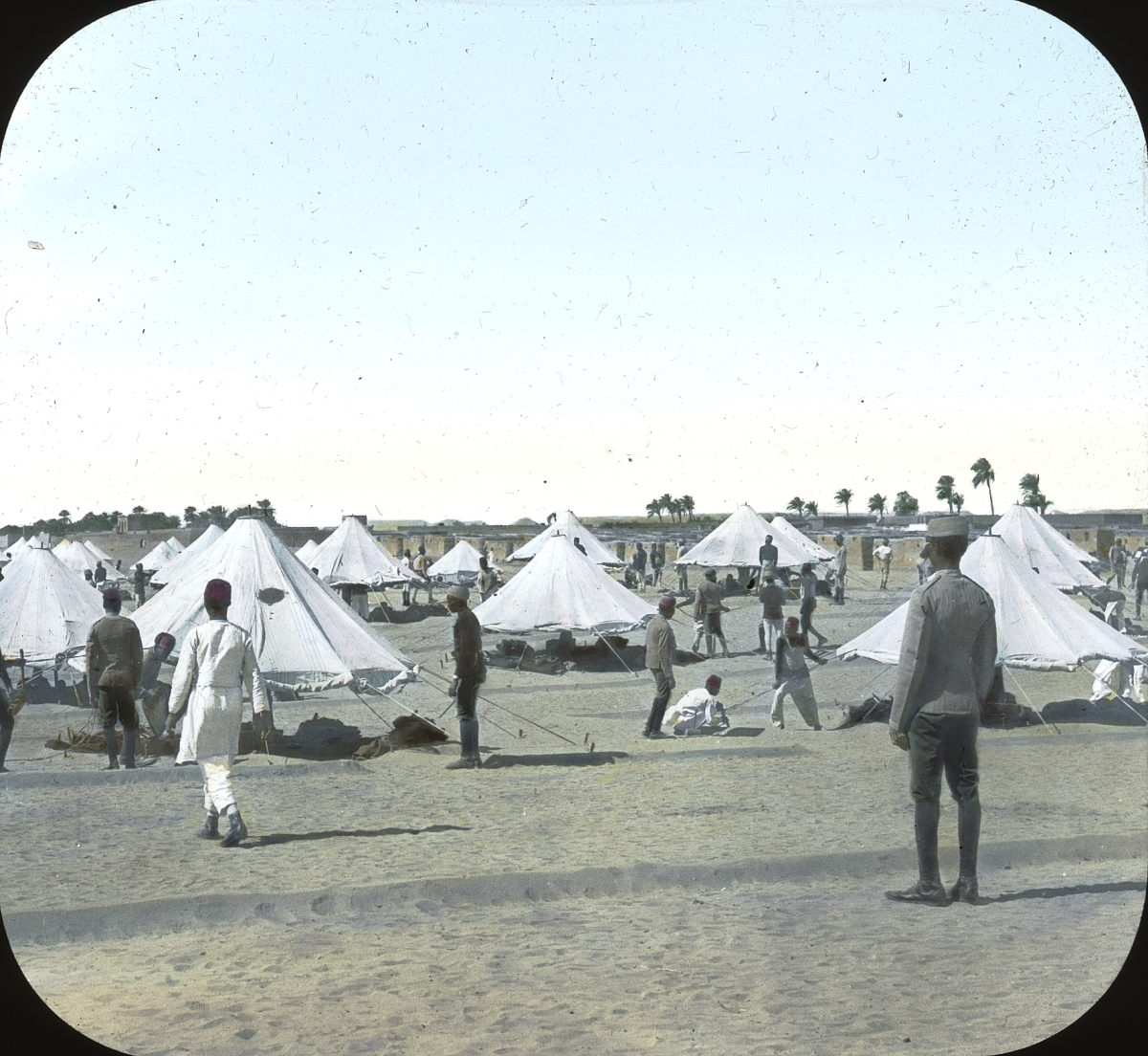
Egypt - military camp, Wadi Halfa. Brooklyn Museum Archives

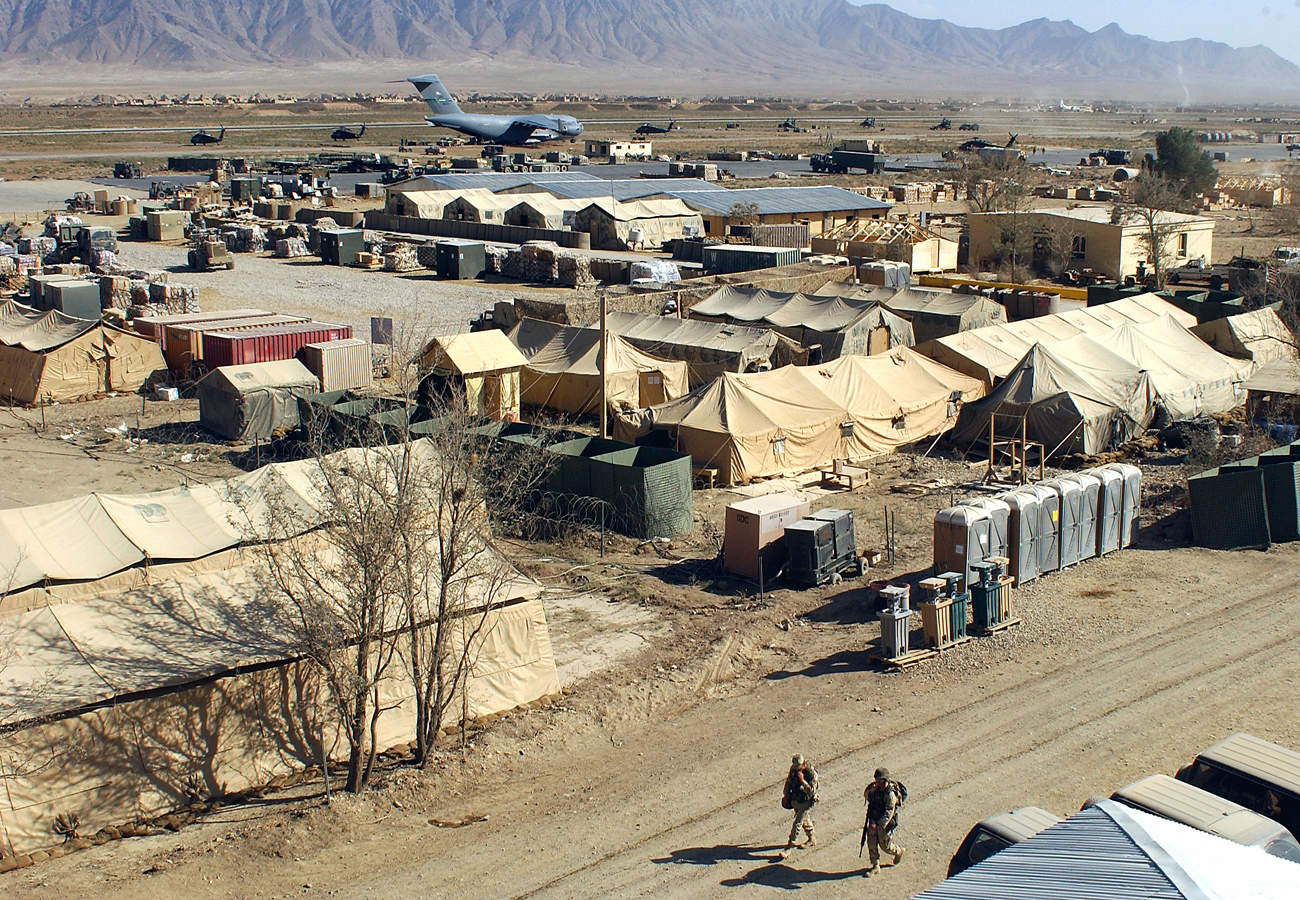
Military camp at Bagram, Afghanistan home to U.S. airmen, soldiers, Marines and sailors supporting Operation Enduring Freedom

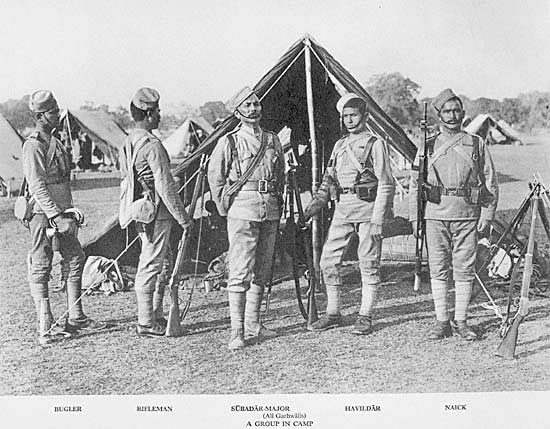
A group in camp, 39th Bengal Infantry

== See also ==
- Bivouac shelter
- Cantonment
- Castra
- Force Provider
- Wagon fort
- Wagluhe

== Bibliography ==
- TM 30-410 Handbook on the British army : with supplements on the Royal Air Force and civilian defense organizations. 1942.
