= Farewell of Napoleon and Alexander after the Peace of Tilsit =

Painting by Gioacchino Giuseppe Serangeli

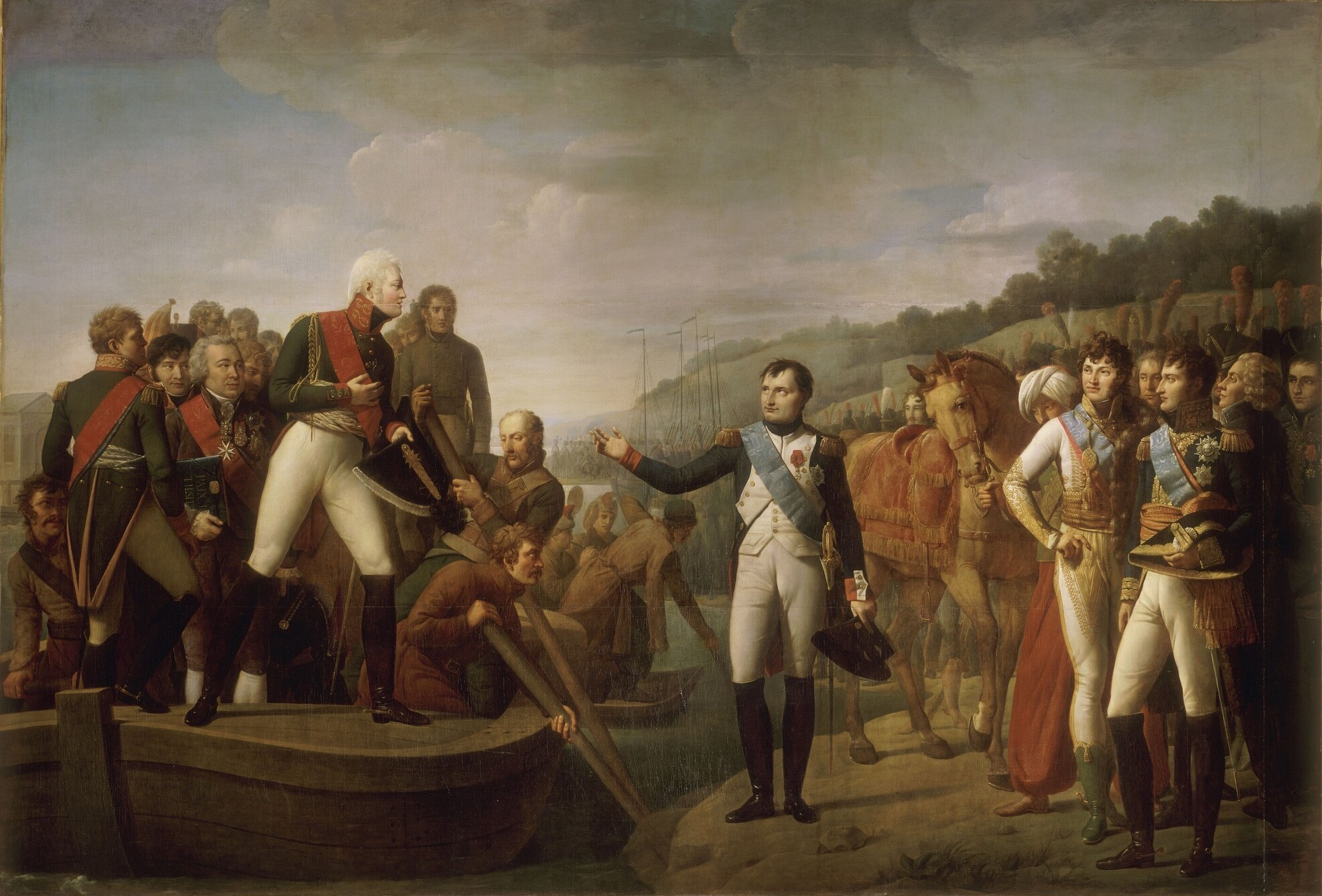
- Artist: Gioacchino Giuseppe Serangeli
- Year: 1810
- Type: Oil on canvas, history painting
- Dimensions: 351 cm × 510 cm (138 in × 200 in)
- Location: Palace of Versailles, Versailles

Farewell of Napoleon and Alexander after the Peace of Tilsit (French: Adieux de Napoléon et d'Alexandre après la paix de Tilsitt) is an oil on canvas history painting by the Italian artist Gioacchino Giuseppe Serangeli, from 1810.

== History and description ==
It depicts Napoleon, Emperor of France bidding farewell to the Russian ruler Alexander I on 9 July 1807 following the agreement of the Peace of Tilsit.

Napoleon having first met Alexander on a raft in the middle of the Neman on 25 June, the two men had struck up a close bond. They negotiated the end of the War of the Fourth Coalition in which Napoleon had decisively defeat Russia and its Prussian allies. Alexander agreed to join Napoleon's Continental System directed at France's principal enemy Britain.

Also included in the painting are the French foreign minister Charles Maurice de Talleyrand-Périgord and Joachim Murat, Napoleon's brother-in-law and a noted cavalry commander. It was exhibited at the Salon of 1810 in Paris. Today it is in the collection of the Palace of Versailles.

== See also ==
- The Meeting of Napoleon I and Tsar Alexander I at Tilsit, 1808 painting by Adolphe Roehn

== Bibliography ==
- Casali, Dimitri & Chanteranne, David. Napoléon par les peintres. Seuil, 2009.
- Cantarel-Besson, Yveline, Constans, Claire & Foucart, Bruno. Napoléon: images et histoire : peintures du Château de Versailles, 1789-1815. Réunion des musées nationaux, 2001.
- Lentz, Thierry & Bruley, Yves. Diplomaties au temps de Napoléon. CNRS editions, 2014.
