= The Meeting of Napoleon I and Tsar Alexander I at Tilsit =

Painting by Adolphe Roehn

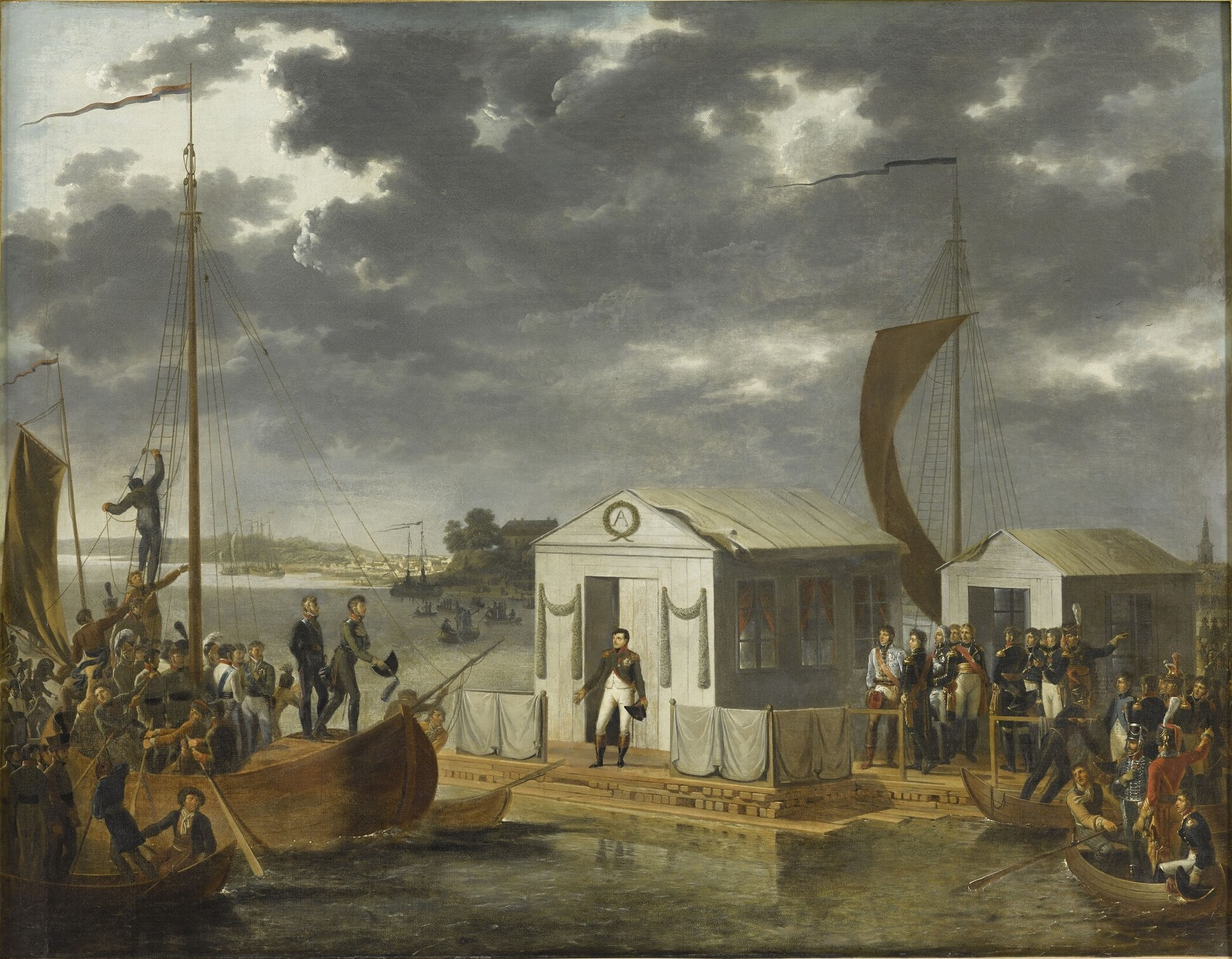
- Artist: Adolphe Roehn
- Year: 1808
- Type: Oil on canvas, history painting
- Dimensions: 125 cm × 152 cm (49 in × 60 in)
- Location: Palace of Versailles, Versailles

The Meeting of Napoleon I and Tsar Alexander I at Tilsit (French: Entrevue de Napoléon Ier et d'Alexandre Ier sur le Niemen. 25 juin 1807) is an 1808 history painting by the French artist Adolphe Roehn. It depicts the scene on 25 June 1807 when Napoleon met with Alexander I of Russia on a raft in the middle of the River Neman. They began the negotiations that led to the Peace of Tilsit, ending the War of the Fourth Coalition. Conspicuously absent were the Prussians, Alexander's allies, who Napoleon relegated to a minor role in the proceedings despite the fact that Tilsit was in East Prussia. Although in reality the meeting was choreographed so that the two rulers arrived on the raft at the same time, the painting shows Napoleon waiting for the Russian in a position of ascendency.

Besides the two emperors, other figures depicted include Marshal Murat, Marshal Berthier, Marshal Ney and Grand Duke Konstantin. The painting was displayed at the Salon of 1808 in Paris. It is today in the collection of the Palace of Versailles.

== See also ==
- Farewell of Napoleon and Alexander after the Peace of Tilsit, 1810 painting by Gioacchino Giuseppe Serangeli

== Bibliography ==
- Dwyer, Philip. Citizen Emperor: Napoleon in Power. Yale University Press, 2013.
- Franceschi, Michel & Weider, Ben. Wars Against Napoleon: Debunking the Myth of the Napoleonic Wars. Savas Beatie, 2008.
- Lentz, Thierry & Bruley, Yves. Diplomaties au temps de Napoléon. CNRS editions, 2014.
- Palmer, Alan. Alexander I: Tsar of War and Peace. Weidenfeld & Nicolson, 1974.
- Roberts, Andrew. Napoleon the Great. Penguin UK, 2014.
