= Treaties of Tilsit =

1807 treaties between France, Russia, and Prussia

Coordinates: 55°05′27″N 21°53′13″E

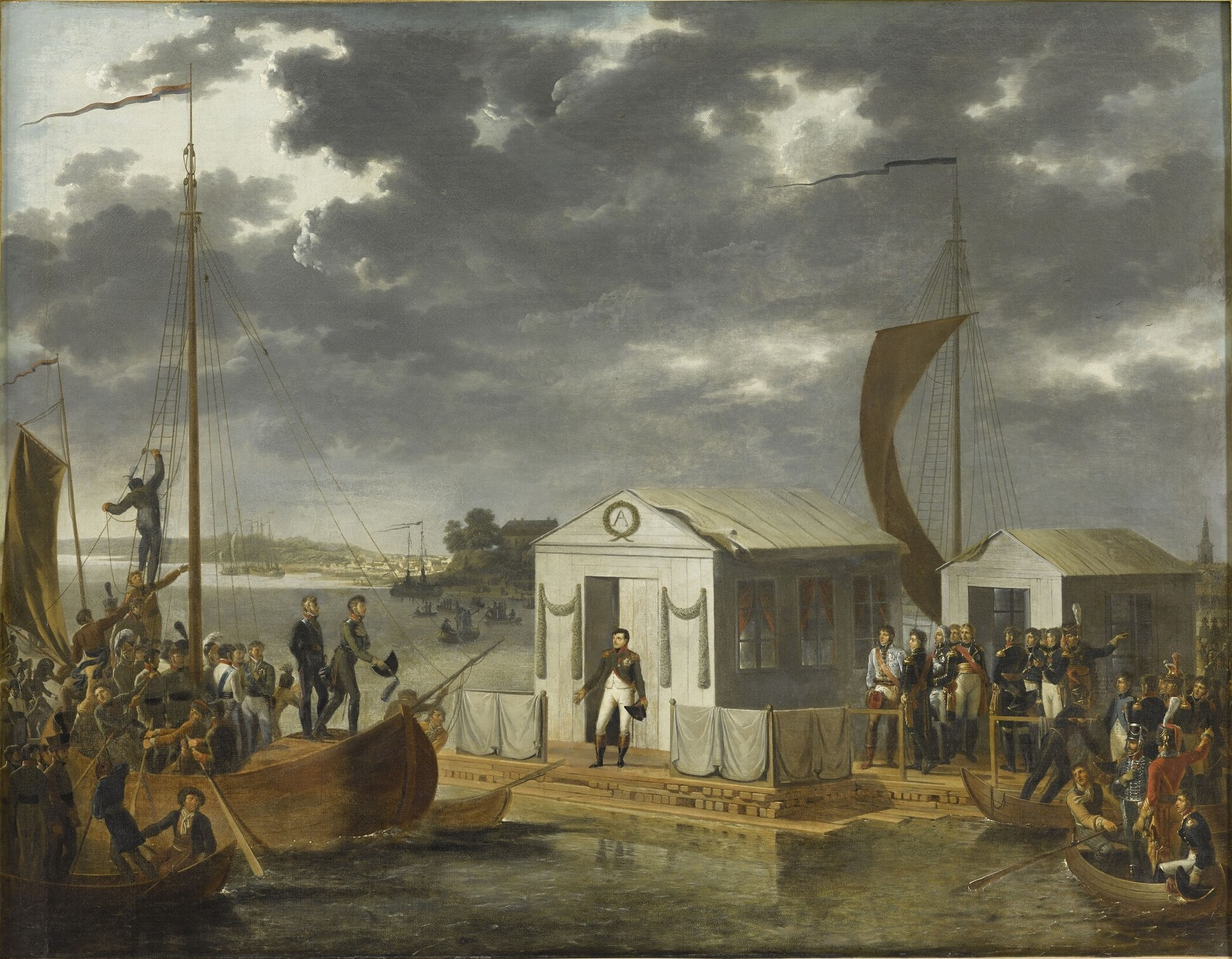
The Meeting of Napoleon I and Tsar Alexander I at Tilsit, by Adolphe Roehn, 1808

The Treaties of Tilsit (French: Traités de Tilsit), also collectively known as the Peace of Tilsit (German: Friede von Tilsit; Russian: Тильзитский мир, romanized: Tilzitski mir), were two peace treaties signed by French Emperor Napoleon in the town of Tilsit (today Sovetsk, Russia) in July 1807 in the aftermath of his victory at Friedland, at the end of the War of the Fourth Coalition. The first was signed on 7 July, between Napoleon and Russian Emperor Alexander I, when they met on a raft in the middle of the Neman river. The second was signed with Prussia on 9 July. The treaties were made at the expense of King Frederick William III of Prussia, who had already agreed to a truce on 25 June after the Grande Armée had captured Berlin and pursued him to the easternmost frontier of his realm.

In Tilsit, Prussia ceded about half of its pre-war territories. From these territories, Napoleon had created French client states, which were formalised and recognised at Tilsit: the Kingdom of Westphalia, the Duchy of Warsaw and the Free City of Danzig; the other ceded territories were awarded to existing French client states and to Russia.

Napoleon not only cemented his control of Central Europe but also had Russia and the truncated Prussia ally with him against his two remaining enemies, the United Kingdom and Sweden, triggering the Anglo-Russian and Finnish wars. Tilsit also freed French forces for the Peninsular War.

Central Europe became a battlefield again in 1809 when Austria engaged France in the War of the Fifth Coalition and in 1812, Napoleon started the invasion of Russia in June 1812.

== Franco-Russian treaty (7 July) ==
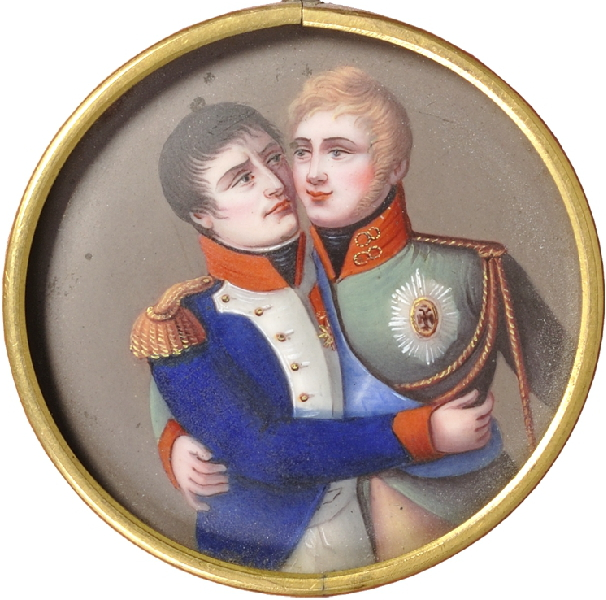
A French medallion dating from the post-Tilsit period. It shows the French and Russian emperors embracing each other.

The treaty ended the war between Imperial Russia and the French Empire and began an alliance between the two empires that rendered the rest of continental Europe almost powerless. The two countries secretly agreed to aid each other in disputes. France pledged to aid Russia against the Ottoman Empire while Russia agreed to join the Continental System against the British Empire. Napoleon also convinced Alexander I to enter into the Anglo-Russian War and to instigate the Finnish War against Sweden to force Sweden to join the Continental System. More specifically, the Tsar agreed to evacuate Wallachia and Moldavia, which had been occupied by Russian forces as part of the Russo-Turkish War, 1806–1812. The Ionian Islands and Cattaro (Kotor), which had been captured by Russian admirals Fyodor Ushakov and Dmitry Senyavin, were to be handed over to the French. In recompense, Napoleon guaranteed the sovereignty of the Duchy of Oldenburg and several other small states ruled by the Tsar's German relatives.

The decision to meet on a raft on the Neman was the expression of the perfect equality of both emperors. Monarchs, princes, generals – recently desperate enemies became literally friends. One part of Tilsit was occupied by a battalion of Russian Guardsmen, the other by a French Guard battalion. A richly caparisoned Arabian horse was prepared for Alexander, and he rode along the ranks of French Guardsmen, frozen with their rifles at attention. Alexander, a superb horseman, sat his horse impeccably and responded to the military salutes with a gracious smile, saluting the battalions frozen at attention with his sword. To demonstrate the extent to which both sides respected each other, Napoleon gave orders that the following words would be the daily password, response, and slogan of the French Guard the following day: "Alexander, Russia, Greatness", while the Russian Guard was given the password "Napoleon, France, Prowess".

The city was declared neutral. Russian officers disguised themselves as civilians to come to Tilsit and see Napoleon, where only select individuals were allowed among the military. The French Guards hosted a grand banquet and invited Russian Guards soldiers: the Preobrazhensky, Semyonovsky, and Izmailovsky regiments. On a plain near the city, a huge square of tables had been erected, with a band playing marches in the centre. The tables were laden with delicacies. The soldiers sat mingled—Russians and French. At the height of this banquet, the emperors themselves visited the merry soldiers. Napoleon, gazing with pleasure upon the soldiers' feast, said to his guardsmen: "Grenadiers, what you have done is wonderful!" The feast became even more joyful and riotous when the emperors left. The soldiers of both armies fraternised and ended up exchanging uniforms and marching through the city shouting "Long live the emperors!" in Russian and French.

== Franco-Prussian treaty (9 July) ==
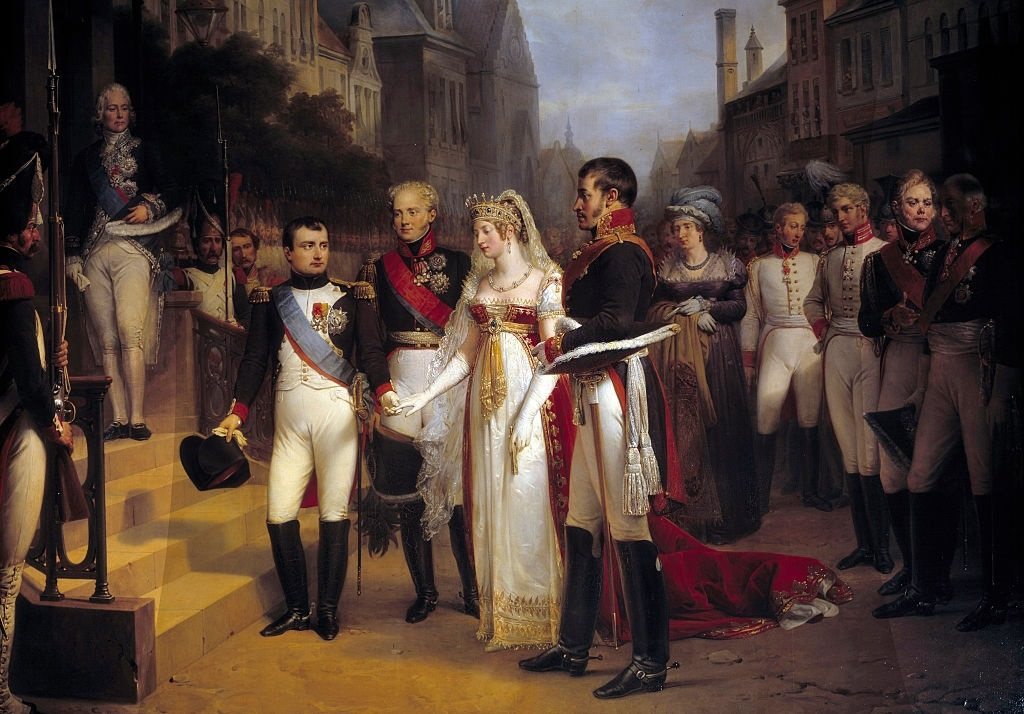
Napoleon, Alexander I of Russia, Queen Louise of Prussia, and Frederick William III in Tilsit

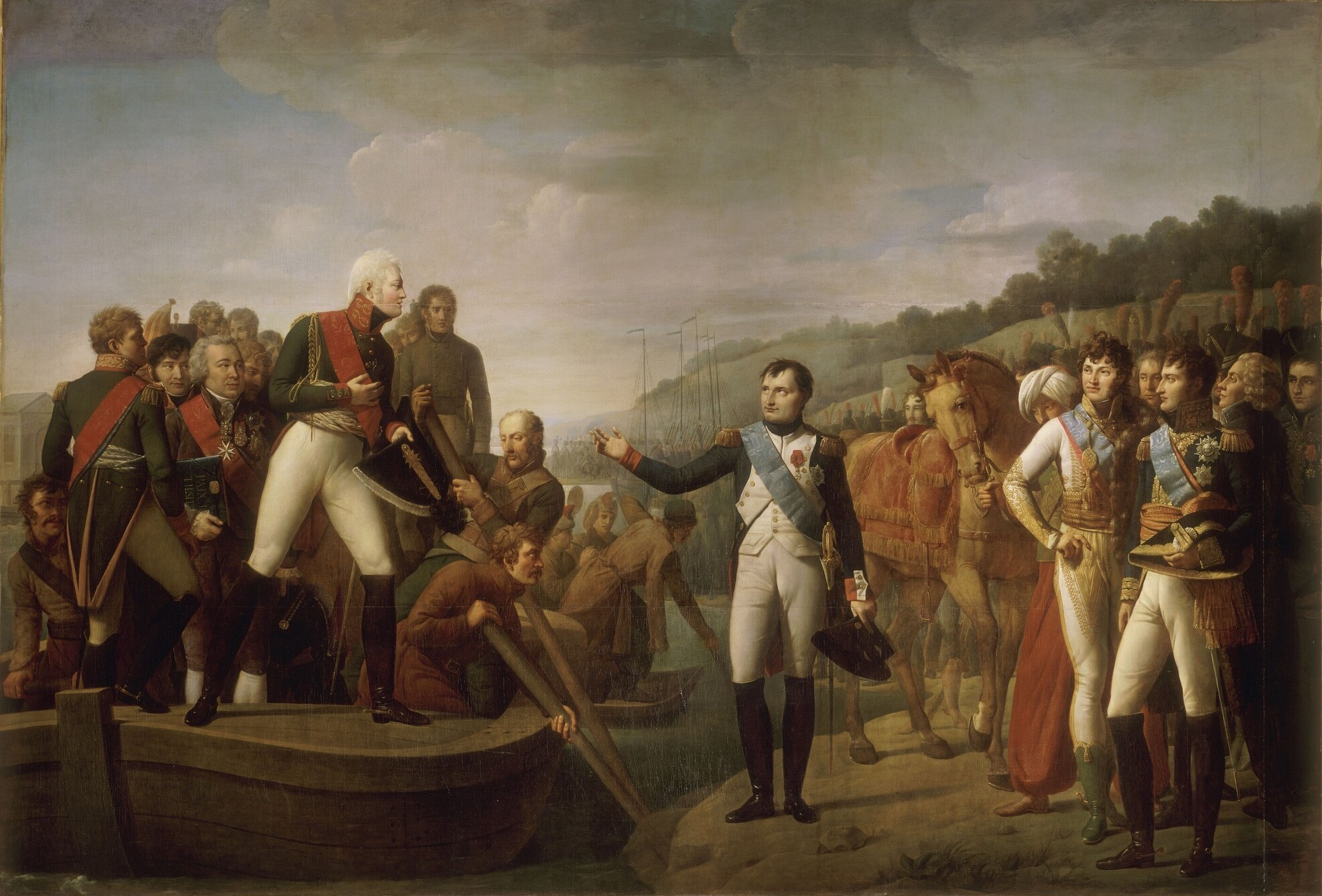
Farewell of Napoleon and Alexander after the Peace of Tilsit by Gioacchino Giuseppe Serangeli

The treaty with Prussia stripped the country of about half its territory: Cottbus passed to Saxony, the left bank of the Elbe was awarded to the newly created Kingdom of Westphalia, Białystok was given to Russia (which led to the creation of the Belostok Oblast), and most of the Polish lands in Prussian possession since the Second and Third Partitions became the quasi-independent Duchy of Warsaw. Prussia was to reduce the army to 43,000 and on 9 March 1808, France fixed its tribute to be levied from Prussia at 154,500,000 francs (= Prussian dollar 41.73 mio.), deducting 53,500,000, which had been raised so far during the ongoing French occupation. The sum was lowered in two steps to 120 million francs by 1 November 1808.

Talleyrand had advised Napoleon to pursue milder terms; the treaties marked an important stage in his estrangement from the emperor. Until 1812, the French occupants requisitioned in money and kind from various corporations and persons, especially by billetting soldiers on cities, further contributions additionally amounting to between 146 and 309 million francs, according to different calculations. The Prussian government indebtedness soared between 1806 and 1815 by thaler 200 million to altogether 180.09 million interest-bearing debts, 11.24 million non-interest-bearing unconsolidated treasury notes and another 25.9 million former provincial debts assumed by the royal government. The cities' debts, especially those of Berlin often billetted on, were not assumed by the Prussian government. Since the creditors deemed Prussia to be over-indebted in 1817, the 4% state bonds were traded at the bourses with a disagio of 27 to 29%, in 1818 even with a discount of 35%, causing the effective interest to rise to 6.15%. At the restructuring part of the debts in 1818 by a £5 million loan (= thaler 30 million) at 5% at the London financial market, the Prussian government had to accept a disagio of 28⅓%, thus paying an annual effective rate of 6.98%.

When the Treaty was being formulated, it was noted by an observer that the Prussian king was pacing on the bank of the Neman river; Napoleon had to "but raise his hand, and Prussia would cease to exist" (McKay). Hence, many observers in Prussia and Russia viewed the treaty as unequal and as a national humiliation. The Russian soldiers refused to follow Napoleon's commands, as the Lisbon Incident demonstrated to all of Europe. Napoleon's plans to marry the tsar's sister were stymied by Russian royalty. Cooperation between Russia and France eventually broke down in 1810 when the tsar began to allow neutral ships to land in Russian ports. In June 1812, Napoleon crossed the Neman river and invaded Russia, ending any vestige of alliance.

=== Territorial and population losses suffered by Prussia ===
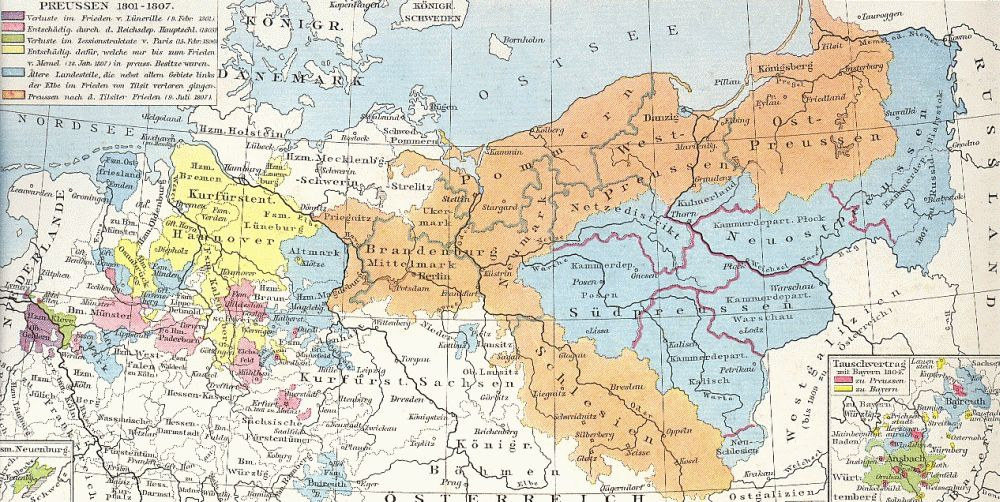
Prussia in 1807 (orange) and its territories lost at Tilsit (other colours).

The Prussian state was diminished by more than half under the terms of the Treaties of Tilsit, from 5,700 square miles to 2,800 square miles. Compared to the 9.75 million inhabitants Prussia had prior to the Treaties of Tilsit, no more than 4.5 million inhabitants remained within the new boundaries of the Prussian state.

The state revenue, which formerly amounted to forty million dollars per year, was decreased in an even greater proportion. The ceded provinces were rich and fertile, and many millions had been spent on their improvement. Almost all that Prussia had gained by the partitions of Poland (1772–1795) was taken away from Prussia. The Kingdom of Saxony, a former confederate of Prussia, was the recipient of the provinces. Russia, the more powerful of its erstwhile allies, gained territory with a population of 200,000 inhabitants. The following is a tabulation of the territorial and population losses that Prussia sustained, but not accounting for the Prussian acquisitions since 1772, under the terms of the Tilsit Treaties:

| Westphalian possessions | Prussian sq. miles | Inhabitants |
|---|---|---|
| County of Mark, with Essen, Werden, and Lippstadt, | 51 =2,893.65 km^{2} (1,117.24 sq mi) | 148,000 |
| Principality of Minden, | 18.5 =1,049.66 km^{2} (405.28 sq mi) | 70,363 |
| County of Ravensberg, | 16.5 =936.18 km^{2} (361.46 sq mi) | 89,938 |
| Lingen and Tecklenburg, | 13 =737.6 km^{2} (284.8 sq mi) | 46,000 |
| Cleve, on the eastern side of the Rhine, | 20.5 =1,163.14 km^{2} (449.09 sq mi) | 54,000 |
| Principality of East Frisia, | 56.5 =3,205.71 km^{2} (1,237.73 sq mi) | 119,500 |
| Principality of Münster, | 49 =2,718.18 km^{2} (1,049.50 sq mi) | 127,000 |
| Principality of Paderborn, | 30 =1,702.15 km^{2} (657.20 sq mi) | 98,500 |
| Lower Saxon possessions | Prussian sq. miles | Inhabitants |
| Magdeburg, with that part of the duchy on the left bank of the Elbe, Halle, &c. | 54 =3,063.87 km^{2} (1,182.97 sq mi) | 160,000 |
| County of Mansfeld, | 1.0 =56.74 km^{2} (21.91 sq mi) | 27,000 |
| Principality of Halberstadt, | 26.5 =1,503.57 km^{2} (580.53 sq mi) | 101,000 |
| County of Hohenstein, | 8.5 =482.28 km^{2} (186.21 sq mi) | 27,000 |
| Territory of Quedlinburg, | 1.5 =85.11 km^{2} (32.86 sq mi) | 13,400 |
| Principality of Hildesheim and Goslar. | 40 =2,269.53 km^{2} (876.27 sq mi) | 114,000 |

== Aftermath ==
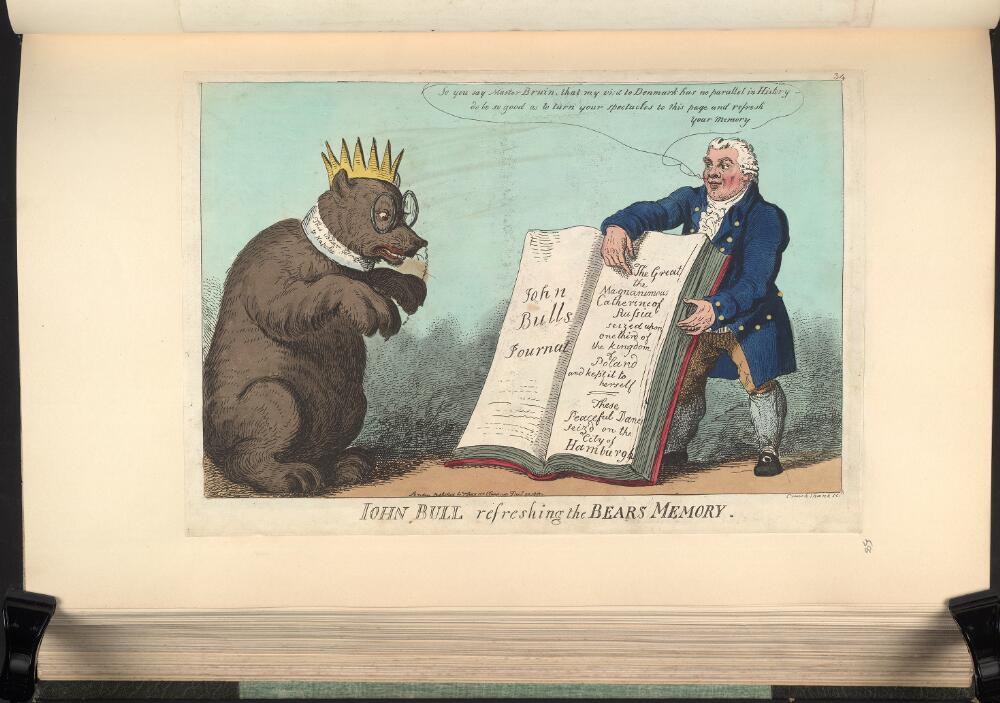
A cartoon by Isaac Cruikshank showing John Bull refreshing the Russian Bear's memory

The War of the Fourth Coalition was over. The Peninsular War began on 19 November 1807, and the War of the Fifth Coalition began in 1809.

The Neman was crossed at the outset of the 1812 French invasion of Russia.

Following the end of the Napoleonic Wars in 1815, the Congress of Vienna would restore many Prussian territories.

By signing these treaties, France left Persia and the Ottomans, who had previously hoped for France's help under treaties with France (including Finckenstein), in the face of Russian aggression, and established the loss of parts of Persia in the Caucasus, such as the present-day countries Azerbaijan, Georgia and Armenia.
