= Auguste Vinchon =

French painter

Auguste Jean Baptiste Vinchon
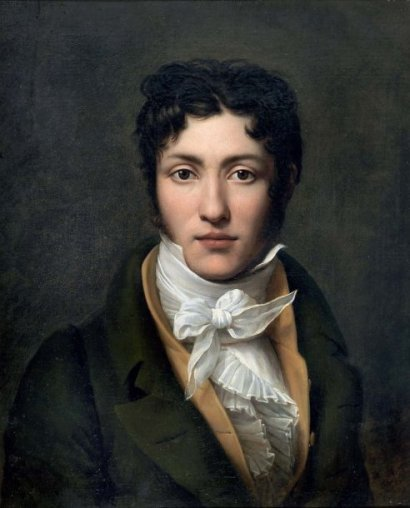
- Self-portrait
- Born: 5 August 1789; Paris, France
- Died: 1855; Ems, Duchy of Nassau
- Occupation: Painter
- Known for: Boissy standing up to the mob

Jean Baptiste Auguste Vinchon (5 August 1789 – 1855) was a French painter.

== Empire ==
Jean-Baptiste-Auguste Vinchon was born in Paris on 5 August 1789. He became a painter of historical subjects, and a printer. Vinchon was a pupil of Gioacchino Giuseppe Serangeli in his Paris studio.

He won the second Prix de Rome for painting in 1813 and the first Prix de Rome in 1814 for his painting of Diagoras Carried in Triumph by His Sons.

During the First French Empire (1804–14) Vinchon and Nicolas Gosse painted a number of Scenes from Ancient Life in grey scale for the Louvre, based on the plates of Antichità di Ercolano.

== Bourbon Restoration ==
In 1816–17 the Comte de Blacas arranged for the church of Santissima Trinità dei Monti, beside the Villa Medici, to be renovated and redecorated. Former and current winners of the Prix de Rome were commissioned to undertake the work, including Vichon, Jean-Auguste-Dominique Ingres, Henri-Joseph de Forestier, Léon Pallière, François-Édouard Picot, Jean Alaux and Jean-Baptiste Thomas.

In 1822 Vinchon painted frescoes for a chapel at the church of Saint-Sulpice, Paris.

During the Bourbon Restoration (1815–1830) and July Monarchy (1830–1848) Vinchon would be considered one of the juste milieu artists, who also included Désiré Court, Horace Vernet, Charles-Émile-Callande de Champmartin and Ary Scheffer. This school steered a middle way between classicists such as Auguste Couder and romantics such as Eugène Delacroix. In 1827 Vinchon was appointed a Knight of the Legion of Honor.

After the July Revolution, on 30 September 1830 François Guizot, the Minister of the Interior, initiated three competitions for paintings for the meeting room of the new chamber of deputies. Each of the paintings was to represent the duties of the deputy to resist tyranny and resist sedition. Three subjects were defined: The Oath of Louis-Philippe in the Chamber of Deputies in August 1830; the Protest by Mirabeau against the orders of Louis XVI communicated to the States General by the marquis de Dreux-Brézé; and François Antoine de Boissy d'Anglas standing up to the mob.

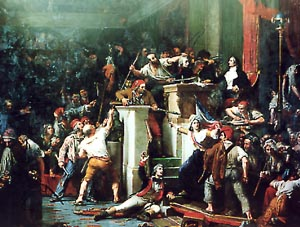
François Antoine de Boissy d'Anglas standing up to the mob (detail; 1830)

Vinchon won the competition for the third subject with his painting. This depicted an incident on 20 May 1795 when the mob broke into the National Convention, killed one of the deputies, and presented his head to Boissy on the end of a pike. Boissy saluted his comrade and retained his seat, saving the day and damaging the populist movement of the revolution. Vinchon's painting represents the agitators as ferocious, crazed and moronic. At the left of the picture agents are shown bribing one of the rioters. A copy of the painting decorated one wall of the Hôtel de Ville of Paris for several years, but was burned during the fire of 1871.

In 1848 Vinchon painted Louis Philippe I with his company visiting the Galerie de Pierre in Versailles to see how a statue of Joan of Arc looked by torchlight. The painting is now held by the Musée National in Versailles.

== Last years ==
Vinchon became head of one of the leading printing houses in Paris, Impr. de Vinchon et C. de Mourgues. He died at the bathing resort of Ems, in the Duchy of Nassau, in 1855. His body was brought back to Paris to be inhumed in his family tomb. He was buried on 23 August 1855. Camille Doucet spoke at his funeral, as did the foreman and the cashier of the printing house. He was aged sixty-nine. He is buried in the Père Lachaise Cemetery in Paris.

== Works ==
Vinchon's works exhibited in the Salon included:

- 1822 Dedication of the young Mazet 11 x 9.6 feet
- 1824 Death of Comola;
- 1824 Joan of Arc on the walls of Orléans 10.6 x 9 feet
- 1827 Old Greek man sitting in the ruins of his burned house
- 1827 Propertius and Cynthia at Tivoli
- 1827 Shepherd near Rome asleep on the ruins of a tomb of emperor
- 1850 Volunteer Enrollment of 1792 A stylized view of an event in the Revolution, depicting an orderly procession of volunteers in neat uniforms
- 1855 Départ des volontaires. This painting sold for 20,000 francs, a huge amount at the time.

Vinchon also painted various frescoes in Rome.

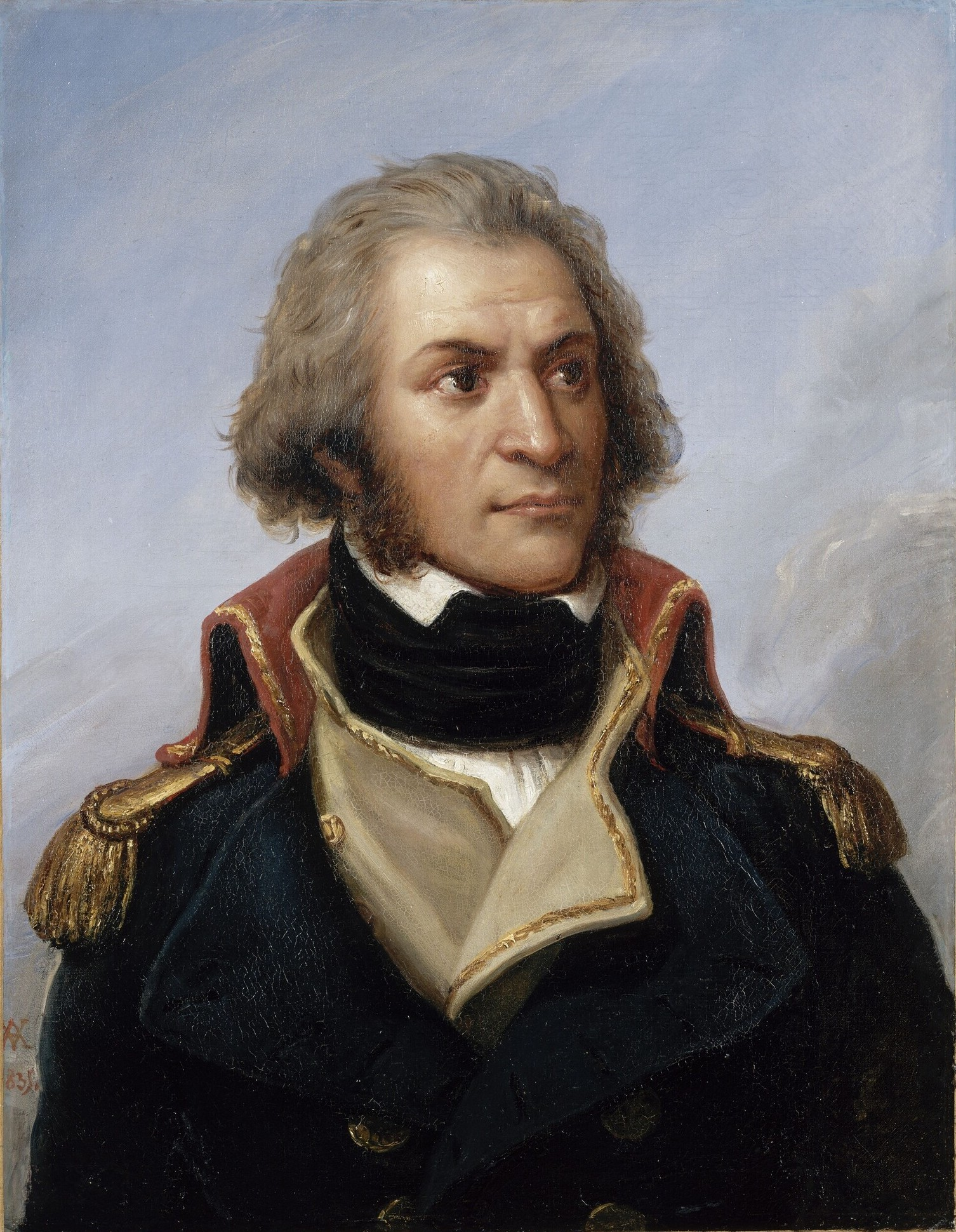
Guillaume-Marie-Anne Brune (1763–1815)

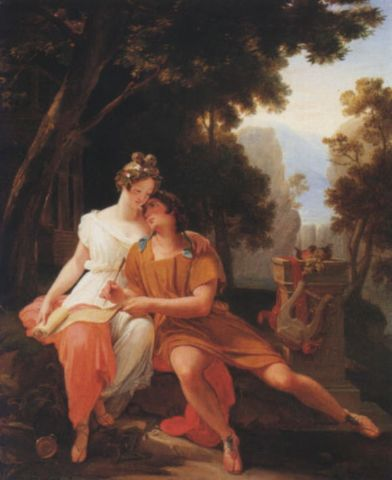
Propertius and Cynthia at Tivoli

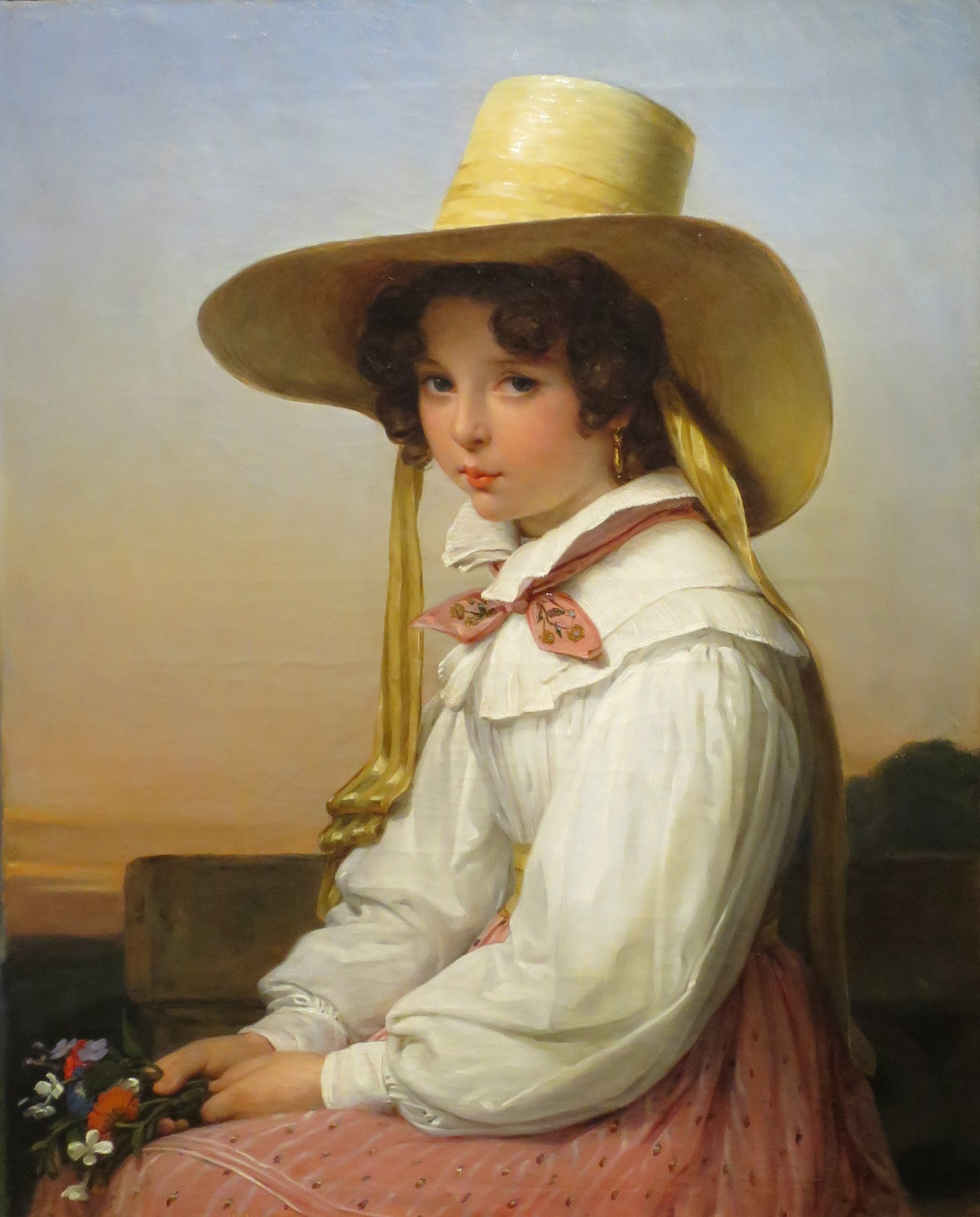
Nency Destouches, 1829

== Sources ==
- Adlam, Carol; Simpson, Juliet (2009-01-01). Critical Exchange: Art Criticism of the Eighteenth and Nineteenth Centuries in Russia and Western Europe. Peter Lang. ISBN 978-3-03911-556-3.
- Blix, Goran (2011-01-01). From Paris to Pompeii: French Romanticism and the Cultural Politics of Archaeology. University of Pennsylvania Press. ISBN 978-0-8122-0130-7.
- Boime, Albert (2004-08-18). Art in an Age of Counterrevolution, 1815-1848. University of Chicago Press. ISBN 978-0-226-06337-9.
- Boime, Albert (2008-09-15). Art in an Age of Civil Struggle, 1848-1871. University of Chicago Press. ISBN 978-0-226-06342-3.
- Boissy d'Anglas, Hélène (2001-11-01). FRANÇOIS ANTOINE DE BOISSY D'ANGLAS: Biographie. Editions L'Harmattan. ISBN 978-2-296-16983-8.
- CéCédille (27 November 2011). "Boissy d'Anglas à la Convention (1er prairial an III)". Diacritiques.
- Champlin, John Denison; Perkins, Charles Callahan (1892). Cyclopedia of Painters and Paintings. C. Scribner's sons. ISBN 9780804605359.
- Gabet, Charles (1834). "Vinchon (Auguste-Jean-Baptiste)". Dictionnaire des artistes de l'école française au XIX°siècle. Archived from the original on 2014-07-14.
- Higonnet, Patrice L. R. (2009-06-30). Paris: Capital of the World. Harvard University Press. ISBN 978-0-674-03864-6.
- Lehning, James R. (2007-07-09). The Melodramatic Thread: Spectacle and Political Culture in Modern France. Indiana University Press. ISBN 978-0-253-11701-4.
- Le Quérard (1856). Le Quérard: archives d'histoire littéraire, de biographie et de bibliographie françaises : complément périodique de la France littéraire. Au Bureau du Journal.
- "Les obseques de M. Auguste Vinchon". 1855.
- Miller, Asher Ethan (2013). The Path of Nature: French Paintings from the Wheelock Whitney Collection, 1785–1850. Metropolitan Museum of Art. ISBN 978-1-58839-484-2.
- Moiroux, Jules (26 November 2012). "Le Cimetière du Père Lachaise". BNF.
- Spector, Jack J. (1990-10-01). The Murals of Eugène Delacroix at Saint-Sulpice. Rutgers University Press. ISBN 978-0-271-00408-2.
