= Jean Alphonse Roehn =

French painter (1799–1864)

- Born: January 31, 1799; Paris, France
- Died: May 10, 1864 (aged 65); Paris, France
- Other names: Alphonse Roehn, Alp. Roehn. fils
- Education: École des Beaux-Arts
- Known for: painting, drawing
- Father: Adolphe Roehn

Jean Alphonse Roehn (January 31, 1799 – May 10, 1864) was a French painter and caricaturist.

His father was painter Adolphe Roehn. In 1813, Jean Alphonse went to study at the École des Beaux Arts, where he studied under Jean-Baptiste Regnault and Antoine-Jean Gros. He started exhibiting painting at the Salon of 1822, and in the Salon of 1827, he won a second class medal. He was also a drawing teacher at the Louis-Legrand School. His painting Le braconnier (The poacher) is in the collection of the Louvre.

In addition to painting, he drew cartoons, including one lampooning the British as uncultured after Napoleon's defeat at Waterloo. That cartoon and others are in the collection of the British Museum.

== Gallery ==
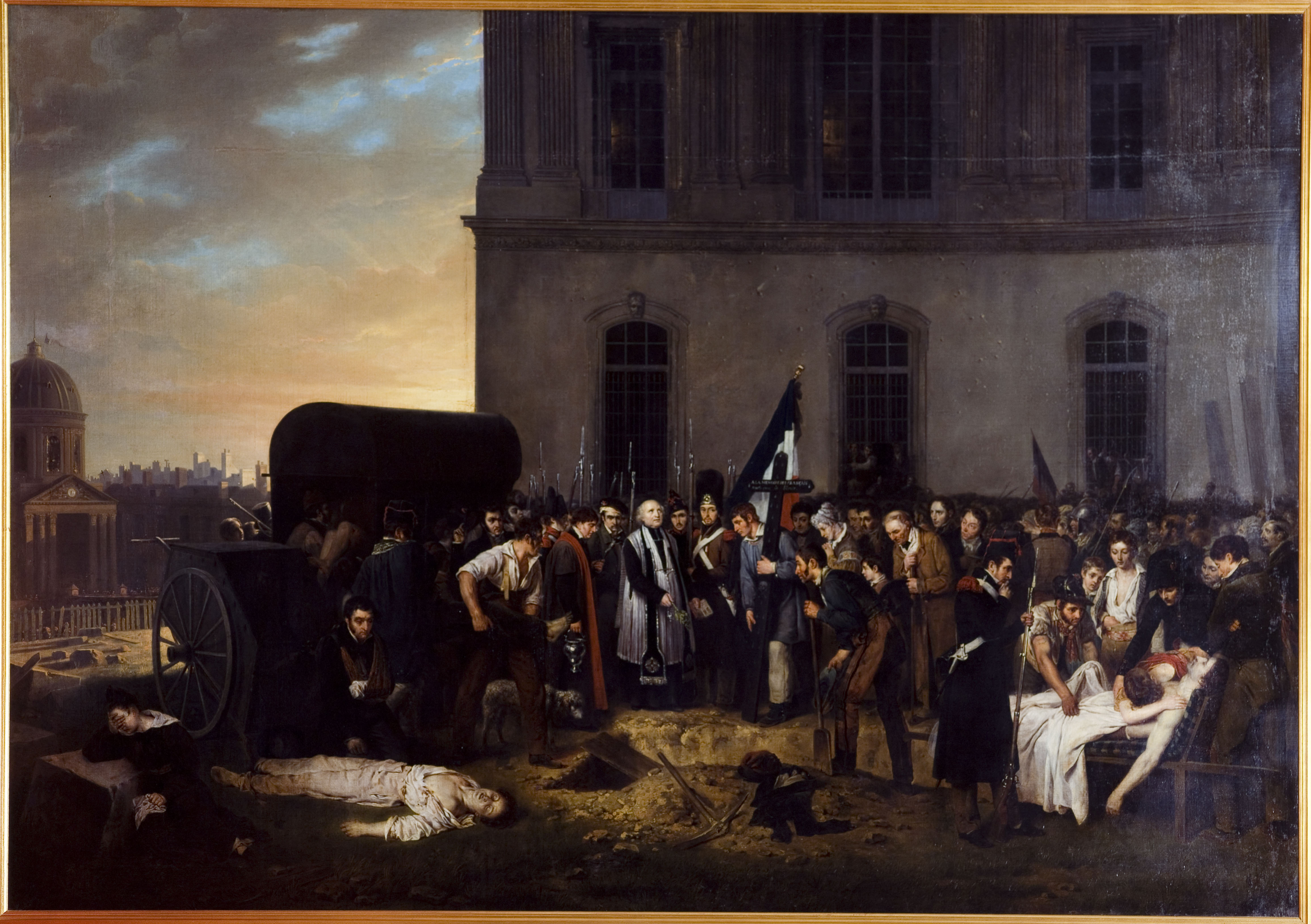
Inhumation provisoire des victimes de Juillet devant la colonnade du Louvre

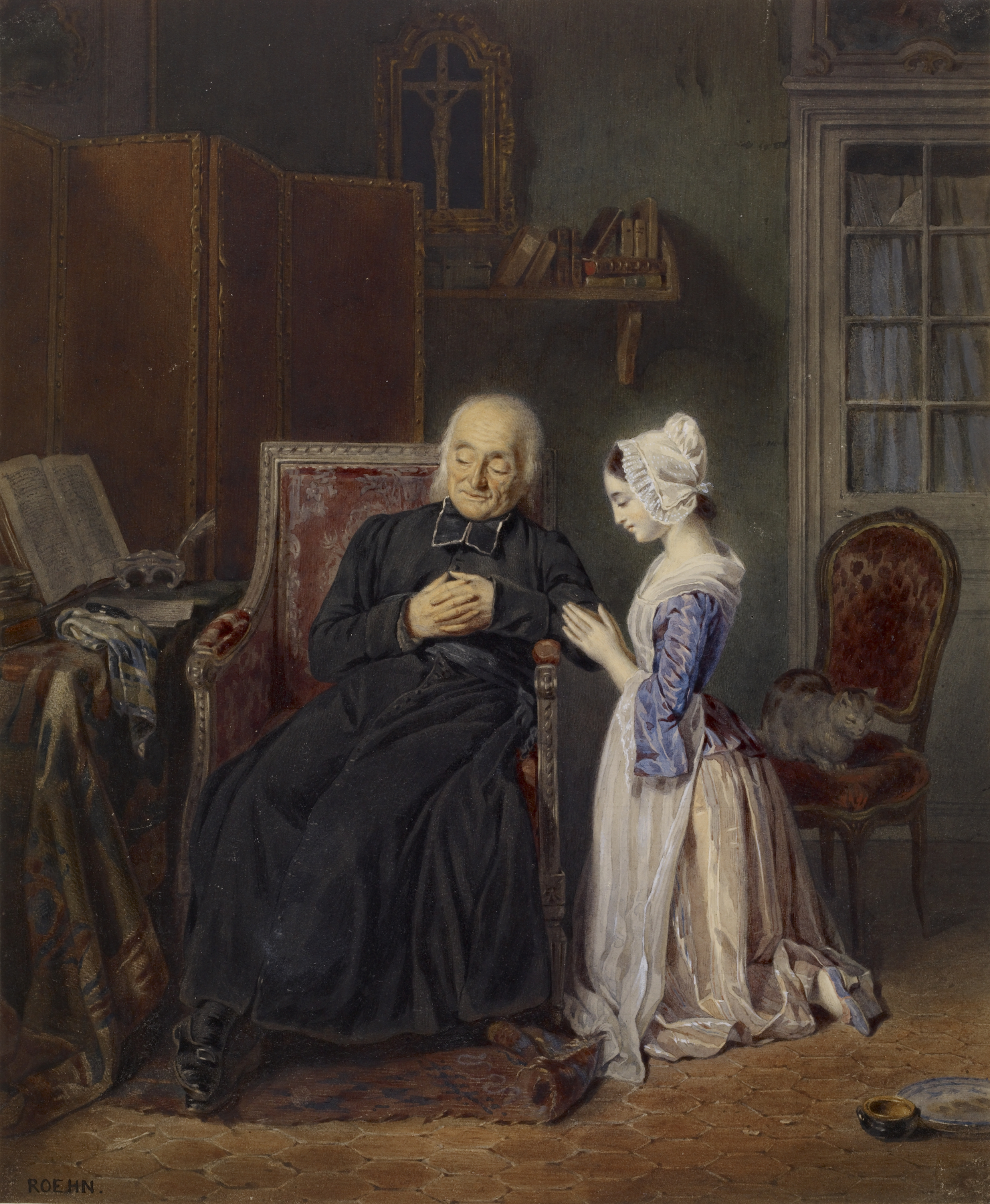
Le Billet de confession

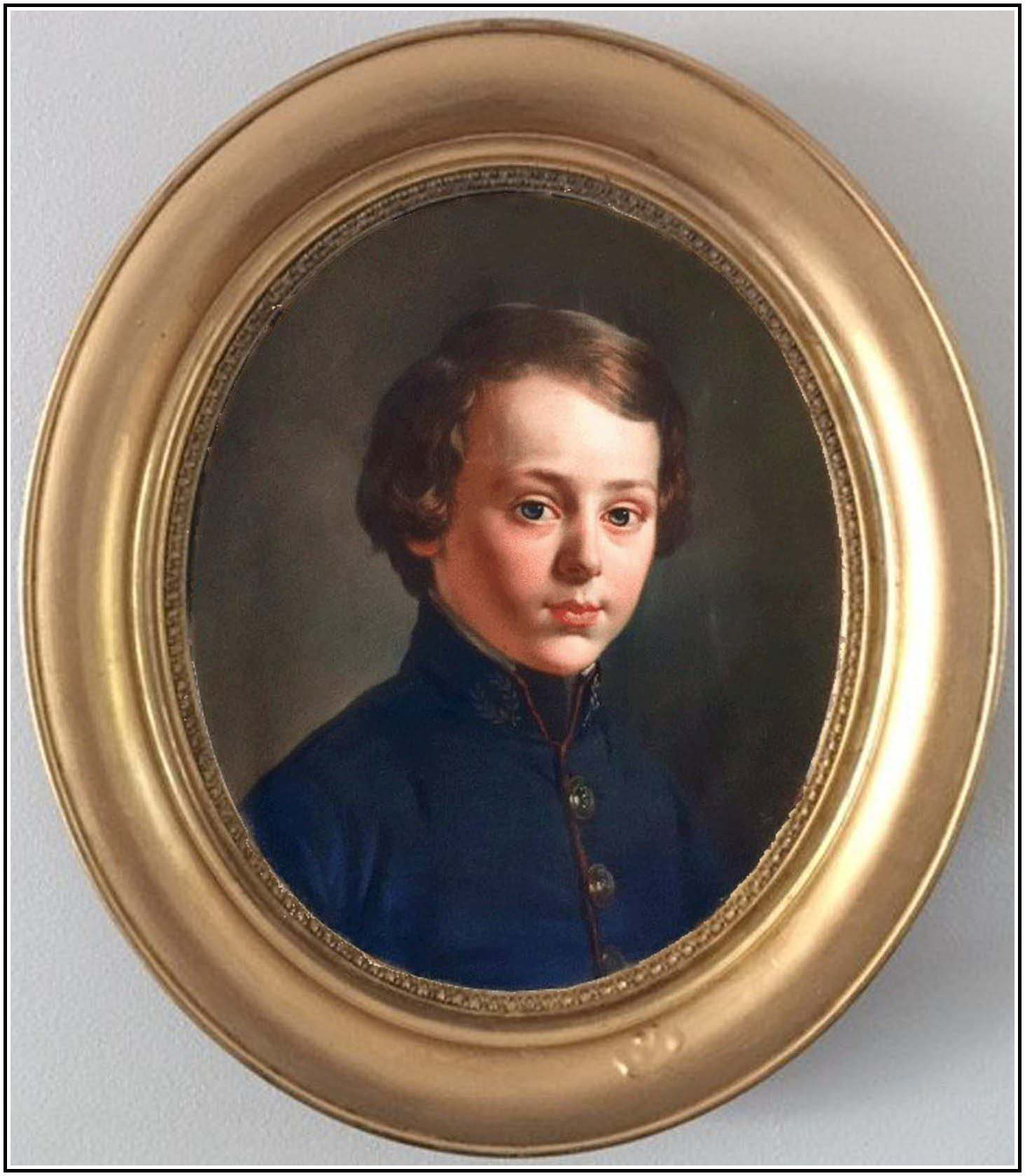
Portrait d'élève polytechnicien.

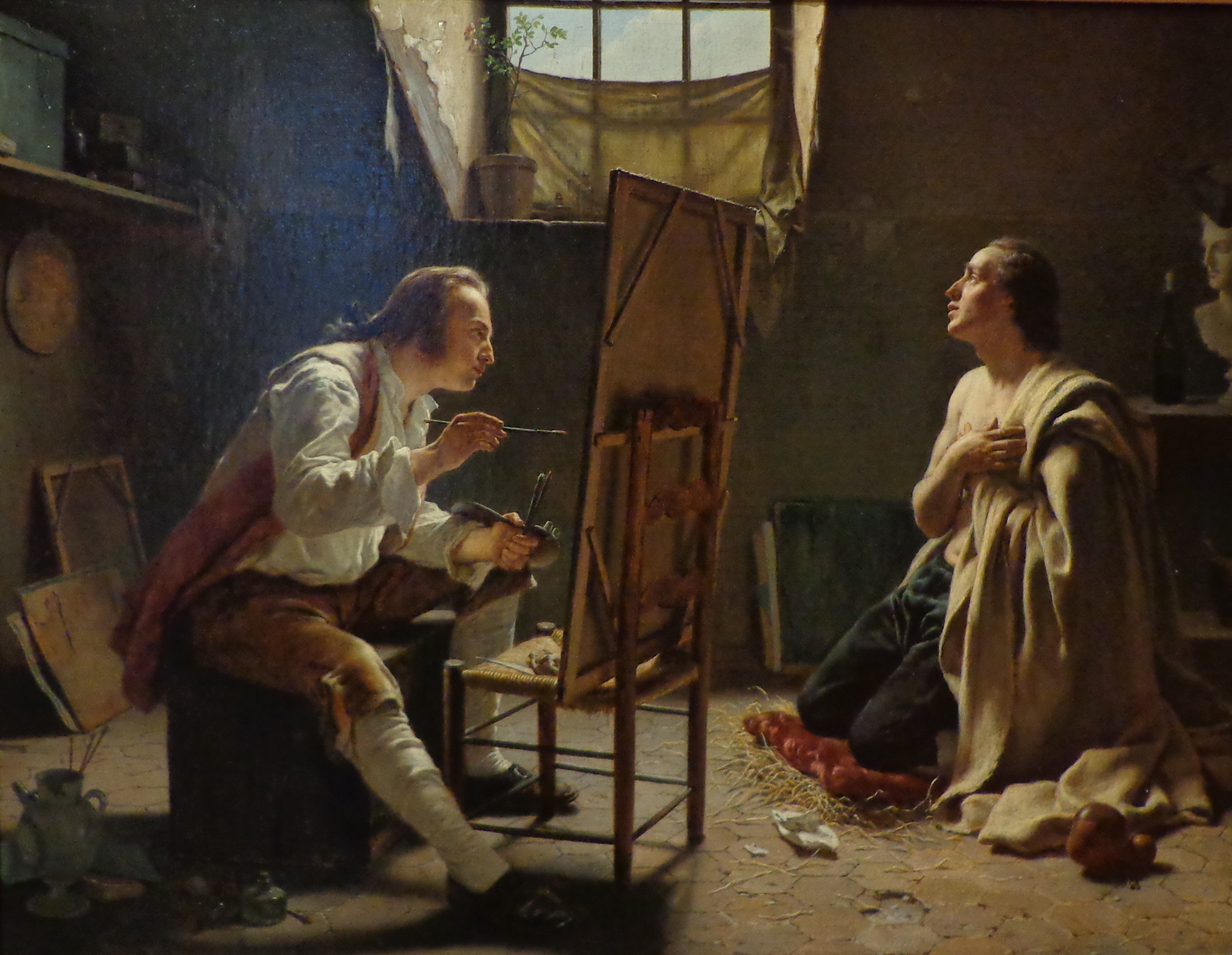
Le Peintre et son modèle

== Bibliography ==
- Philippe Cendron, La seconde vie du 15, quai Voltaire, CoolLibri, 2025 ISBN 9-791043-504099, 32 p.
- Philippe Cendron, Alphonse Roehn. Un peintre au regard tendre et amusé, CoolLibri, 2026 ISBN 9-791043-533372, 56 p.
