= Gioacchino Giuseppe Serangeli =

Roman painter active during the First French Empire

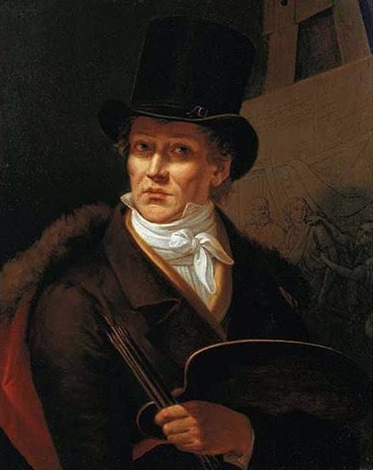
- Self-portrait, 1815
- Born: 1768; Rome, Papal States
- Died: 12 January 1852 (aged 83–84); Turin, Kingdom of Sardinia
- Occupation: Painter
- Known for: Student of Jacques-Louis David

Signature
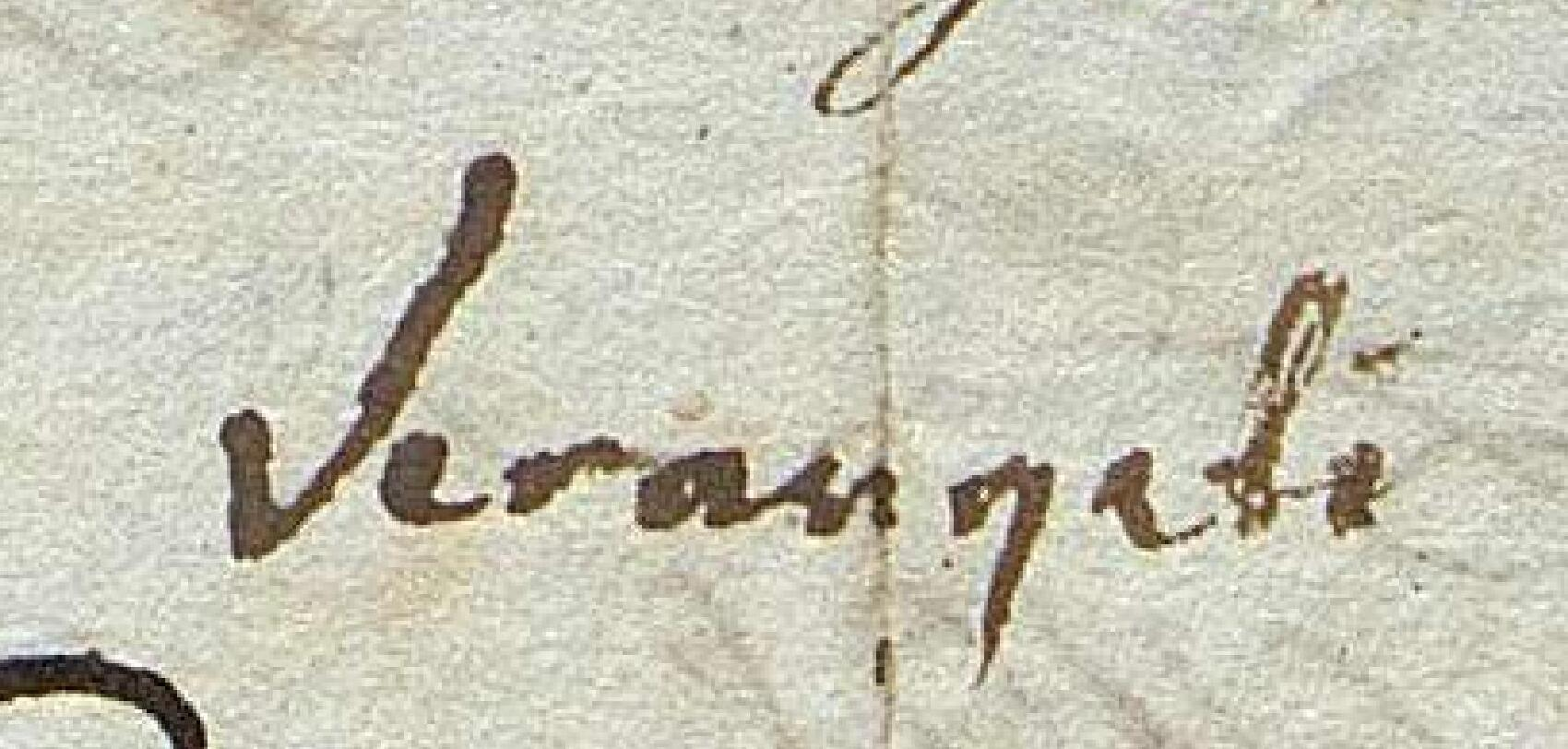

Gioacchino Giuseppe Serangeli (1768 – 12 January 1852) was a Roman painter, a pupil of Jacques-Louis David, who painted in France during the period of the French Revolution and the subsequent First French Empire. For some time he was one of the more fashionable painters of portraits of the new ruling class in France. His more mature paintings, done after his return to Italy, were also well regarded.

== Early years ==
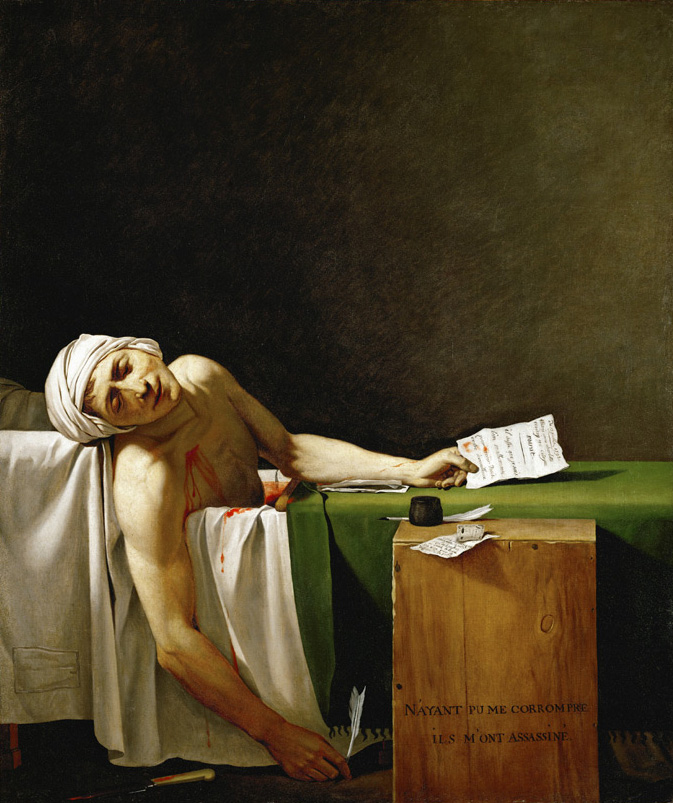
copy of David's The Death of Marat

Gioacchino Giuseppe Serangeli was born in Rome in 1768. He trained as a painter at the Accademia Ambrosiana in Milan, during the period of political turmoil before the French Revolution. He made a visit to Rome before returning to Milan. In 1790 he crossed the Alps to France, where he found a vibrant artistic scene enhanced by the political situation and the rediscovery of classical art, and in which foreigners were welcome. He soon became known, and on 31 December 1790 was invited to participate by the Académie royale de peinture et de sculpture.

== Paris ==
By 1793 Serangeli was working in the studio of Jacques-Louis David as both a student and a friend of the master. At this time he made a copy of David's painting of The Death of Marat, one of the most famous images of the Revolution. François Gérard, who was also working in the studio at the time and was exempt from military service since he was a member of a revolutionary tribunal, made another copy of the same painting. A 1795 painting of a portrait of the children of Seriziat was probably made in 1795 during a visit Serangeli made to David, who had retired to the farm of Saint-Ouen at Favières, Seine-et-Marne. In 1801 David commissioned Serangeli and other artists to illustrate Jean Racine's Mithridate, probably among the last work he received from David.

Serangeli exhibited at the Salon of the Louvre from the Salon of 1793 onward. He presented a Flight into Egypt in 1794, which was purchased by Gaudefroy and then sold to Vauthier. In 1795 he presented Roman Charity, considered by the critics to be inspired by Guido Reni. This work was highly praised for its skillful treatment of lighting. In 1796 he presented Orpheus pleading, now at the Museum of Music. This work confirmed his artistic status and began to arouse jealousy from other artists. He obtained his second official award at this time with his Death of Eurydice. He continued to exhibit at the Salon every year until the Salon of 1814, when he presented his most important work, Pirro after killing Priam takes Polixene to sacrifice at the tomb of Achilles.

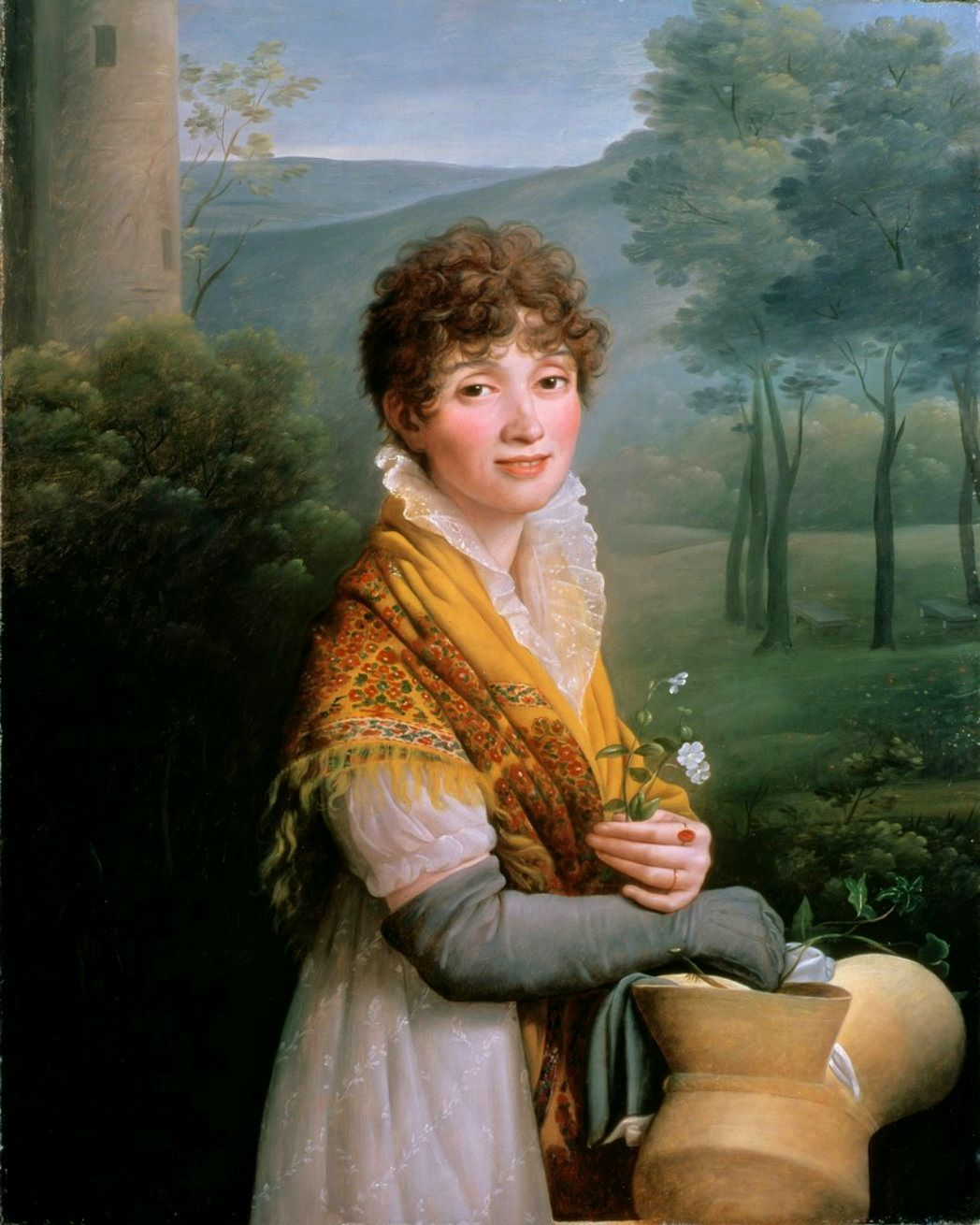
Portrait of a young Woman (1807–1810)

Serangeli became a leading portrait painter for the new ruling class of the empire. His 1899 portrait of Germaine Faipoult de Maisoncelle and her daughter Julie, the wife and daughter of Guillaume-Charles Faipoult de Maisoncelle, is an example of his work in this period. His Portrait of a young Woman, now in the Ashmolean Museum of the University of Oxford, probably dates from 1807-10. Although the subject is unknown, the fashionably and expensively dressed young woman was probably painted for her future or present husband. At least eight of Serangeli's private portraits were exhibited at the Salon. He also painted mythological and religious subjects.

Serangeli opened a studio in Paris in 1805, and taught some well-known students such as Claudio Linati, who was also a lithographer. His pupil Jean-Baptiste Vinchon won the second Prix de Rome for painting in 1813 and the first Prix de Rome in 1814. In 1807 Napoleon's Minister of Arts, Denon, commissioned Serangeli to paint events in the career of Napoleon, starting with Napoleon receiving the deputies of the army, which was exhibited in the Salon of 1808. The painting was used as the design for a tapestry. In 1808 he created Napoleon and Alexander I after the Peace of Tilsit, now at Versailles. The painting gives a somewhat romantic view of the historical event where the Treaties of Tilsit were signed, which was itself staged rather theatrically.

== Later years ==
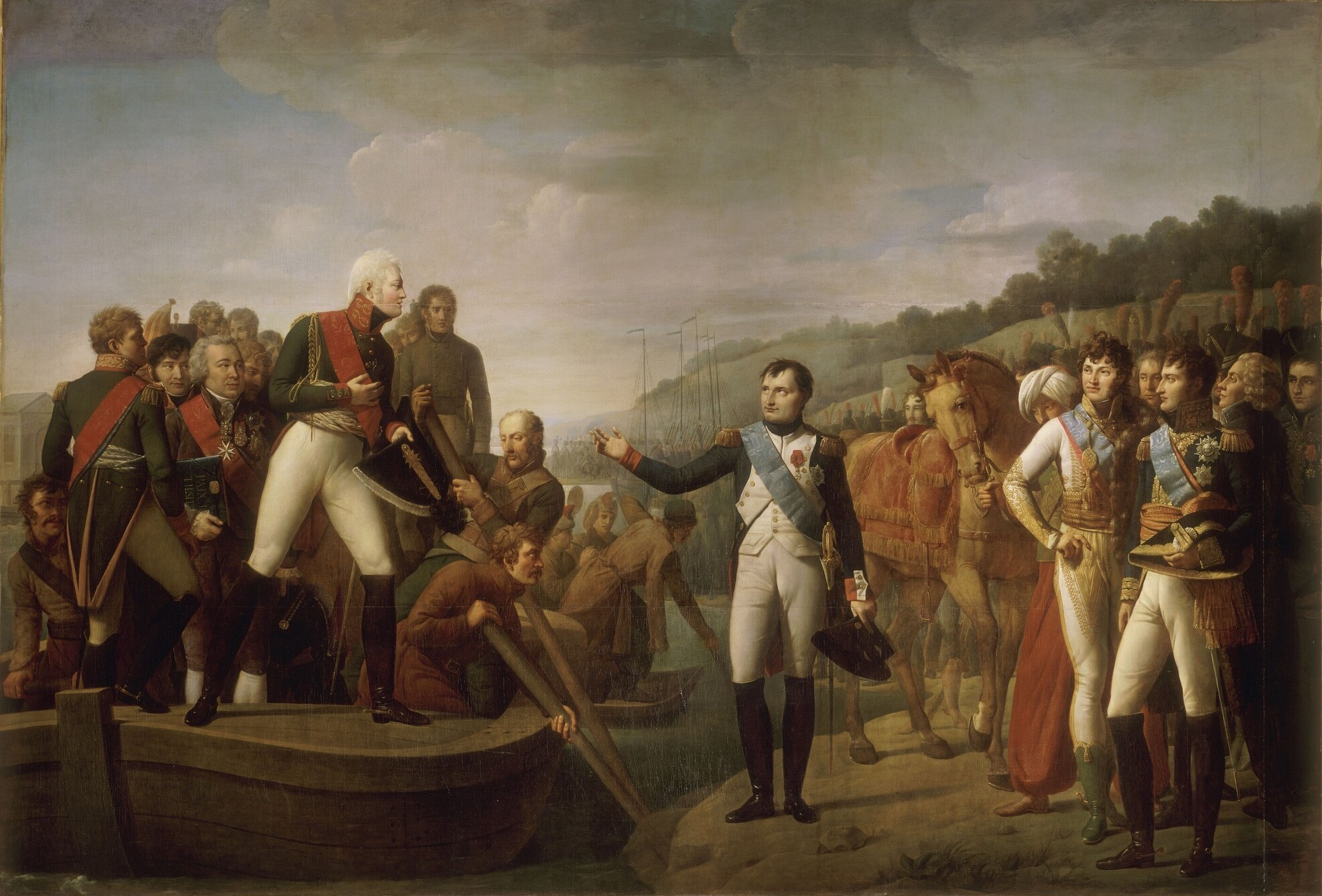
Farewell of Napoleon and Alexander after the Peace of Tilsit

In December 1817 Serengeli was named correspondant to the Académie des beaux-arts, and sent his thanks from Milan. After his return to Italy he made frescos from the legend of Cupid and Psyche to decorate the Villa Sommariva on Lake Como. He eventually settled in Milan, and became Professor to the Academy of Fine Arts of Milan. Gioacchino Giuseppe Serangeli died in Turin on 12 January 1852. Only a few dozen known works have survived. In France he is known for the part he played as an artist on the Empire. The mature works that he made after his return to Italy are valued by collectors there.

== Surviving works ==
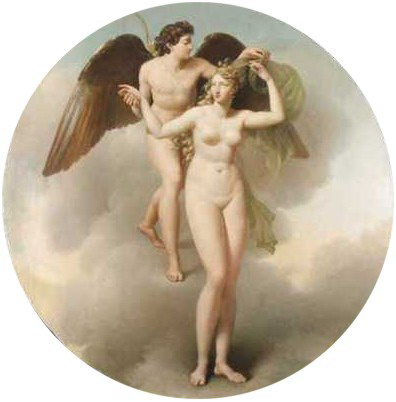
Venus and Cupid (ca. 1830)

Paintings by Serangeli are held at Versailles, Chambery, Milan and in private collections. These include:

- Napoléon reçoit au Louvre les députés de l'armée après son couronnement. 8 décembre 1804, Versailles; musée national du château et des Trianons, 1808;
- Adieux de Napoléon et d'Alexandre après la paix de Tilsitt. 9 juillet 1807, Versailles; musée national du château et des Trianons, 1810;
- La Charité romaine, Musée des beaux-arts de Chambéry, 1824;
- Orphée aux enfers,3,50 × 4,70 m, Paris, musée de la musique.
- Sophocle plaidant sa cause devant l'aréopage, 3,50 × 4,65 m Paris, musée de la musique.
- Silvio Pellico écrivant ses mémoires, musée des beaux-arts de Chambéry.
- Cupid and Psyche (230 cm diameter) in typical neoclassical setting with the two marble figures that fill the scene
- Portrait of the singer Giuditta Pasta, a great singer from Saronno, Lombardy, . The work is in the museum of La Scala in Milan, presumably made between 1820 and 1831
- Portrait of Princess Joséphine de Beauharnais in the Museum of the Palazzo Belgioioso
- Portrait of a young woman, Ashmolean Museum, University of Oxford
- Portrait of the young painter Auguste Vinchon 55,5 x 46 cm
- Portrait of the Artist 73 x 59 cm
- Portrait of a woman dressed in neo-classical habit
- Portrait of Germaine Faipoult de Maisoncelle and Her Daughter Julie Playing the Spinet, circa 1799, oil on canvas, 192.1 x 128 cm, Chrysler Museum of Art;
- Venus and Cupid with the Three Graces 100 x 75 cm
- Venus and Cupid sleeping 95 x 127 cm
