= Henri-Joseph de Forestier =

French painter

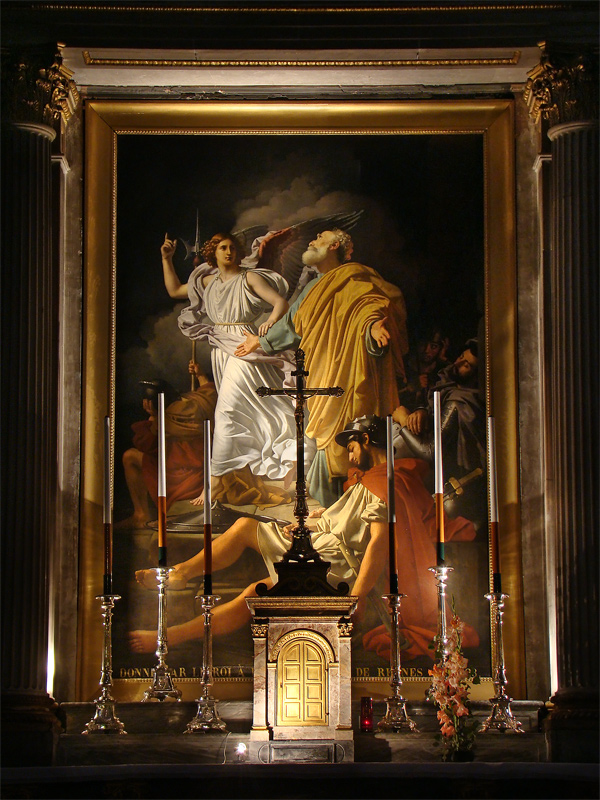
The Deliverance of Saint Peter, 1828, in the south arm of the transept of Rennes Cathedral

Henri-Joseph de Forestier (born in San Domingo in 1790) was a pupil of Vincent and David, and obtained in 1813 the first prize, which enabled him to go to Rome. There he became very favourably known through his paintings of Anacreon and Cupid. He died in 1872. Among his historical and genre paintings may be mentioned:

- Christ healing the Demoniac. 1817. (Louvre, Paris.)
- The Funeral of William the Conqueror.
