= Napoleon's Bivouac on the Battlefield of Wagram =

Painting by Adolphe Roehn

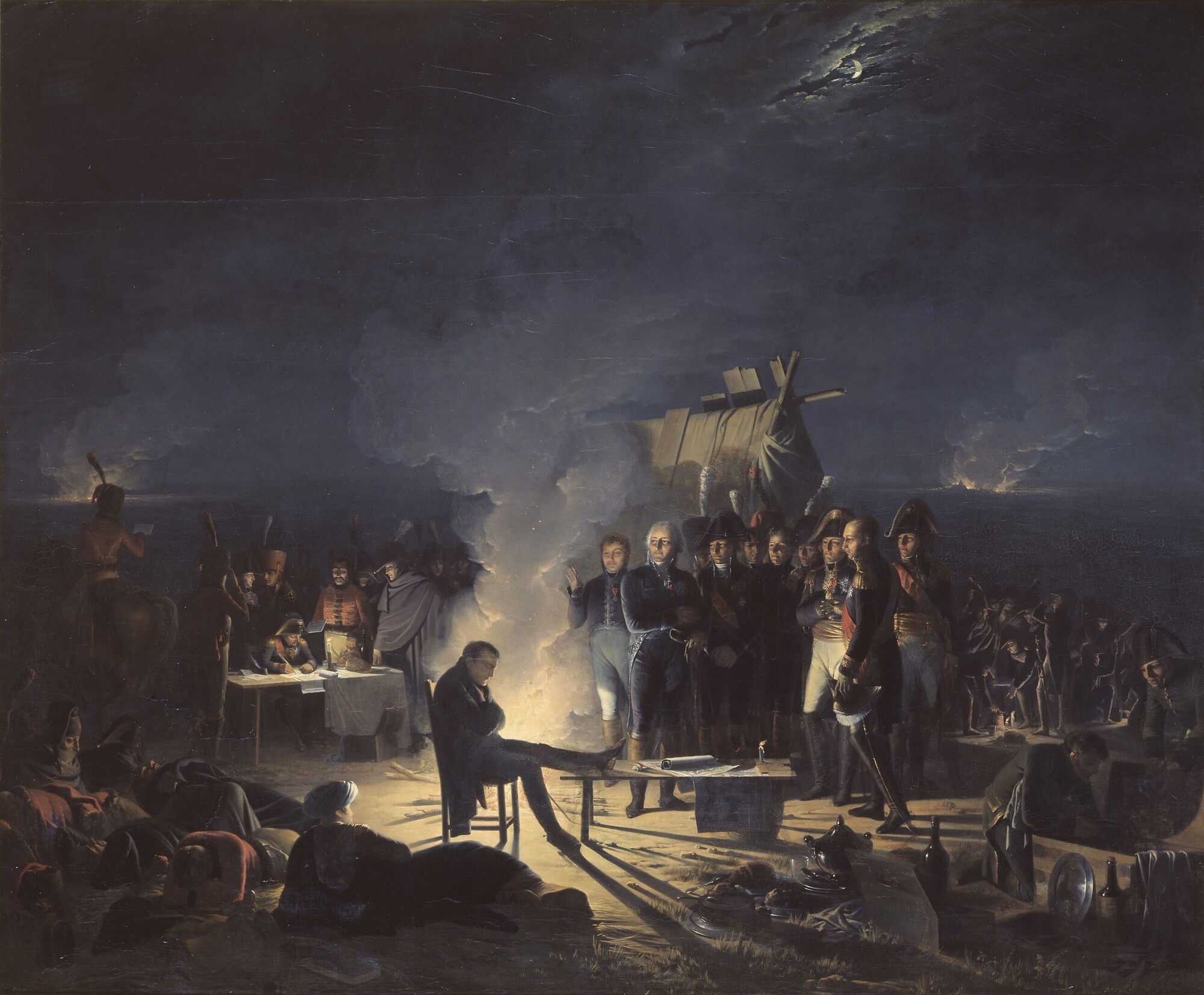
- Artist: Adolphe Roehn
- Year: 1810
- Type: Oil on canvas, history painting
- Dimensions: 182.5 cm × 222 cm (71.9 in × 87 in)
- Location: Palace of Versailles, Versailles

Napoleon's Bivouac on the Battlefield of Wagram (French: Bivouac de Napoléon Ier sur le champ de bataille de Wagram) is an 1810 history painting by the French artist Adolphe Roehn. It depicts a scene from the Battle of Wagram during the War of the Fifth Coalition, part of the Napoleonic Wars. The French Emperor Napoleon at his headquarters deep in thought. He is surrounded by his staff and military commanders during the night of the 5 July 1809. Heavy fighting had taken place that day. It would continue on the 6 July with the French winning a decisive victory leading Austria to rapidly make peace.

The work was commissioned by Napoleon. It was featured at the Salon of 1810, held at the Louvre in Paris. Today it is in the collection of the Musée de l'Histoire de France at the Palace of Versailles, having been transferred there in 1835.

== Bibliography ==
- Day-Hickman, Barbara Ann. Napoleonic Art: Nationalism and the Spirit of Rebellion in France (1815-1848). University of Delaware Press, 1999.
- Grigsby, Darcy Grimaldo. Extremities: Painting Empire in Post-revolutionary France. Yale University Press, 2002.
