= Adolphe Roehn =

French painter (1780–1867)

- Born: Adolphe Eugène Gabriel Roehn; March 5, 1780; Paris, France
- Died: October 19, 1867 (aged 87); Malakoff, France
- Known for: Painting, printmaking
- Children: Jean Alphonse Roehn

Adolphe Roehn (March 5, 1780 – October 19, 1867) was a French painter, draughtsman, and lithographer.

Roehn exhibited his work in the Paris Salon from Salon of 1799 to 1866, winning a second class medal at the Salon of 1819. Between 1802 and 1814, under the direction of Baron Vivant Denon, the director of the Louvre, he created a series of drawings illustrating Napoleon's campaigns in Italy. After the bloody Battle of Eylau in 1807, Vivant Denon held a propaganda contest requiring entrants depict a certain scene from the event. Roehn received a "gold medal of encouragement" (the winning entry was Napoléon on the Battlefield of Eylau by Antoine-Jean Gros).

Like his son, Jean Alphonse Roehn, he taught drawing at the Louis-Legrand School.

== Gallery ==
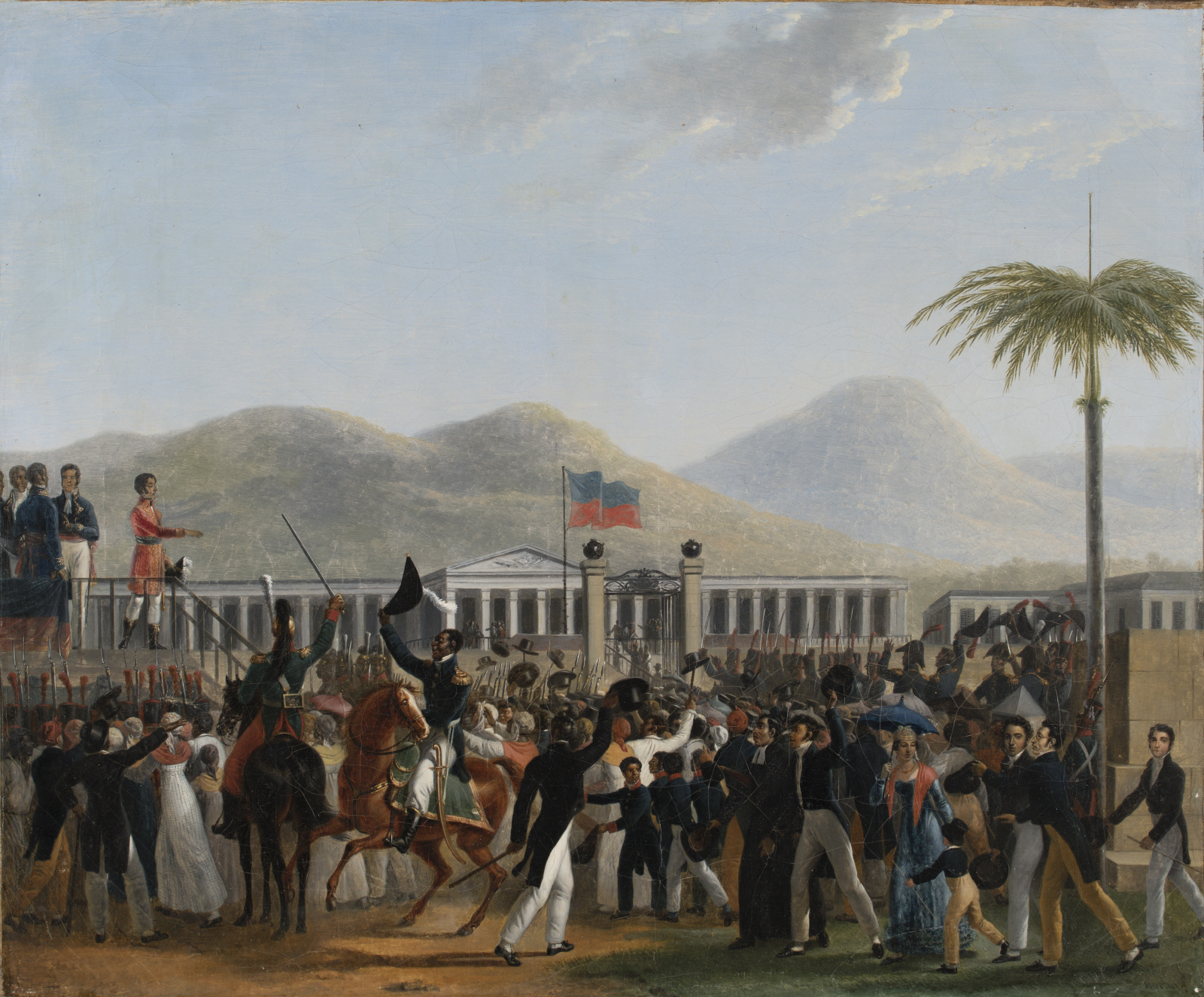
The Swearing in of President Boyer at the Palace of Haiti, ca. 1818, Clark Art Institute, Williamstown

Country Fair

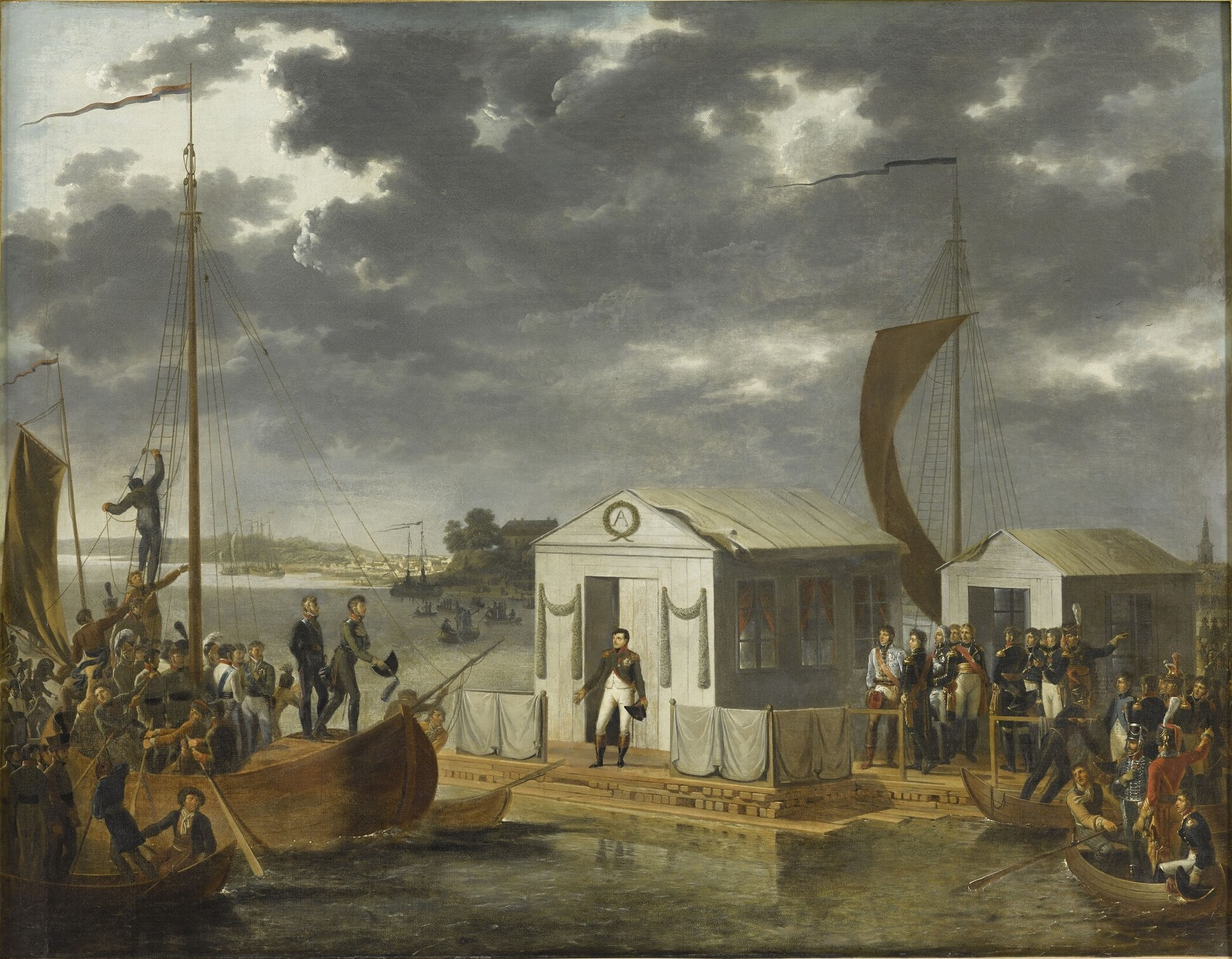
The Meeting of Napoleon I and Tsar Alexander I at Tilsit, 1808

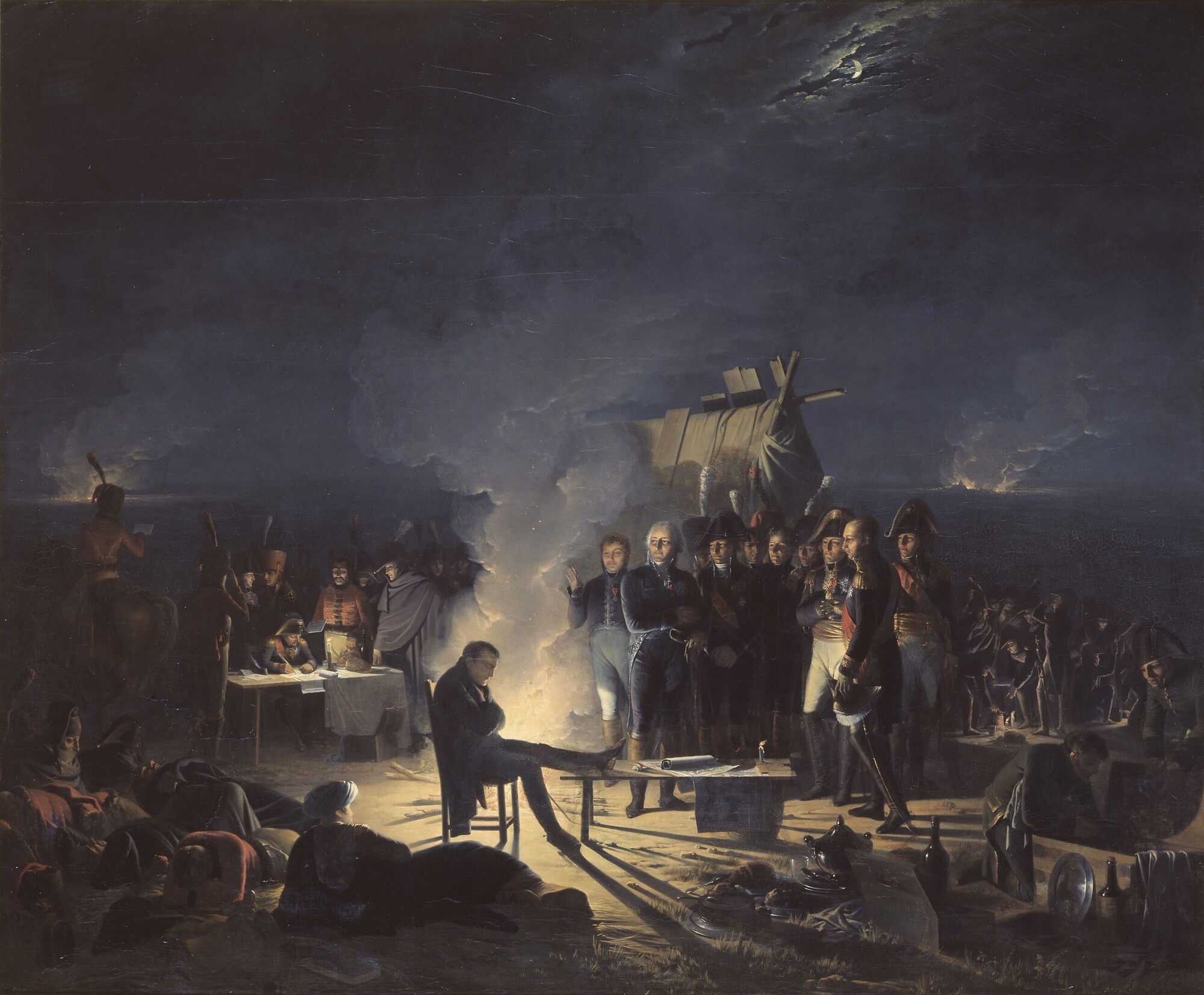
Napoleon's Bivouac on the Battlefield of Wagram, 1810
