= German exonyms =

Below is a list of German language exonyms for formerly German places and other places in non-German-speaking areas of the world. Archaic names are in italics.

== Algeria ==
Algeria Algerien
English name	German name	Endonym		Notes
English name	German name	Name	Language	Notes
Algiers	Algier	Al-Jazā'ir	Arabic	

== Belarus ==
Belarus Weißrussland
English name	German name	Endonym		Notes
English name	German name	Name	Language	Notes
Grodno	Garten	Hrodna	Belarusian	Archaic

== Belgium ==
- List of German exonyms for places in Belgium

Belgium Belgien
English name	German name	Endonym		Notes
English name	German name	Name	Language	Notes
Antwerp	Antorff	Antwerpen	Dutch	Archaic
Bruges	Brügge	Brugge	Dutch	
Brussels	Brüssel	Brussel	Dutch	
Brussels	Brüssel	Bruxelles	French	
Leuven	Löwen	Leuven	Dutch	
Liège	Lüttich	Lidje	Walloon	
Liège	Lüttich	Liège	French	
Ostend	Ostende	Oostende	Dutch	

== China ==
China
English name	German name	Endonym		Notes
English name	German name	Name	Language	Notes
Beijing	Peking	Beijing	Mandarin	
Guangzhou	Kanton	Guangzhou	Mandarin	
Jiaozhou	Kiautschou	Jiaozhou	Mandarin	
Nanjing	Nanking	Nanjing	Mandarin	
Qingdao	Tsingtau	Qingdao	Mandarin	

== Croatia ==
- List of German exonyms for places in Croatia

== Cyprus ==
Cyprus Zypern
English name	German name	Endonym		Notes
English name	German name	Name	Language	Notes
Nicosia	Nikosia	Lefkosía (Λευκωσία)	Greek	
Nicosia	Nikosia	Lefkoşa	Turkish	

== Czech Republic ==
- See List of German names for places in the Czech Republic

== Denmark ==
- List of German exonyms for places in Denmark

Denmark Dänemark
English name	German name	Endonym		Notes
English name	German name	Name	Language	Notes
Copenhagen	Kopenhagen	København	Danish	

== Djibouti ==
Djibouti Dschibuti
English name	German name	Endonym		Notes
English name	German name	Name	Language	Notes
Djibouti	Dschibuti	Ville de Djibouti	French	

== Egypt ==
Egypt Ägypten
English name	German name	Endonym		Notes
English name	German name	Name	Language	Notes
Cairo	Kairo	al-Qāhirah	Arabic	

== Estonia ==
- List of German exonyms for places in Estonia

== Faroe Islands ==
Faroe Islands Färöer Inseln
English name	German name	Endonym		Notes
English name	German name	Name	Language	Notes
Akraberg	Äckerkliff	Akraberg	Faroese	
Gásadalur	Gänsetal	Gásadalur	Faroese	
Hoyvík	Heubucht	Hoyvík	Faroese	
Haldórsvík	Halldórsbucht	Haldórsvík	Faroese	
Kirkjubøur	Kirchdorf	Kirkjubøur	Faroese	
Miðvágur	Mittelbucht	Miðvágur	Faroese	
Syðradalur	Südtal	Syðradalur	Faroese	
Tórshavn	Thorshaven	Tórshavn	Faroese	
Vestmanna	Westmännerhafen	Vestmanna	Faroese	

== France ==
- List of German exonyms for places in France

France Frankreich
English name	German name	Endonym		Notes
English name	German name	Name	Language	Notes
Colmar	Kolmar	Colmar	French	
Dunkirk	Dünkirchen	Dunkerque	French	
Mulhouse	Mülhausen	Mulhouse	French	
Nice	Nizza	Nice	French	
Strasbourg	Straßburg	Strasbourg	French	
Limoges	Lünheim	Limoges	French	

== Georgia ==
Georgia Georgien
English name	German name	Endonym		Notes
English name	German name	Name	Language	Notes
Tbilisi	Tiflis	Tbilisi	Georgian	

== Greece ==
Greece Griechenland
English name	German name	Endonym		Notes
English name	German name	Name	Language	Notes
Athens	Athen	Athína	Greek	
Corfu	Korfu	Kérkyra	Greek	
Corinth	Korinth	Kórinthos	Greek	
Piraeus	Piräus	Piraiás	Greek	
Thebes	Theben	Thiva	Greek	
Crete	Kreta	Kríti	Greek	
Rhodes	Rhodos	Ródos	Greek	

== Hungary ==
- List of German exonyms for places in Hungary

== India ==
India Indien
English name	German name	Endonym		Notes
English name	German name	Name	Language	Notes
Kolkata	Kalkutta	Kolkata	Bengali	

== Israel ==
Israel
English name	German name	Endonym		Notes
English name	German name	Name	Language	Notes
Acre	Akkon, Akko	Ako	Hebrew	
Alonei Abba	Waldheim	Aloney Abba	Hebrew	Archaic
Ashkelon	Ascalon	Ashkelon	Hebrew	
Bnei Atarot	Wilhelma	Bney Atarot	Hebrew	Archaic
Daburiyya	Tabor	Daburiyya	Hebrew	
Kafr Kanna	Kana	Kafr Kanna	Hebrew	
Kfar Tavor	Kfar Tabor	Kfar Tavor	Hebrew	
Lod	Lydda	Lod	Hebrew	
Netzer Sereni	Bir Salem	Netzer Sereni	Hebrew	Used for times before 1948
Sea of Galilee	See Genezareth	Yamat HaKineret	Hebrew	
Sharona	Sarona	Sharona	Hebrew	Used for times before 1948

== Italy ==
Italy
English name	German name	Endonym		Notes
English name	German name	Name	Language	Notes
Agrigento	Agrigent	Agrigento	Italian	
Brescia	Brixen	Brescia	Italian	Archaic: Wälsch-Brixen
Florence	Florenz	Firenze	Italian	
Genoa	Genua	Genova	Italian	
Gorizia	Görz	Gorizia	Italian	
Milan	Mailand	Milano	Italian	
Naples	Neapel	Napoli	Italian	
Rome	Rom	Roma	Italian	
Syracuse	Syrakus	Siracusa	Italian	
Taranto	Tarent	Taranto	Italian	
Trento	Trient	Trento	Italian	
Trieste	Triest	Trieste	Italian	
Venice	Venedig	Venezia	Italian	
Verona	Wälsch-Bern	Verona	Italian	Archaic

== Japan ==
Japan
English name	German name	Endonym		Notes
English name	German name	Name	Language	Notes
Tokyo	Tokio	Toukyou	Japanese	

== Latvia ==
- List of German exonyms for places in Latvia

== Lebanon ==
Lebanon Libanon
English name	German name	Endonym		Notes
English name	German name	Name	Language	Notes
Tripoli	Tripoli(s)	Ṭarabulus	Arabic	
Tyre	Tyrus	Ṣūr	Arabic	

== Libya ==
Libya Libyen
English name	German name	Endonym		Notes
English name	German name	Name	Language	Notes
Tripoli	Tripolis	Ṭarabulus	Arabic	

== Lithuania ==
Lithuania Litauen
English name	German name	Endonym		Notes
English name	German name	Name	Language	Notes
Alytus	Alitten	Alytus	Lithuanian	
Kretinga	Crottingen	Kretinga	Lithuanian	
Gargždai	Garsden	Gargždai	Lithuanian	
Kaunas	Kauen	Kaunas	Lithuanian	
Klaipėda	Memel	Klaipėda	Lithuanian	
Nida	Nidden	Nida	Lithuanian	
Pagėgiai	Pogegen	Pagėgiai	Lithuanian	
Palanga	Polangen	Palanga	Lithuanian	
Panevėžys	Ponewiesch	Panevėžys	Lithuanian	
Rusnė	Ruß	Rusnė	Lithuanian	
Saugos	Saugen	Saugos	Lithuanian	
Šiauliai	Schaulen	Šiauliai	Lithuanian	
Šilutė	Heydekrug	Šilutė	Lithuanian	
Tauragė	Tauroggen	Tauragė	Lithuanian	
Ukmergė	Wilkomir	Ukmergė	Lithuanian	
Vilkyčiai	Wilkieten	Vilkyčiai	Lithuanian	
Vilnius	Wilna	Vilnius	Lithuanian	

== Luxembourg ==
Note that this list only includes towns whose German name is significantly different from the official (mainly French) form. Towns that differ with predictable spelling/ ending changes shown below are not included.

- ae, c, é, oe, ou, u, v → ä, k, e, ö, u, ü, w
- -ange, -haff → -ingen, -hof

Luxembourg Luxemburg
English name	German name	Endonym		Notes
English name	German name	Name	Language	Notes
Bellain	Besslingen	Bellain		
Bavigne	Böwen	Bavigne		
Beaufort	Befort	Beaufort		
Belair	Neumerl	Belair		
Belvaux	Beles	Belvaux		
Berlé	Berl	Berlé		
Bicherhaff	Bicherhof	Bicherhaff		
Bigonville	Bondorf	Bigonville		
Blaschette	Blanscht	Blaschette		
Boevange	Bögen	Boevange		
Boevange-sur-Attert	Bögen an der Attert	Boevange-sur-Attert		
Bollendorf-Pont	Bollendorferbrück	Bollendorf-Pont		
Born-Moulin	Bornmühlen	Born-Moulin		
Boulaide	Basuchleiden	Boulaide		
Bourscheid-Moulin	Burscheidermühle	Bourscheid-Moulin		
Brouch	Bruch	Brouch		
Burschtermillen	Burschtermühlen	Burschtermillen		
Carelshaff	Karlshoff	Carelshaff		
Cessange	Zessingen	Cessange		
Charage	Kerschen	Charage		
Clemency	Küntzig	Clemency		
Clervaux	Clerf	Clervaux		
Colbette	Kolbet	Colbette		
Cruchten	Krüchten	Cruchten		
Dabourg-Pont	Dasburgerbrück	Dabourg-Pont		
Doncols	Donkholz	Doncols		
Eschette	Brescht	Eschette		
Fensterdall	Fenstertal	Fensterdall		
Folschette	Fulscht	Folschette		
Fréiresmillen	Freiersmühlen	Fréiresmillen		
Groëstaen	Grünstein	Groëstaen		
Hachiville	Helzingen	Hachiville		
Hamiville	Heinsch	Hamiville		
Hongerhaff	Hungerhoff	Hongerhaff		
Kappellebour	Kappellenbur	Kappellebour		
Klenge Bourghaff	Kleiner Burghof	Klenge Bourghaff		
Koenerhaff	Könnerhaff	Koenerhaff		
Koeschettte	Köscht	Koeschettte		
Kreiz	Kreuz	Kreiz		
Lamadelaine	Rollingen	Lamadelaine		
Larochette	Fels	Larochette		
Meysembourg	Meisemburg	Meysembourg		
Michelbouch	Michelbuch	Michelbouch		
Michelsbierg	Michelsberg	Michelsbierg		
Mierschgronn	Mierschgrund	Mierschgronn		
Mondercange	Monnerich	Mondercange		
Mondorf-les-Bains	Bad Mondorf	Mondorf-les-Bains		
Moulin de Bigonville	Bondorfermühle	Moulin de Bigonville		
Moutfort	Mutfurt	Moutfort		
Neihaisgen	Neuhäuschen	Neihaisgen		
Perlé	Perl	Perlé		
Petit-Nobressart	Klein Elcherodt	Petit-Nobressart		
Pontpierre	Steinbrücken	Pontpierre		Both names mean "stone bridge"
Quarte-Vents	Vierwinden	Quarte-Vents		Both names mean "four winds"
Roodt-lès-Ell	Rodt bei Ell	Roodt-lès-Ell		
Roodt-sur-Eisch	Rodt an der Eisch	Roodt-sur-Eisch		
Roodt-sur-Syre	Rodt an der Syre	Roodt-sur-Syre		
Roudenhaff	Rodenhof	Roudenhaff		
Sanem	Sassenheim	Sanem		
Septfontaines	Simmern	Septfontaines		
Soleuvre	Zolver	Soleuvre		
Sonlez	Soller	Sonlez		
Surré	Syr	Surré		
Tarchamps	Ischpelt	Tarchamps		
Troine	Trotten	Troine		
Troisvierges	Ulflingen	Troisvierges		
Wallendorf-Pont	Wallendorferbrück	Wallendorf-Pont		
Wincrange	Wintger	Wincrange		

== Moldova ==
Moldova Moldawien
Moldovan place	German name	Endonym		Notes
Moldovan place	German name	Name	Language	Notes
Chișinău	Kischenau, Kischinau, Kischinew	Chișinău	Romanian	
Cioburciu (Transnistria)	Hirtenheim	Cioburciu	Romanian	
Rîșcani	Ryschkanowka	Rîșcani	Romanian	
Soltoaia	Scholtoi	Soltoaia	Romanian	
Valea Norocului	Glückstal	Valea Norocului	Romanian	

== Morocco ==
Morocco Marokko
English name	German name	Endonym		Notes
English name	German name	Name	Language	Notes
Essaouira	Mogador	aṣ-Ṣawīra	Arabic	outdated

== Myanmar ==
Myanmar
English name	German name	Endonym		Notes
English name	German name	Name	Language	Notes
Yangon	Rangun	Yangon	Burmese	Compare dated English Rangoon

== Namibia ==
Namibia
English name	German name	Endonym		Notes
English name	German name	Name	Language	Notes
Walvis Bay	Walfischbucht, Walfischbai	Walvis Bay	Afrikaans	
Windhoek	Windhuk	Windhoek	Afrikaans	

== Netherlands ==
Netherlands Die Niederlande
English name	German name	Endonym		Notes
English name	German name	Name	Language	Notes
Arnhem	Arnheim	Arnhem	Dutch	
Boskoop	Boskop	Boskoop	Dutch	
Kerkrade	Kirchrath	Kerkrade	Dutch	
Nieuweschans	Neuschanz	Nieuweschans	Dutch	
Nijmegen	Nimwegen	Nijmegen	Dutch	
Roermond	Rurmund	Roermond	Dutch	
's-Hertogenbosch	Herzogenbusch	's-Hertogenbosch	Dutch	
Swalmen	Schwalmen	Swalmen	Dutch	
The Hague	Den Haag	Den Haag	Dutch	No definite article
Ubach over Worms	Waubach	Ubach over Worms	Dutch	
Wahlwiller	Wahlweiler	Wahlwiller	Dutch	

== North Korea ==
North Korea Nordkorea
English name	German name	Endonym		Notes
English name	German name	Name	Language	Notes
Pyongyang	Pjöngjang	P'yŏngyang	Korean	

== Norway ==
Norway Norwegen
English name	German name	Endonym		Notes
English name	German name	Name	Language	Notes
Trondheim	Drontheim	Trondheim	Norwegian	Obsolete; briefly used during World War II

== Papua New Guinea ==
Papua New Guinea Papua Neuguinea
English name	German name	Endonym		Notes
English name	German name	Name	Language	Notes
Kokopo	Herbertshöhe	Kokopo		

== Poland ==
- List of German exonyms for places in Poland

Poland Polen
English name	German name	Endonym		Inhabitant and surname
English name	German name	Name	Language	Inhabitant and surname
Bydgoszcz	Bromberg	Bydgoszcz	Polish	Bromberger
Gdańsk	Danzig	Gdańsk	Polish	Danziger
Katowice	Kattowitz	Katowice	Polish	Kattowitzer
Kraków	Krakau	Kraków	Polish	Krakauer
Poznań	Posen	Poznań	Polish	Posener
Szczecin	Stettin	Szczecin	Polish	Stettiner
Warsaw	Warschau	Warszawa	Polish	Warschauer
Wrocław	Breslau	Wrocław	Polish	Breslauer

== Portugal ==
Portugal
English name	German name	Endonym		Notes
English name	German name	Name	Language	Notes
Lisbon	Lissabon	Lisboa	Portuguese	

== Romania ==
- For German exonyms of Romania in Transylvania, see: German exonyms (Transylvania)

Romania Rumänien
English name	German name	Endonym		Notes
English name	German name	Name	Language	Notes
Bacău	Bakau	Bacău	Romanian	Archaic
Baia Mare	Frauenbach	Baia Mare	Romanian	Archaic
Botoșan	Botoschan	Botoșan	Romanian	Archaic
Brașov	Kronstadt	Brașov	Romanian	Archaic
Bucharest	Bukarest	București	Romanian	
Buzău	Busäu	Buzău	Romanian	Archaic
Câmpulung	Langena	Câmpulung	Romanian	Archaic
Cluj-Napoca	Klausenburg	Cluj-Napoca	Romanian	Archaic
Constanța	Konstanz(a)	Constanța	Romanian	Archaic
Craiova	Kragau, Krajowa	Craiova	Romanian	Archaic
Curtea de Argeș	Argisch	Curtea de Argeș	Romanian	Archaic
Focșani	Fokschan	Focșani	Romanian	Archaic
Galați	Galatz	Galați	Romanian	Archaic
Giurgiu	Sankt Georg, Zurz	Giurgiu	Romanian	Archaic
Hunedoara	Eisenmarkt	Hunedoara	Romanian	Archaic
Iași	Jassy	Iași	Romanian	Archaic
Oradea	Großwardein	Oradea	Romanian	Archaic
Piatra Neamț	Kreuzburg an der Bistritz	Piatra Neamț	Romanian	Archaic
Pitești	Pitesk	Pitești	Romanian	Archaic
Râmnicu Sărat	Rebnick, Rümnick	Râmnicu Sărat	Romanian	Archaic
Râmnicu Vâlcea	Königsberg, Wultsch	Râmnicu Vâlcea	Romanian	Archaic
Reșița	Reschitz(a)	Reșița	Romanian	Archaic
Roman	Romesmark	Roman	Romanian	Archaic
Satu Mare	Sathmar	Satu Mare	Romanian	Archaic
Sibiu	Hermannstadt	Sibiu	Romanian	Archaic
Sighișoara	Schäßburg	Sighișoara	Romanian	Archaic
Slatina	Zelatna	Slatina	Romanian	Archaic
Slobozia	Freisdtadt	Slobozia	Romanian	Archaic
Suceava	Suczawa	Suceava	Romanian	Archaic
Târgoviște	Tergowisch	Târgoviște	Romanian	Archaic
Târgu Jiu	Tergoschwyl	Târgu Jiu	Romanian	Archaic
Târgu Mureș	Neumarkt	Târgu Mureș	Romanian	Archaic
Timișoara	Temeschburg, Temeswar	Timișoara	Romanian	Archaic
Tulcea	Tultscha, Tultschs	Tulcea	Romanian	Archaic
Turnu Măgurele	Großnikopel	Turnu Măgurele	Romanian	Archaic

== Russia ==
- For German names of towns in Kaliningrad Oblast, see : German exonyms (Kaliningrad Oblast) and List of cities and towns in East Prussia

Russia Russland
English name	German name	Endonym		Notes
English name	German name	Name	Language	Notes
Gatchina	Lindemannstadt	Gatchina	Russian	Renamed during WWII in honor of Georg Lindemann
Kaliningrad	Königsberg	Kaliningrad	Russian	Archaic, founded with German name
Lomonosov	Oranienbaum	Lomonosov	Russian	Archaic, founded with German name
Moscow	Moskau	Moskva	Russian	
Saint Petersburg	Sankt Petersburg	Sankt Peterburg	Russian	Founded with German name in honor of St. Peter
Shlisselburg	Schlüsselburg	Shlisselburg	Russian	Archaic, founded with German name
Yekaterinburg	Katharinenburg	Yekaterinburg	Russian	Archaic, founded with German name

== Serbia ==
- List of German exonyms for places in Serbia

Serbia Serbien
English name	German name	Endonym		Notes
English name	German name	Name	Language	Notes
Belgrade	Belgrad	Beograd	Serbian	

== Slovakia ==
- List of German exonyms for places in Slovakia

== Slovenia ==
- List of German exonyms for places in Slovenia

== South Africa ==
South Africa Südafrika
English name	German name	Endonym		Notes
English name	German name	Name	Language	Notes
Cape Town	Kapstadt	Kaapstad	Afrikaans	
Cape Town	Kapstadt	Cape Town	English	
Cape Town	Kapstadt	iKapa	Xhosa	

== Spain ==
Spain Spanien
English name	German name	Endonym		Notes
English name	German name	Name	Language	Notes
Aragón	Aragonien	Aragón	Aragonese	
Balearic Islands	Balearen	Illes Balears	Catalan	
Canary Islands	Kanaren	Islas Canarias	Spanish	
Tenerife	Teneriffa	Tenerife	Spanish	
Zaragoza	Saragossa	Zaragoza	Spanish	

== Sweden ==
Sweden Schweden
English name	German name	Endonym		Notes
English name	German name	Name	Language	Notes
Gothenburg	Göteborg (Gotenburg)	Göteborg	Swedish	
Scania	Schonen	Skåne	Swedish	

== Switzerland ==
- List of German exonyms for places in Switzerland

Switzerland Schweiz
English name	German name	Endonym		Notes
English name	German name	Name	Language	Notes
Delémont	Delsberg	Delémont	French	
Geneva	Genf	Genève	French	
Neuchâtel	Neuenburg	Neuchâtel	French	
Sion	Sitten	Sion	French	

== Syria ==
Syria Syrien
English name	German name	Endonym		Notes
English name	German name	Name	Language	Notes
Damascus	Damaskus	Dimashq	Arabic	

== Taiwan ==
Taiwan
English name	German name	Endonym		Notes
English name	German name	Name	Language	Notes
Taipei	Taipeh	Taipei	Chinese (Wade-Giles romanization)	German name from Hokkien endonym

== Tanzania ==
All of the below names are now obsolete. They were formerly used when Tanzania was part of the colony of German East Africa.

Tanzania Tansania
English name	German name	Endonym		Notes
English name	German name	Name	Language	Notes
Galula	St. Moritz	Galula		
Igulwa	Mariahilf	Igulwa		
Ikombe	Alt-Langenburg	Ikombe		
Ilembule	Emmaberg	Ilembule		
Kasanga	Bismarckburg, Wißmannhafen	Kasanga		German names referred to two different cities
Kazimzumbwi	Kaiseraue	Kazimzumbwi		
Kirondatal	Kirondathal	Kirondatal		
Kizarawe	Hoffnungshöh	Kizarawe		
Leganga	Leudorf	Leganga		
Liuli	Sphinxhafen	Liuli		
Lumbira	Neu-Langenburg	Lumbira		
Lushoto	Wilhelmsdorf, Wilhelsmthal	Lushoto		
Manda	Weidhafen	Manda		
Mbulu	Neu-Trier	Mbulu		
Mibirizi	Bergfrieden	Mibirizi		
Mikese	Neu-Bonn	Mikese		
Mlalo	Hohenfriedberg	Mlalo		
Mnazi	Neu-Bethel	Mnazi		
Nansio	Peterswerft	Nansio		
Nyakanazi	Friedberg	Nyakanazi		
Rombo	Fischerstadt	Rombo		
Sekenke	Sachsenwald	Sekenke		
Shume	Neu-Hornow	Shume		
Tukuyu	Langenburg	Tukuyu		
Ushetu	Marienthal	Ushetu		
Uvinza	Gottorp	Uvinza		

== Turkey ==
Turkey Türkei
English name	German name	Endonym		Notes
English name	German name	Name	Language	Notes
Antakya	Antiochia	Antakya	Turkish	Archaic
Edirne	Adrianopel	Ediren	Turkish	Archaic
Ephesus	Ephesos	Efes	Turkish	
Gallipoli	Gallipoli	Gelibolu	Turkish	
Halicarnassus	Halikarnassos	Halikarnas	Turkish	
Istanbul	Byzanz	İstanbul	Turkish	Archaic
Istanbul	Konstantinopel	İstanbul	Turkish	Archaic
İzmir	Smyrna	İzmir	Turkish	Archaic
Trabzon	Trapezunt	Trabzon	Turkish	Archaic
Troy	Troja	Truva	Turkish	

== Ukraine ==
Ukraine
English name	German name	Endonym		Notes
English name	German name	Name	Language	Notes
Bazaryanka	Schulzheim	Bazaryanka		Founded with German name
Belenkoye	Schabolat	Belenkoye		Founded with German name
Berehove	Bergsaß, Lampertshaus	Berehove		
Bilhorod-Dnistrovsky	Akkerman	Akkerman		
Buschtyno	Buschtyn an der Theiß	Buschtyno		
Chernivtsi	Czernowitz/Tschernowitz	Chernivtsi		
Chernobyl	Tschernobyl	Chernobyl		
Dubove	Dombau, Dombo	Dubove		
Ivano-Frankivsk	Stanislau	Ivano-Frankivsk		
Georgievka	Mariental	Georgievka		Founded with German name
Glinnaya	Glückstal	Glinnaya		Founded with German name
Karmanova	Neudorf	Karmanova		Founded with German name
Khust	Hußt	Khust		
Kolosova	Bergdorf	Kolosova		Founded with German name
Komarivka	Kassel	Komarivka		Founded with German name
Korolevo	Königsfeld an der Theiß	Korolevo		
Lviv	Lemberg	Lviv		
Mukachevo	Munkatsch	Mukachevo		
Rakhiv	Rauhau	Rakhiv		
Rivne	Röwne	Rivne		
Sergeievko	Josefstal	Sergeievko		Founded with German name
Sevastopol	Sewastopol	Sevastopol		
Shabo	Schabo Kolonie	Shabo		Founded with German name
Solotvyno	Salzgruben	Solotvyno		
Svaliava	Schwal(l)bach	Svaliava		
Tiachiv	Großteutschenau	Tiachiv		
Uzhhorod	Ungarish Burg, Ungstadt, Ungwar	Uzhhorod		
Vinnytsia	Winniza	Vinnytsia		

== United Kingdom ==
United Kingdom Vereinigtes Königreich
English name	German name	Endonym		Notes
English name	German name	Name	Language	Notes
Birmingham	Bermingheim	Birmingham	English	Archaic
Canterbury	Kantelberg, Kanterberg	Canterbury	English	Archaic
Channel Islands	Kanalinseln, Normannische Inseln	Channel Islands	English	
Dover Strait	Straße von Calais	Dover Strait	English	
Edinburgh	Edinburg	Edinburgh	Scots	
Edinburgh	Edinburg	Dùn Èideann	Scottish Gaelic	
English Channel	Ärmelkanal	English Channel	English	
Orkney	Orkaden	Orkney	Scots	Archaic
Scalloway	Schaldewage	Scalloway	Scots	Archaic
Scotland	Schottland	Scotland	Scots	
Scotland	Schottland	Alba	Scottish Gaelic	
Thames	Themse	Thames	English	
White Cliffs of Dover	Kreidefelsen von Dover	White Cliffs of Dover	English	

== See also ==
- Endonym and exonym
- German names for Central European towns
- German placename etymology
- List of cities and towns in East Prussia
- List of English exonyms for German toponyms
- List of European exonyms
- List of settlements in Kaliningrad Oblast
- Names of Germany
