= Cross-border town naming =

Cross-border town naming occurs where towns or villages with the same or equivalent names are divided between two different countries. This does not necessarily imply that those towns or villages are located in geographic proximity or that they are located near a current border (divided cities). Reasons for this taking place may include the following:

- The town or village existed before the border or even before the modern concept of a border. The border was added later (sometimes by war), dividing a community.
- A community on one side of a border grows up to service the border and then takes the name of the adjacent community on the other side of the border.
- Communities grow up on both sides of the border to service the border, taking the name of the border crossing.

Most places are in Europe, but there are also some examples in Africa, Asia and the Americas. In Europe, until the first half of the 20th century and again since the Schengen Agreement in the late 20th century, such divisions could be mostly ignored by the inhabitants.

== Examples ==
Note that this list includes only places with similar names that are in some way connected (by history, geography or otherwise) across modern-day international borders. Towns that have the same name but bear no relationship to each other are also very common but not particularly notable.

=== Africa ===
Cross-border town	Countries
Moyale and Moyale	Ethiopia / Kenya
Mobaye and Mobayi-Mbongo	Central African Republic / Democratic Republic of the Congo
Cocobeach and Cogo	Gabon / Equatorial Guinea
Loukolela and Lukolela	Republic of the Congo / Democratic Republic of the Congo
Mulanje and Milange	Malawi / Mozambique
Chirundu and Chirundu	Zambia / Zimbabwe
Mukumbura and Mucumbara	Zimbabwe / Mozambique
Tin Zaouatine and Tinzaouaten	Algeria / Mali

=== Asia ===
Cross-border town	Countries
Astara and Astara	Azerbaijan / Iran
Julfa and Julfa	Azerbaijan / Iran
Biləsuvar and Bileh Savar	Azerbaijan / Iran
Luohu District and Lowu	China / Hong Kong SAR
Shatoujiao Subdistrict and Sha Tau Kok	China / Hong Kong SAR
Khorgas and Khorgas	China / Kazakhstan
Sarpi and Sarp	Georgia / Turkey
Padang Besar and Padang Besar	Malaysia / Thailand
Dibba /Al Buraimi-Al Ain	Oman / UAE
Al-Mazyunah and Shahan District	Oman / Yemen
Ishkoshim and Ishkashim	Tajikistan / Afghanistan
Sarahs and Sarakhs	Turkmenistan / Iran
Kara-Suu and Qorasuv	Uzbekistan / Kyrgyzstan

=== Europe ===
Cross-border town	Countries
Helsingør and Helsingborg	Denmark / Sweden
Rhederbrug, Rhederveld and Rhede	Netherlands / Germany
Barnflair (Ter Apel) and Barnfleer	Netherlands / Germany
Veenebrugge and Vennebrügge	Netherlands / Germany
Zwillbroek and Zwillbrock	Netherlands / Germany
Ubach over Worms and Übach-Palenberg	Netherlands / Germany
Spijk and Spyck	Netherlands / Germany
Baarle-Nassau and Baarle-Hertog	Netherlands / Belgium
Clinge and De Klinge	Netherlands / Belgium
Koewacht and Koewacht	Netherlands / Belgium
Putte and Putte	Netherlands / Belgium
Lichtenbusch and Aachen-Lichtenbusch	Belgium / Germany
Stubach and Stupbach	Belgium / Germany
Obereisenbach, Untereisenbach and Übereisenbach	Luxembourg / Germany
Wallendorf-Pont and Wallendorf	Luxembourg / Germany
Bollendorf-Pont and Bollendorf	Luxembourg / Germany
Echternach and Echternacherbrück	Luxembourg / Germany
Wasserbillig and Wasserbilligerbrück	Luxembourg / Germany
Comines-Warneton and Comines	Belgium / France
Wervik and Wervicq-Sud	Belgium / France
Quiévrain and Quiévrechain	Belgium / France
Gœgnies-Chaussée and Gognies-Chaussée	Belgium / France
Grand-Reng and Vieux-Reng	Belgium / France
Mondorf-les-Bains and Mondorff	Luxembourg / France
Leiding and Leidingen	France / Germany
Petite-Rosselle and Großrosseln	France / Germany
Grosbliederstroff and Kleinblittersdorf	France / Germany
Obergailbach and Niedergailbach	France / Germany
Scheibenhard and Scheibenhardt	France / Germany
Lauterbourg and Neulauterburg	France / Germany
Neuf-Brisach and Breisach	France / Germany
Kembs and Klein Kembs	France / Germany
Huningue and Kleinhüningen	France / Switzerland
Lucelle and Lucelle, Kleinlützel	France / Switzerland
Saint-Gingolph and Saint-Gingolph	France / Switzerland
Île des Faisans and Isla de los Faisanes (Konpantzia / Île de l'hôpital / Île de la Conférence)	France / Spain
Rheinfelden-Baden (Badisch-Rhyfälde) and Rheinfelden (Rhyfälde)	Germany / Switzerland
Laufenburg and Laufenburg	Germany / Switzerland
Reckingen (Küssaberg) / Rekingen	Germany / Switzerland
Vorderriß and Hinterriß	Germany / Austria
Bayerisch Gmain and Großgmain	Germany / Austria
Altwarp and Nowe Warpno	Germany / Poland
Rosow and Rosówek	Germany / Poland
Hohenwutzen and Osinów Dolny (Niederwutzen)	Germany / Poland
Zäckericker Loose and Siekierki (Zäckerick)	Germany / Poland
Güstebieser Loose and Gozdowice (Güstebiese)	Germany / Poland
Altrüdnitzer Ausbau and Stara Rudnica (Altrüdnitz)	Germany / Poland
Neulietzegöricke and Stare Łysogórki (Altlietzegöricke)	Germany / Poland
Zelliner Loose and Czelin (Zellin)	Germany / Poland
Küstrin-Kietz and Kostrzyn nad Odrą (Küstrin)	Germany / Poland
Lebus and Nowy Lubusz (Neulebus)	Germany / Poland
Kunitzer Loose / Kunice (Kunitz)	Germany / Poland
Aurith and Urad (Aurith)	Germany / Poland
Guben and Gubin	Germany / Poland
Zelz and Siedlec (Zelz)	Germany / Poland
Klein Priebus and Przewóz (Priebus)	Germany / Poland
Görlitz and Zgorzelec	Germany / Poland
Altlandsberg and Gorzów ((Neu))Landsberg)	Germany / Poland
Altentreptow and Trzebiatów (Treptow)	Germany / Poland
Seifhennersdorf and Horní Jindřichův (Oberhennersdorf)	Germany / Czech Republic
Zinnwald and Cínovec (Zinnwald)	Germany / Czech Republic
Deutschgeorgenthal and Český Jiřetín (Georgendorf)	Germany / Czech Republic
Deutscheinsiedel and Mníšek (Böhmisch Einsiedel)	Germany / Czech Republic
Deutschneudorf and Nová Ves v Horách (Gebirgsneudorf)	Germany / Czech Republic
Deutschkatharinenberg and Hora Svaté Kateřiny (Böhmisch Katherinenberg)	Germany / Czech Republic
Hammerunterwiesenthal and České Hamry (Böhmisch Hammer)	Germany / Czech Republic
Oberwiesenthal and Loučna (Böhmisch Wiesenthal)	Germany / Czech Republic
Neualbenreuth and Mýtina (Altalbenreuth)	Germany / Czech Republic
Bayerisch Eisenstein and Železná Ruda (Markt Eisenstein)	Germany / Czech Republic
Pelhřimovy and Pielgrzymów	Czech Republic / Poland
Opavice and Opawica	Czech Republic / Poland
Krásné Loučky / Krasne Pole	Czech Republic / Poland
Chomýž and Chomiąża	Czech Republic / Poland
Český Těšín (Czeski Cieszyn) / Cieszyn	Czech Republic / Poland
Horní Líštná and Leszna Górna	Czech Republic / Poland
Dziewięcierz and Devyatyr (Дев'ятир)	Poland / Ukraine
Uhrusk and Novouhruzke (Новоугрузьке)	Poland / Ukraine
Tokary and Tokary (Токари, Такары)	Poland / Belarus
Usnarz Górny and Usnar-Dolnyy (Уснар-Дольный)	Poland / Belarus
Minkowce and Minkovcy	Poland / Belarus
Nowodziel and Novodel	Poland / Belarus
Český Heršlák and Deutsch Hörschlag	Czech Republic / Austria
České Velenice and Gmünd	Czech Republic / Austria
Bad Radkersburg and Gornja Radgona	Austria / Slovenia
Deutschfeistritz and Slovenska Bistrica (Windischfeistritz)	Austria / Slovenia
Graz and Slovenj Gradec	Austria / Slovenia
Deutschlandsberg and Podčetrtek (Windischlandsberg)	Austria / Slovenia
Oberdrauburg and Dravograd (Unterdrauburg)	Austria / Slovenia
Unterloibl and Podljubelj (Unterloibl)	Austria / Slovenia
Moncenisio and Lanslebourg-Mont-Cenis	Italy / France
Briga Alta and La Brigue	Italy / France
Gorizia and Nova Gorica	Italy / Slovenia
Lavena Ponte Tresa and Ponte Tresa	Italy / Switzerland
Cremenaga and Ponte Cremenaga	Italy / Switzerland
Ponte Chiasso and Chiasso	Italy / Switzerland
Komárom and Komárno	Hungary / Slovakia
Sátoraljaújhely and Slovenské Nové Mesto	Hungary / Slovakia
Balassagyarmat and Slovenské Ďarmoty	Hungary / Slovakia
Esztergom and Štúrovo	Hungary / Slovakia
Nagylak and Nădlac	Hungary / Romania
Újszalonta and Salonta	Hungary / Romania
Kelebia and Kelebija	Hungary / Serbia
Rio de Onor and Rihonor de Castilla	Portugal / Spain
Karesuando and Kaaresuvanto	Sweden / Finland
Kuttainen and Kuttanen	Sweden / Finland
Katkesuando and Kätkäsuvanto	Sweden / Finland
Muonionalusta and Muonio	Sweden / Finland
Kihlangi and Kihlanki	Sweden / Finland
Pello and Pello	Sweden / Finland
Övertorneå and Ylitornio	Sweden / Finland
Karungi and Karunki	Sweden / Finland
Valga and Valka	Estonia / Latvia
Hrvatska Kostajnica and Kostajnica	Croatia / Bosnia and Herzegovina
Hrvatska Dubica and Kozarska Dubica	Croatia / Bosnia and Herzegovina
Stara Gradiška and Gradiška	Croatia / Bosnia and Herzegovina
Dolina and Donja Dolina, Gornja Dolina	Croatia / Bosnia and Herzegovina
Orubica and Orubica	Croatia / Bosnia and Herzegovina
Slavonski Kobaš and Kobaš	Croatia / Bosnia and Herzegovina
Dubočac and Bosanski Dubočac	Croatia / Bosnia and Herzegovina
Slavonski Brod and Brod	Croatia / Bosnia and Herzegovina
Svilaj and Donji Svilaj, Gornji Svilaj	Croatia / Bosnia and Herzegovina
Slavonski Šamac and Šamac	Croatia / Bosnia and Herzegovina
Bosanska Rača and Sremska Rača	Bosnia and Herzegovina / Serbia
Zvornik and Mali Zvornik	Bosnia and Herzegovina / Serbia
Metaljka and Metaljka	Bosnia and Herzegovina / Montenegro
Mali Žam and Jamu Mare	Serbia / Romania
Požeženo and Pojejena	Serbia / Romania
Veliki Gaj and Gaiu Mic	Serbia / Romania
Chilia Veche and Kiliya	Romania / Ukraine
Sculeni and Sculeni	Romania / Moldova
Ungheni and Ungheni	Romania / Moldova

=== North America ===
Towns and cities listed have names of a common origin across an international boundary; matching pairs across provincial or state boundaries (such as Kansas City or Lloydminster) are common but are not listed here.

Cross-border town	Countries
Beebe Plain, Quebec and Beebe Plain, Vermont	United States / Canada
Niagara Falls, Ontario and Niagara Falls, New York	United States / Canada
Sault Ste. Marie, Ontario and Sault Ste. Marie, Michigan	United States / Canada
North Portal, Saskatchewan and Portal, North Dakota	United States / Canada
Madawaska County, New Brunswick and Madawaska, Maine	United States / Canada
Calexico, California and Mexicali, Baja California	United States / Mexico
Tecate, California and Tecate, Baja California	United States / Mexico
Naco, Arizona and Naco, Sonora	United States / Mexico
Nogales, Arizona and Nogales, Sonora	United States / Mexico
San Luis, Arizona and San Luis Río Colorado, Sonora	United States / Mexico
El Paso, Texas and Ciudad Juárez, Chihuahua (formerly El Paso del Norte, 1852–1888)	United States / Mexico
Boquillas, Texas and Boquillas del Carmen, Coahuila	United States / Mexico
Laredo, Texas and Nuevo Laredo, Tamaulipas	United States / Mexico
Progreso, Texas and Nuevo Progreso, Tamaulipas	United States / Mexico

=== South America ===
Cross-border town	Countries
Antofagasta de la Sierra and Antofagasta	Argentina / Chile
Coquimbito and Coquimbo	Argentina / Chile
San Sebastián	Argentina / Chile
Foz do Iguaçu and Puerto Iguazú	Brazil / Argentina
Guajará-Mirim and Guayaramerín	Brazil / Bolivia
Oiapoque and Saint-Georges-de-l'Oyapock	Brazil / French Guiana
Chuí and Chuy	Uruguay / Brazil
Acegua and Aceguá	Uruguay / Brazil

== See also ==
- List of divided cities
- Transborder agglomeration
