= ISMI =

ISMI may refer to one of the following

- income support mortgage interest, social benefit in the UK to pay the mortgage interest
- Isotopic Solutions for Medicine and Industry Limited
- Institute for the Study of Modern Israel
- Institute for the Study of Man, Inc.
- International Sematech Manufacturing Initiative
- Ismi, a German exonym for a Hungarian place Izmény
