= Jean Majérus =

Luxembourgish cyclist

Personal information
- Born: 19 February 1891 Berlé, Luxembourg
- Died: 24 November 1961 (aged 70) Brussels, Belgium

Cycling career
- Sport: Cycling

Jean Majérus (19 February 1891 – 24 November 1961) was a Luxembourgish cyclist. He competed in two events at the 1920 Summer Olympics.
