= List of German exonyms for places in Estonia =

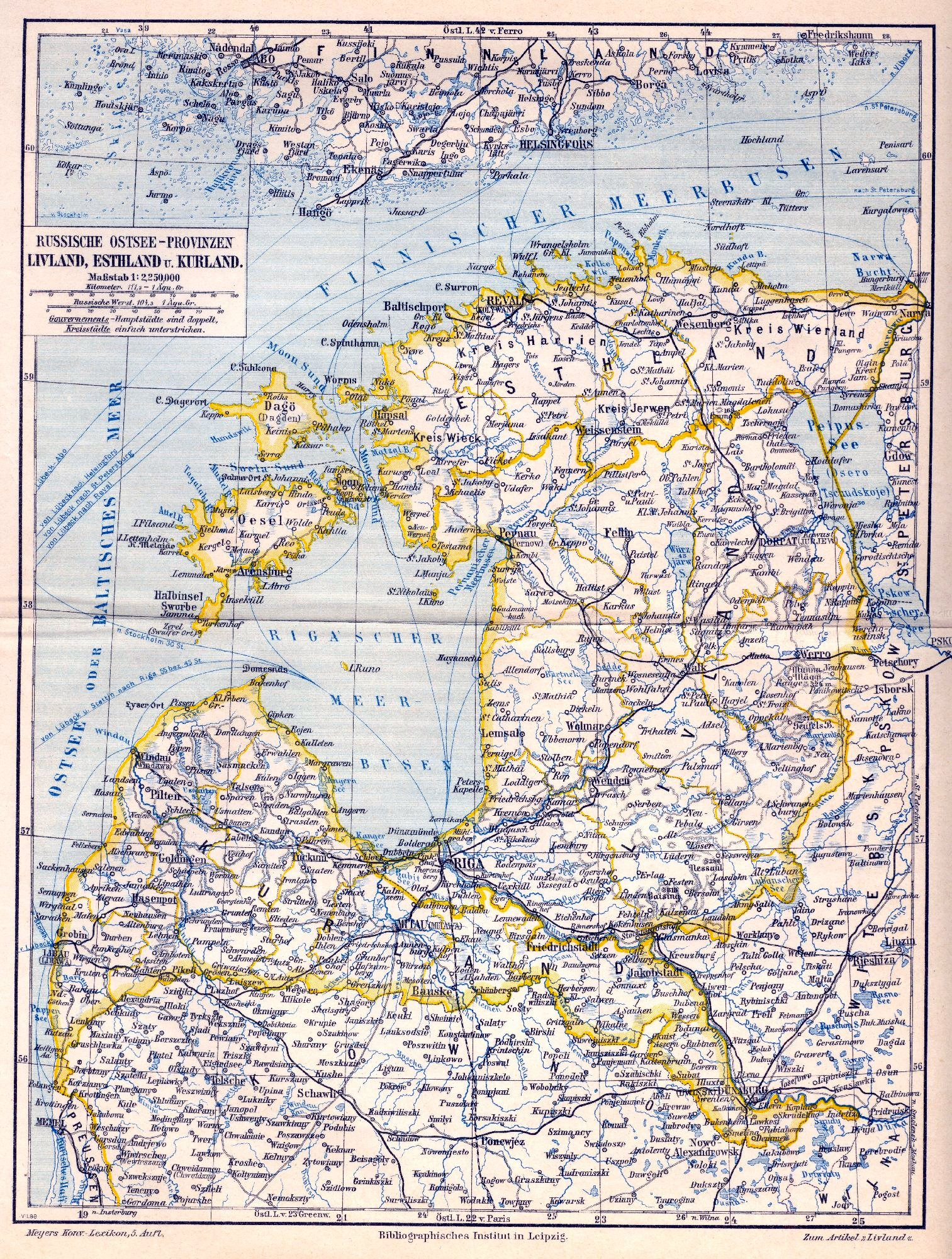
Map with German exonyms in Estonia and Latvia (Meyers Konversations-Lexikon, 1893-97)

Below is a list of German language exonyms for settlements and other places in Estonia.

== Complete list ==
Estonia Estland
Estonian place	German name	Notes
Ääsmäe	Essemägi	
Abja-Paluoja	Abbia	
Abruka	Abro	
Aegna	Wulf	
Aegviidu	Charlottenhof	
Ahja	Aga	
Ahja	Aja	
Äksi	Ecks	
Alatskivi	Allatzkivi	
Albu	Alp	
Alu	Alho	
Alu	Alitn	
Alu	Allo(ne)	
Alu	Al(l)un	
Alu	Al(u)wen	
Alu	Alven	
Alutaguse	Allentaken	
Ambla	Ampel	
Anna	St. Annen	
Annikvere	Annigfer	
Anseküla	Anseküll	
Antsla	Antzen	
Arbavere	Arbafer	
Ardu	Harde	
Arkna	Arknal	
Aruküla	Arroküll	
Arumetsa	Gutmansbach	
Arusaare	Arrosar	
Aruvalla	Arowall	
Aseri	Asserien	
Audru	Audern	
Avinurme	Awwinorm	
Elistvere	Ellistfer	
Emmaste	Emmast	
Erastvere	Errastfer	
Esku	Esko	
Haabersti	Habers	
Häädemeeste	Gudmannsbach	
Häädemeeste	Saraküll	
Haage	Haakhof	
Haapsalu	Hapsal	
Habaja	Habbat	
Hageri	Haggers	
Hagudi	Haggut	
Haimre	Heimar	
Haljala	Haljall	
Haljava	Hallinap	
Halista	Hallistg	
Hanila	Hannehl	
Hargla	Harjel	
Härjanurme	Herjanorm	
Harju-Jaani	St. Johannes	
Harjumaa	Harrien	
Harju-Madise	St. Matthias	
Harmi	Alt Harm	
Heimtali	Haimthal	
Helme	Helmet	
Hiiumaa	Dagö	
Hirmuste	Hirmus	
Hõbeda	Höbbet	
Holstre	Holstfershof	
Hõreda	Hödel	
Hummuli	Hommeln	
Huuksi	Hukas	
Ihasalu	Ihhasalu	
Ihaste	Igast	
Iisaku	Isaak	
Illuka	Illuck	
Illuste	Illust	
Ilmjärve	Ilmjerv	
Ilumäe	Illomägi	
Imavere	Immafer	
Imukvere	Immofer	
Inju	Innis	
Jaagupi	Jacobi	
Jägala	Jaggowal	
Jälgimäe	Jelgimaggi	
Jäneda	Jendel	
Järva-Jaani	St. Johannes	
Järvakandi	Jervakant	
Järvamaa	Jerven	
Järva-Madise	St. Matthaei	
Järve	Türpsal	
Jõelähtme	Jeglecht	
Jõgeva	Laisholm	
Jõhvi	Jewe	
Jõõpre	Jäpern	
Jööri	Jöhr	
Jüri	Jürgens	
Juuru	Jörden	
Kaagvere	Kavershof	
Kaarepere	Kersel	
Kaarma	Karmel	
Kabala	Cabbal	
Kabala	Kappel	
Kadrina	Katharinen	
Kadriorg	Cathriindal	
Kadriorg	Kat(h)arinenthal	
Käina	Keinis	
Kambja	Kambi	
Kalamaja	Die Fischermay	
Kalamaja	Suddenpe	
Kalamaja	Vischermaye	
Kärevere	Kerrafer	
Karja	Karris	
Karksi	Karkus	
Kärstna	Kerstenhof	
Käru	Kerro	
Karuse	Karusen	
Käsmu	Kaspervik	
Kassari	Kassar	
Kastre	Caster	
Kauksi	Kaucks	
Kaunissaare	Kaunissaar	
Kavastu	Kaaps	
Kavastu	Kappes	
Kavastu	Kawast	
Kavastu	Unnas	
Kavastu	Kawast	
Kavastu	Saleskyhof	
Keeri	Kehrimois	
Kehri	Kedder	
Kehtna	Kechtel	
Keila	Kegel	
Keila-Joa	Fall	
Kesselaid	Schildau	
Kihelkonna	Kielkond	
Kihnu	Kühno	
Kiidjärve	Kidjärv	
Kiisa	Kisa	
Kiiu	Kida	
Kiltsi	Ass	
Kirbla	Kirbel	
Kiviõli	Neu-Isenhof	
Klooga	Lodensee	
Kodasoo	Kotzum	
Kodavere	Kodafer	
Koeru	Sankt Marien-Magdalenen	
Kohila	Koil	
Kohtla-Järve	Kochtel-Türpsal	
Koigi	Koik	
Kõiguste	Koigust	
Kõinastu	Keinast	
Kolga	Kolk	
Kolga-Jaani	Klein Sankt Johannis	
Kõljala	Kölljall	
Kolu	Kollo	
Kopli	Teghelcoppel	
Kopli	Ziegelskoppel	
Kõpu	Köppo	
Kõrgessaare	Hohenholm	
Kose	Kosch	
Kostivere	Kostifer	
Kristiine	Christinthäler	
Kuigatsu	Kuikatz	
Kuigatsu	Löwenhof	
Kuivastu	Kuiwast	
Kukulinna	Kuckulin	
Kullamaa	Goldenbeck	
Kuremäe	Püchtitsa	
Kuressaare	Arensburg	
Kursi	Talkhof	
Kuusalu	Kuusal	
Lagedi	Laakt	
Lahmuse	Lachmes	
Laitse	Laitzen	
Laiuse	Lais	
Lasile	Lassile	
Laulasmaa	Laulasma	
Lehtse	Lechts	
Leisi	Laisberg	
Lihula	Leal	
Liigvalla	Löwenwalde	
Lohu	Loal	
Lohusuu	Lohusu	
Loksa	Loxa	
Loo	Neuenhof	
Lüganuse	Luggenhusen	
Luke	Lugden	
Lümandu	Limmat	
Lustivere	Lustifer	
Luunja	Lunja	
Maardu	Maart	
Maardu	Udiküll	
Maarjamäe	Marienberg	
Maarjamäe	Strietberg	
Mäekula	Mähküll	
Mäetaguse	Mehntack	
Maidla	Maydel	
Männiku	Mönnikorb	
Mäo	Mecshof	
Märjamaa	Merjama	
Martna	St. Martens	
Massu	Massau	
Matsalu	Matzal	
Meeski	Mecks	
Mehikoorma	Mehikorem	
Merimesta	Seewald	
Mõdriku	Mödders	
Mõigu	Moik	
Mõisaküla	Moiseküll	
Mõniste	Mentzen	
Mooste	Moisekatz	
Muhu	Mohn	
Munamägi	Munnamäggi	
Muraste	Morras	
Mustjala	Mustel	
Mustla	Mustlanöm	
Mustvee	Tschorna	
Muuga	Münkenhof	
Nabala	Nappel	
Naissaar	Nargen	
Narva-Jõesuu	Hungerburg	
Navesti	Nawwast	
Neeruti	Megel	
Nehatu	Nehhat	
Noarootsi	Nukkö	
Nõo	Nüggen	
Nõva	Newe	
Nurme	Nurms	
Ohtu	Ocht	
Õisu	Euseküll	
Olustvere	Ollustfer	
Orissaare	Orrisaar	
Oru	Orrenhof	
Osmussaar	Odinsholm	
Otepää	Odenpäh	
Pada	Paddas	
Pädaste	Peddast	
Paeküla	Paenküll	
Paide	Weissenstein	
Paistu	Paistel	
Pakri	Rogö	
Pala	Palla	
Palamuse	Bartholomäi	
Paldiski	Baltischport	
Palivere	Pallifer	
Paljassaare	Karls Insel	
Pandivere	Pantifer	
Painiidu	Papen-Wiek	
Parila	Pergel	
Pärnu	Pernau	
Paslepa	Paschlep	
Paunküla	Paunküll	
Pedassaar	Peddasaar	
Peningi	Penningby	
Piirissaar	Porka	
Piirissaar	Pirisaar	
Pirita	Brigitten	
Pirita	Mariendal	
Pirita	Strandorte	
Pöide	Peude	
Põllküla	Pöllküll	
Põltsamaa	Oberpahlen	
Põlva	Pölwe	
Pootsi	Potzik	
Porkuni	Borkholm	
Prangli	Neu-Wrangelshof	
Püha	Pyha	
Pühajärve	Pühhajerv	
Pühajõe	Pühhajoggi	
Pühalepa	Pühhalep	
Puhja	Cawelecht	
Pühtitsa	Pühtitz	
Puka	Bockenhof	
Purila	Purgel	
Püssi	Neu-Isenhof	
Raadi	Ratshof	
Rääma	Ravassar	
Raasiku	Rasik	
Rägavere	Reggafer	
Raikküla	Raiküll	
Rakvere	Wesenberg	
Randvere	Randfer	
Ranna-Pungerja	Ranna-Pungern	
Rannu	Randen	
Räpina	Reppin	
Rapla	Reppel	
Reigi	Roicks	
Ridala	Röthel	
Riidaja	Morsel-Podrigel	
Riisipere	Riesenberg	
Risti	Kreuz	
Roela	Ruil	
Rõngu	Ringen	
Rooküla	Rohküll	
Roosa	Rosenhof	
Rõuge	Rauge	
Ruhnu	Runö	
Ruila	Ruil	
Rutikvere	Ruttigfer	
Ruusmäe	Rogosinki	
Saadjärve	Sadjerw	
Saarde	Saarahof	
Saare	Sarenhof	
Saaremaa	Ösel	
Sagadi	Saggad	
Saha	Saage	
Saku	Sack	
Salutaguse	Sallentacken	
Sangaste	Theal	
Saue	Friedrichshof	
Sikeldi	Siklecht	
Sillamäe	Kannoka	
Sillamäe	Sillamägi	
Sindi	Zintenhof	
Sõmerpalu	Sommerpahlen	
Sutlepa	Sutlap	
Suure-Jaani	Groß St. Johannis	
Suuremõisa	Magnushof	
Suur-Pakri	Groß Rogoe	
Taagepera	Wagenküll	
Taebla	Taibel	
Taheva	Taiwola	
Tahkuranna	Tackerort	
Tähtvere	Techelfer	
Tallinn	Reval	
Tamsalu	Tamsal	
Tapa	Taps	
Tartu	Dorpat	
Tarvastu	Tarwast	
Tiskre	Tischer	
Tõdva	Tedva	
Tõlliste	Teilitiz	
Torgu	Torkenhof	
Tori	Torgel	
Tõrva	Törwa	
Tõstama	Testama	
Tsooru	Soorhof	
Tuhala	Toal	
Tuhalaane	Tuhhalaane	
Türi	Turgel	
Türi-Alliku	Allenküll	
Uderna	Uddern	
Udriku	Uddrich	
Uhtna	Uchten	
Ülgase	Ilgas	
Urvaste	Antzen	
Urvaste	Urbs	
Uuemõisa	Neuenhof	
Väätze	Wätz	
Vahastu	Wahhast	
Väikue-Maarje	Klein-Marien	
Väike-Pakri	Klein-Royö	
Vainupea	Wainupä	
Valga	Walk	
Valjala	Wolde	
Valkla	Wallküll	
Valtu	Waldau	
Vändra	Alt-Fennern	
Varbla	Werpel	
Vasalemma	Wasselem	
Vasnarva	Serenitz	
Vasnarva	Wichtisby	
Vastseliina	Neuhausen	
Vastemõisa	Wastemois	
Vatla	Wattel	
Veroria	Paulenhof	
Vigala	Fickel	
Vihula	Viol	
Viimsi	Wiems	
Viljandi	Fellin	
Virtsu	Werder	
Võhma	Wöchma	
Võisiku	Woisek	
Võnnu	Wendau	
Vopsu	Wöbs	
Vormsi	Worms	
Võru	Werro	
Võsu	Vasso	
Võtikvere	Wotikfer	

== See also ==
- German exonyms
- List of European exonyms
- List of German exonyms for places in Latvia
