= List of German exonyms for places in Denmark =

Below is list of German language exonyms for places in Denmark. This article does not include spelling changes with the same rough pronunciation, names spelled alike, and the predictable spelling changes shown below:

- -ager → -agger
- -bjerg → -berg
- -bøl → -büll
- -borg → -burg
- -havn → -hagen
- -lev → -leff
- -sted → -stedt
- -ved → -vedt

== List of names ==
Denmark Dänemark
English name	Danish name	German name	Notes
Aabenraa	Åbenrå	Apenrade	
Åbæk		Aubeck	
Åbøl		Aubel	
Adsbøl		Atzböll	
Årø By		Aaröby	
Årslev		Arsleben	
Asserballe		Atzerballig	
Åved		Auwitt	
Avnbøl		Altenböll	
Bådsbøl		Bodsböll	
Bevtoft		Beftoft	
Bjerndrup		Behrendorf	
Bjolderup		Biolderup	
Bolderslev		Boldersleben	
Brændstrup		Brendstrup	
Bredevad		Bredewatt	
Broager		Broacker	
Burkal		Buhrkal	
Copenhagen	København	Kopenhagen	
Dybbøl		Düppel	
Dyrhus		Dürhaus	
Egernsund		Ekensund	
Emmerlav		Emmerleff	
Fårhus		Schafhaus	
Fole		Fohl	
Frøslev		Fröslee	
Fynshav		Fühnenshaff	
Gabøl		Gabel	
Gallehus		Gallehuus	
Gånsager		Gonsagger	
Gejlå		Gehlau	
Gjenner		Genner	
Gram		Gramm	
Haderslev		Hadersleben	
Hardeshøj		Hardeshoi	
Hjerpsted		Jerpstedt	
Hjordkær		Jordkirch	
Høgslund		Hoxlund	
Højer		Hoyer	
Holbøl		Hollebüll	
Høruphav		Hörup	
Hovslund		Haberslund	
Hviding		Widding	
Jegerup		Jägerup	
Jersdal		Jerstal	
Jyndevad		Jündewatt	
Kær		Kjär	
Kegnæs		Kekenis	
Kelstrup Strand		Seelust	
Kongsmark		Königsmark	
Korup		Quorp	
Kravlund		Kraulund	
Kruså		Krusau	
Kværs		Quars	
Løgumgårde		Lügumgarde	
Løgumkloster		Lügumkloster	
Løjt Kirkeby		Loitkirkeby	
Lysabild		Lyssabel	
Magstrup		Maugstrup	
Mjolden		Medolden	
Møgeltønder		Mögeltondern	
Nordborg		Norburg	
Ørby		Orby	
Øster Terp		Osterterp	
Padborg		Pattburg	
Ravsted		Rapstedt	
Rens		Renz	
Ribe		Ripen	
Rinkenæs		Rinkenis	
Rødding		Redding	
Rødekro		Rothenkrug	
Rømø		Röm	
Rørkær		Rohrkärr	
Rudbøll		Rudebüll	
Skærbæk		Scherrebeck	
Skast		Schads	
Skodborg		Schottburg	
Sønderby		Sünderby	
Sønderhav		Süderhaff	
Sønder Hygum		Hügum	
Stubbæk		Stübbek	
Styrtom		Störtom	
Tiset		Thiset	
Tønder		Tondern	
Uge		Uk	
Ullerup		Ulderp	
Varnæs		Warnitz	
Vester Sottrup		Sattrup	
Visby		Wiesby	
Vojens		Woyens	

== See also ==
- German exonyms
- List of European exonyms
