= List of German place names in Switzerland =

This is list of German language exonyms for places in multilingual and fully non-German-speaking areas of Switzerland.

== Complete list of names ==
Switzerland Schweiz
Local name	Swiss place		German name	Notes
Local name	Name	Language	German name	Notes
Agno		Italian	Eng	
Aigle		French	Älen	
Airolo		Italian	Albersweil	
Airolo		Italian	Eirels	
Airolo		Italian	Eriels	
All'Acqua		Italian	Wasser	
Albeuve		French	Weisbach	
Alle		French	Hall	
Altanca		Italian	Aldank	
Ambri		Italian	Lumbri	
Andiast		Romansh	Andest	Italian: Andesto
Anzonico		Italian	Anzonig	
Anzonico		Italian	Anzuneg	
Aranno		Italian	Arain	
Arogno		Italian	Arungen	
Arconciel		French	Ergenzach	
Arosio		Italian	Aruxen	
Arvigo		Italian	Arwich	
Arzo		Italian	Arzen	
Ascona		Italian	Aschgunen	
Astano		Italian	Astein	
Asuel		French	Hasenburg	
Auressio		Italian	Orassen	
Aurigeno		Italian	Fredscha	
Autigny		French	Ottenach	
Avegno		Italian	Wengen	
Avenches		French	Wifflisburg	
Bagnes		French	Bangis	
Balerna		Italian	Balern	
Balerna		Italian	Barern	
Balerno		Italian	Balern	
Balerno		Italian	Palerm	
Banco		Italian	Bangen	
Barbengo		Italian	Barbingen	
Barberêche		French	Bärfischen	
Bassecourt		French	Altdorf	
Bedano		Italian	Bedein	
Bedigliora		Italian	Bedeleir	
Bedretto		Italian		
Bedretto		Italian	Bedereit	
Belfaux		French	Gumschen	
Bellinzona		Italian	Bellenz	
Belprahon		French	Tiefenbach	
Berlincourt		French	Berlinsdorf	
Bernina		Italian	Barning	
Berzona		Italian	Berzun	
Besazio		Italian	Bisatz	
Beurnevésin		French	Brischwiler	
Bévilard		French	Bewiler	
Bex		French	Beis	
Biasca		Italian	Abläsch	
Biasca		Italian	Ablentsch(en)	
Bidogno		Italian	Bladen	
Bienne		French	Biel	
Bignasco		Italian	Binieschen	
Bioggio		Italian	Bietsch	
Biogna		Italian	Bring	
Bironica		Italian	Birunig	
Bissone		Italian	Bissen	
Bissone		Italian	Byssen	
Blenio		Italian	Bollenz	
Bodio		Italian	Boid	
Boécourt		French	Biestingen	
Bogno		Italian	Bonien	
Bondo		Italian	Bondth	
Boncourt		French	Bubendorf	
Bonfol		French	Pumpfel	
Bonnefontaine		French	Muffethan	
Borgonone		Italian	Brunien	
Borgonovo		Italian	Burgnau	
Bosco		Italian	Gurin	
Botterens		French	Botteringen	
Boujean		French	Bözingen	Part of Bienne
Bourg-Saint-Pierre		French	Sankt-Petersburg	
Bourrignon		French	Bürkis	
Bovernier		French	Birnier	
Bregaglia		Italian	Bergell	
Breganzona		Italian	Brigenz	
Breno		Italian	Brin	
Brissago		Italian	Bris(s)a(ch)	
Broc		French	Bruck	
Brontalio		Italian	Brunntal	
Brusino Arsizio		Italian	Brussin	
Brusio		Italian	Brüs	
Bulle		French	Boll	
Buseno		Italian	Busen	
Cademario		Italian	Cadtme	
Cademario		Italian	Gadme	
Cadenazzo		Italian	Kadnetsch	
Cadro		Italian	Kadern	
Calonico		Italian	Gilonig	
Calpiogna		Italian	Kalplun	
Caminada		Italian	Giminada	
Camorino		Italian	Camertin	
Campidogno		Italian	Kampidaun	
Campo Blenio		Italian	Campen	
Campo Maggiatal		Italian	Caam	
Capolago		Italian	Godlag	
Capolago		Italian	Gotlag	
Carabietta		Italian	Cawrida	
Carona		Italian	Garung	
Castagnola		Italian	Kastanienbaum	
Castasegna		Italian	Castasengen	
Castione		Italian	Castalien	
Castrisch		Romansh	Kästris	
Catto		Italian	Chatt	
Cavagnano		Italian	Kawenach	
Cavergno		Italian	Kaffring	
Cerentino		Italian	Tscharantin	
Cerniat		French	Scherni	
Cevio		Italian	Tschewa	
Chalais		French	Schalei	
Chamoson		French	Tschamboss	
Charmey		French	Galmis	
Charmoille		French	Kalmis	
Châtel-sur-Montsalvens		French	Kastels	
Châtillon		French	Kastel	
Chevenez		French	Kevenach	
Chiasso		Italian	Pias	
Chiasso		Italian	Schäss	
Chiggiogna		Italian	Cuschinäni	
Chiggiogna		Italian	Gischöngen	
Chippis		French	Zippis	
Chironico		Italian	K(ir)onig	
Choindez		French	Schwende	
Cimalmotto		Italian	Zimmelmutt	
Clar Faifo		Italian	Pfaid	
Clar Faifo		Italian	Pfait	
Claro		Italian	Crar	
Claro		Italian	Grag	
Coglio		Italian	Cüinn	
Collinasca		Italian	Zu(r)walken	
Conthey		French	Gundis	
Corban		French	Bettendorf	
Corbières		French	Korberers	
Corino		Italian	Gurin	
Cormagens		French	Cormasing	
Cormérod		French	Kormerat	
Corminboeuf		French	Sankt Jörg	
Cornaux		French	Curnau	
Cornol		French	Gundelsdorf	
Cottens		French	Cottingen	
Courchapoix		French	Gebsdorf	
Courchavon		French	Vogtsburg	
Courcelon		French	Sollendorf	
Courgenay		French	Jennsorf	
Courgevaux		French	Gurwolf	
Courlevon		French	Kurlevon	
Cournillens		French	Kurlin	
Courrendlin		French	Rennendorf	
Courroux		French	Lüttelsdorf	
Courtételle		French	Cortittel	
Cressier		French	Grissach	
Cressier		French	Grissach	
Crocifisso		Italian	Kruzifix	
Croglio		Italian	Krohl	
Cumbel		Romansh	Cumbels	
Cunter		Romansh	Cunters im Oberhalbstein	Italian: Contra
Cureglia		Italian	Cureil	
Curia		Italian	Chuyr	
Degen		Romansh	Igels	
Delémont		French	Delsberg	
Develier		French	Dietwiler	
Diess		French	Tess	
District d'Hérens		French	Bezirk Ering	
Donat (Donato)		Romansh (Italian)	Donath	
Dongio		Italian	Denntsch	
Dongio		Italian	Deuntz	
Dongio		Italian	Döntsch	
Échallens		French	Tscherlitz	
Echarlens		French	Scharlingen	
Enney		French	Zum Schnee	
Envelier		French	Weiler	
Epagnier		French	Spaniz	
Eschert		French	Eschendorf	
Espendes		French	Spinz	
Essert		French	Ried	
Estavannens		French	Estavanning	
Estavayer-le-Lac		French	Stäffis am See	
Faido		Italian	Pfait, Pfayd	
Faido		Italian	Feit	
Falera		Romansh	Fellers	
Faoug		French	Pfauen	
Ferpicloz		French	Picheln	
Fescoggia		Italian	Feschoy	
Frasco		Italian	Ferlasch	
Fregiécourt		French	Fridlinsdorf	
Fribourg		French	Freiburg im Üechtland	
Frinvilier		French	Fridlinsschwanden	
Fully		French	Füllien	
Fusio		Italian	Füsch	
Gandria		Italian	Gander(ei)	
Geneva	Genève	French	Genf	
Gentilino		Italian	Gentlin	
Ghirone		Italian	Agairen	
Giornico		Italian	Irnos	
Giubiasco		Italian	Siebenäsch	
Giubiasco		Italian	Zibiasg	
Giumaglio		Italian	Tschumaa	
Givisiez		French	Siebenzach	
Glovelier		French	Lietingen	
Gondo		Italian	Gunz	
Gondo		Italian	Ruden	
Gordevio		Italian	Gurde(r)f	
Gordevio		Italian	Guriner	
Gordevio		Italian	Guyrdorf	
Gorduno		Italian	Gurdaun	
Grandfontaine		French	Langenbrunn	
Grandson		French	Grandsee	
Grandval		French	Granfelden	
Grandvillard		French	Grosswiler	
Granges		French	Gradetsch	
Granges-Paccot		French	Zur Schüren	
Gravesano		Italian	Gravisan	
Grimisuat		French	Grimseln	
Grisons	Grischun	Romansh	Graubünden	
Grône		French	Grün	
Gruyères		French	Greyerz	
Gudo		Italian	Guden	
Gumefens		French	Gümefingen	
Hauterive		French	Altenryf	
Hérémence		French	Amensi	
Hérémence		French	Ermenz	
Intragna		Italian	Intran	
Intragna		Italian	Intron	
Iragna		Italian	Yreuntz	
Isone		Italian	Issun	
Isone		Italian	Son	
Isone		Italian	Yschjun	
Isorno		Italian	Isurn	
Jura		French	Jurn	
La Neuveville		French	Neuenstadt	
La Roche		French	Zur Flüh	
Lamboing		French	Lamlingen	
Lamone		Italian	Lamen	
Largario		Italian	Larger	
Lausanne		French	Losanen	
Lavertezzo		Italian	Lauertitz	
Lavorgo		Italian	Lawurg	
Le Landeron		French	Landern	
Leggia		Italian	Lesch	
Lens		French	Leis	
Leontica		Italian	Lawunting	
Leontica		Italian	Lewunting	
Le Pâquier		French	Rinderweide	
Lessoc		French	Lissingen	
Leysin		French	Leissins	
Ligornetto		Italian	Legurnet	
Lignières		French	Lineri	
Linesco		Italian	Lenatsch	
Locarno		Italian	Liggarasch	
Locarno		Italian	Lucaris	
Locarno		Italian	Luggarn	
Locarno		Italian	Luggarus	
Loco		Italian	Loch	
Lodano		Italian	Läda	
Lodano		Italian	Ludan	
Loderio		Italian	Laudern	
Lodrino		Italian	Ludrin	
Loèches-les-Baines		French	Leukerbad	
Lopagno		Italian	Lupain	
Losone		Italian	Lossun	
Lottigna		Italian	Luthynien	
Lucens		French	Losingen	
Lucelle		French	Lützel	
Ludiano		Italian	Ludian	
Lugaggia		Italian	Lugätsch	
Lugaggia		Italian	Luggasch	
Lugano		Italian	Lau(w)is	
Lugano		Italian	Lowens	
Lugano		Italian	Löwwisch	
Lumino		Italian	Lomin	
Lumino		Italian	Lugmin	
Lumnezia		Romansh	Lugniz	
Lurengo		Italian	Lawreng	
Luven		Romansh	Luvis	Italian: Lovino
Magadino		Italian	Megadin	
Maggia		Italian	Maienthal	
Mairengo		Italian	Mayreng	
Malvaglia		Italian	Manglia	
Malvaglia		Italian	Malirabia	
Malvaglia		Italian	Malvalia	
Malvaglia		Italian	Manualia	
Marly		French	Mertenlach	
Marsens		French	Marsingen	
Martigny		French	Martinach	
Medel		Romansh	Medels im Oberland	
Medeglio		Italian	Medeil	
Medrisio		Italian	Mendris	
Mervelier		French	Morschwiler	
Mesocco		Italian	Misox	
Mettembert		French	Mettemberg	
Meyriez		French	Merlach	
Mezzovico-Vira		Italian	Mittervich-Wier	
Miécourt		French	Mieschdorf	
Miège		French	Miesen	
Minusio		Italian	Maniss	
Moghegno		Italian	Mugeng	
Molare		Italian	Molar	
Mon		Romansh	Mons	Italian: Maone/Mono
Montbovon		French	Bubenberg	
Monte Cenario		Italian	Montkenel	
Montepaglio		Italian	Paarlsberg	
Montsevelier		French	Mutzwiler	
Mont-Tramelan		French	Bergtramlingen	
Morcote		Italian	Morchy	
Morges		French	Morsee	
Mosogno		Italian	Moseng	
Morlon		French	Morlach	
Motto		Italian	Mutt	
Moudon		French	Milden	
Moutier		French	Münster	
Movelier		French	Moderschwil	
Mugena		Italian	Mutzen	
Mulegns		Romansh	Mühlens	Italian: Molini
Neirivue		French	Schwarzwasser	
Nendaz		French	Neind(t)	
Neuchâtel		French	Neuenburg	
Neyruz		French	Rauschenbach	
Nods		French	Nos	
Novaggio		Italian	Nowatsch	
Olivone		Italian	Luorscha	
Olivone		Italian	Oblivone	
Olivone		Italian	Orivoy(o)	
Onnens		French	Onningen	
Onsernone		Italian	Lizernon	
Orbe		French	Orbach	
Ormont-Dessus		French	Ormund	
Orvin		French	Ilflingen	
Osogne		Italian	Ulonia	
Osogne		Italian	Usonia	
Osogne		Italian	Usonien	
Passo del Lucomagno		Italian	Lukmanierpass	
Payern		French	Peterlingen	
Pazzallo		Italian	Patzal	
Pedipodi		Italian	Zublatta	
Pedrinate		Italian	Pedernat	
Perrefitte		French	Pfeffert	
Péry		French	Büderich	
Pianezzo		Italian	Planetz	
Piano		Italian	Plan	
Pigniu		Romansh	Panix	Italian: Pignono
Pinetto		Italian	Fichtenwald	
Piotta		Italian	Piotten	
Plagne		French	Pleen	
Pleigne		French	Pleen	
Poggio		Italian	Anhöhe	
Pollegio		Italian	Bollenz	
Pollegio		Italian	Polentz	
Pollegio		Italian	Polen(t)sch	
Polleggio		Italian	Klösterli	
Polleggio		Italian	Polletsch	
Pleujouse		French	Blitzhausen	
Pont-la-Ville		French	Ponnendorf	
Ponte Brolla		Italian	Zuschmitten	
Ponte Tresa		Italian	Treis(bruck)	
Ponto Valentino		Italian	Bont	
Ponto Valentino		Italian	Bünt	
Ponto Valentino		Italian	Pont	
Ponto Valentino		Italian	Punt	
Porrentruy		French	Pruntrut	
Poschiavo		Italian	Puschlav	
Praroman		French	Perroman	
Prêles		French	Prägels	
Primadegno		Italian	Premerdling	
Prosito		Italian	Proxide(r)n	
Punta del Castel		Italian	Kastelhorn	
Pura		Italian	Purren	
Quinto		Italian	Quint im Livinental	
Rebeuvelier		French	Rippertswil	
Rebévelier		French	Ruppertswiler	
Recolaine		French	Riklingen	
Reconvilier		French	Rockwiler	
Renan		French	Rennan	
Riaz		French	Zum Rad	
Riddes		French	Riden	
Riedes-Dessus		French	Oberreiderwald	
Roche-d'Or		French	Goldenfels	
Romont		French	Rothmunt	
Ronco		Italian	Rungg	
Ronco		Italian	Rüngg	
Ronco sopra Ascona		Italian	Rodung ob Aschgunen	
Rossemaison		French	Rottmund	
Rossens		French	Rossingen	
Rossura		Italian	Rossur	
Rougemont		French	Retschmund	
Roveredo		Italian	Roffle	
Roveredo		Italian	Roferit	
Roveredo		Italian	Rufreit	
Sagogn		Romansh	Sagens	Italian: Secagno/Segogno
Saint-Blaise		French	Sankt Blasien	
Saint-Imier		French	Sankt Imier	
Saint-Ursanne		French	Sankt Ursitz	
Salouf		Romansh	Salux	Italian: Salugo/Salucco
Salvan		French	Scharwang	
Savièse		French	Safiesch	
Savognin		Romansh	Schweiningen	Italian: Savognino
Schluein		Romansh	Schleuis	Italian: Slovegno
Seleute		French	Schelten	
Sembrancher		French	Sankt-Brancher	
Seseglio		Italian	Sitzeil	
Siat		Romansh	Seth	
Sierre		French	Siders	
Sion		French	Sitten	
Soazza		Italian	Sowaz	
Soazza		Italian	Zauatz	
Soglio		Italian	Sils im Bergell	
Someo		Italian	Sumee	
Sorens		French	Schoringen	
Sornetan		French	Sornethal	
Sorvilier		French	Surbeln	
Soulce		French	Sulz	
Soyhières		French	Saugern	
Spruga		Italian	Sprugg	
Sevgein		Romansh	Seewis im Oberland	Italian: Savienno
Stierva		Romansh	Stürvis	Italian: Stirvia
Sumvitg		Romansh	Somvix	Italian: Sonvico/Sommovico
Tavannes		French	Dachsfelden	
Taverne		Italian	Thürrenmüly	
Teglio		Italian	Theil	
Tengia		Italian	Täntsch	Archaic
Tengia		Italian	Teyschen	
Thielle		French	Häusern-Wabern	
Tramelan		French	Tramlingen	
Tremona		Italian	Trenere	
Treyvaux		French	Treffels	
Trun		Romansh	Truns	Italian: Tronte
Tujetsch		Romansh	Tavetsch	Italian: Tovieggio
Undervelier		French	Untewiler	
Valais		French	Wallis	
Valle de Blenio		Italian	Bollenztal	
Valle de Blenio		Italian	Pallenzertal	
Valle Leventina		Italian	Livinental	
Valle Maggia		Italian	Maiental	
Valle Riviera		Italian	Reffier	
Vauffelin		French	Füglisthal	
Vauffelin		French	Wölflingen	
Vaulruz		French	Thalbach	
Vella		Romansh	Villa	
Vendincourt		French	Wendelinsdorf	
Venthône		French	Venthlen	
Verdabbio		Italian	Vertapl	
Vermes		French	Pferdmund	
Vevey		French	Vivis	
Vezia		Italian	Weetz	
Vicosoprano		Italian	Vespran	
Vicques		French	Wix	
Viganello		Italian	Vigonel	
Vignogn		Romansh	Vigens	
Vignola		Italian	Weinberg	
Villarepos		French	Ruppertswil	
Villars-sous-Mont		French	Wiler am Berg	
Vollèges		French	Village	
Vorbourg		French	Vorburg	
Viully		French	Wistenlach	
Vuadens		French	Wüdingen	
Vuipens		French	Wippingen	
Yverdon		French	Ifferten	

== See also ==
- German exonyms
- List of European exonyms
