= Krakauer (disambiguation) =

Krakauer or Krakouer is a surname.

Krakauer may also refer to:

- Bierschinken sausage
- Kraków sausage
- Krakauer Brothers, American piano manufacturer
