= Michelbouch =

Village in Vichten, Luxembourg

Coordinates: 49°49′N 6°01′E

Michelbouch (Luxembourg)

Michelbouch (Luxembourgish: Méchelbuch) is a village in the commune of Vichten, in central Luxembourg. As of September 2026, the village has a population of 185.
