= Bollendorf =

- Municipality
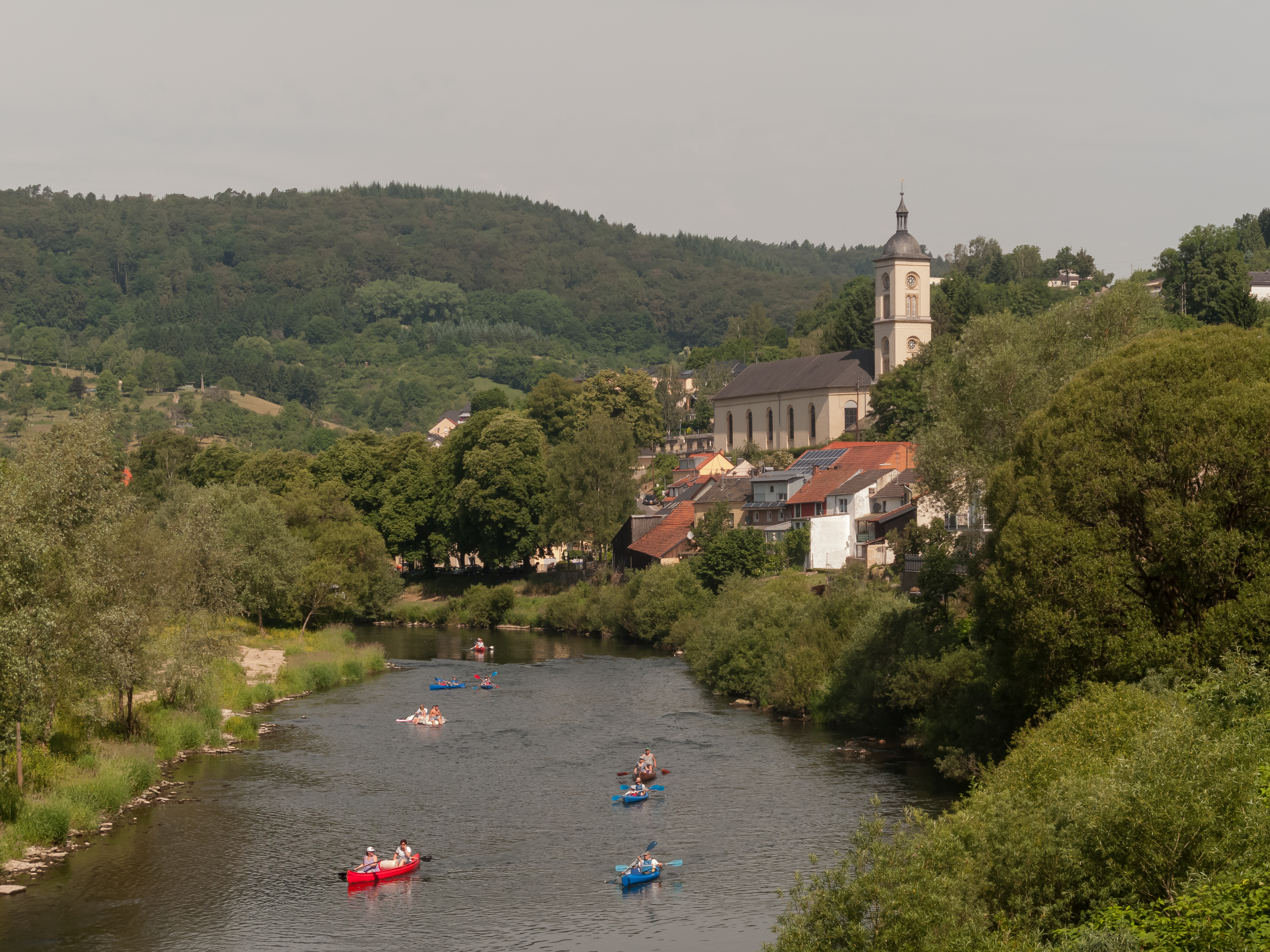

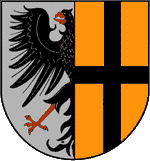
- Coat of arms

- Location of Bollendorf within Eifelkreis Bitburg-Prüm district
- Interactive map of Bollendorf
- Location within Germany Location within Rhineland-Palatinate
- Coordinates: 49°51′11″N 06°21′42″E
- Country: Germany
- State: Rhineland-Palatinate
- District: Eifelkreis Bitburg-Prüm
- Municipal assoc.: Südeifel

Government
  - Mayor (2019–24): Silvia Hauer (CDU)

Area
  - Total: 13.15 km^{2} (5.08 sq mi)
- Elevation: 200 m (660 ft)

Population (2025-12-31)
  - Total: 1,638
  - Density: 124.6/km^{2} (322.6/sq mi)
- Time zone: UTC+01:00 (CET)
  - Summer (DST): UTC+02:00 (CEST)
- Postal codes: 54669
- Dialling codes: 06526
- Vehicle registration: BIT
- Website: www.bollendorf.de

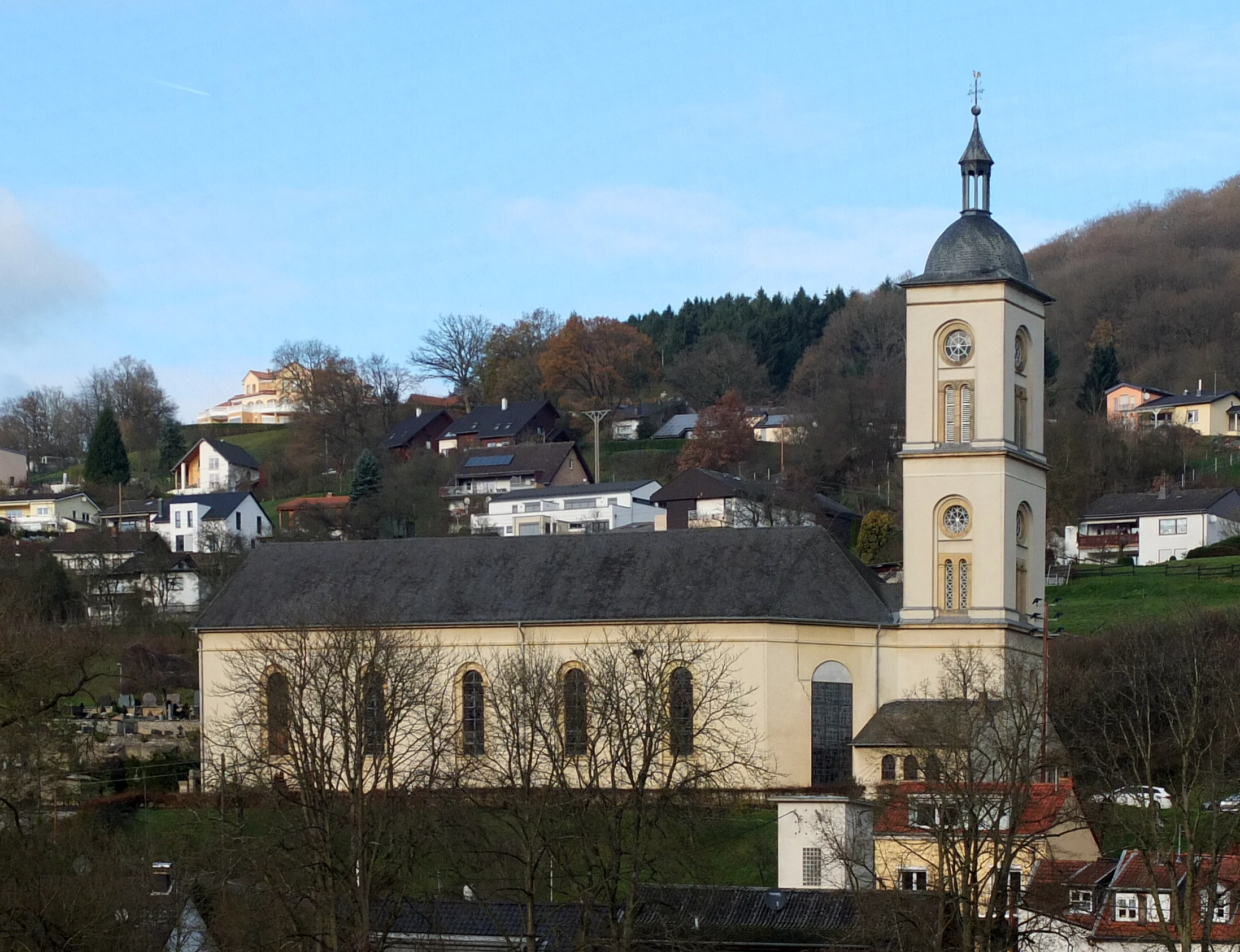
Catholic parish church Sankt Michael

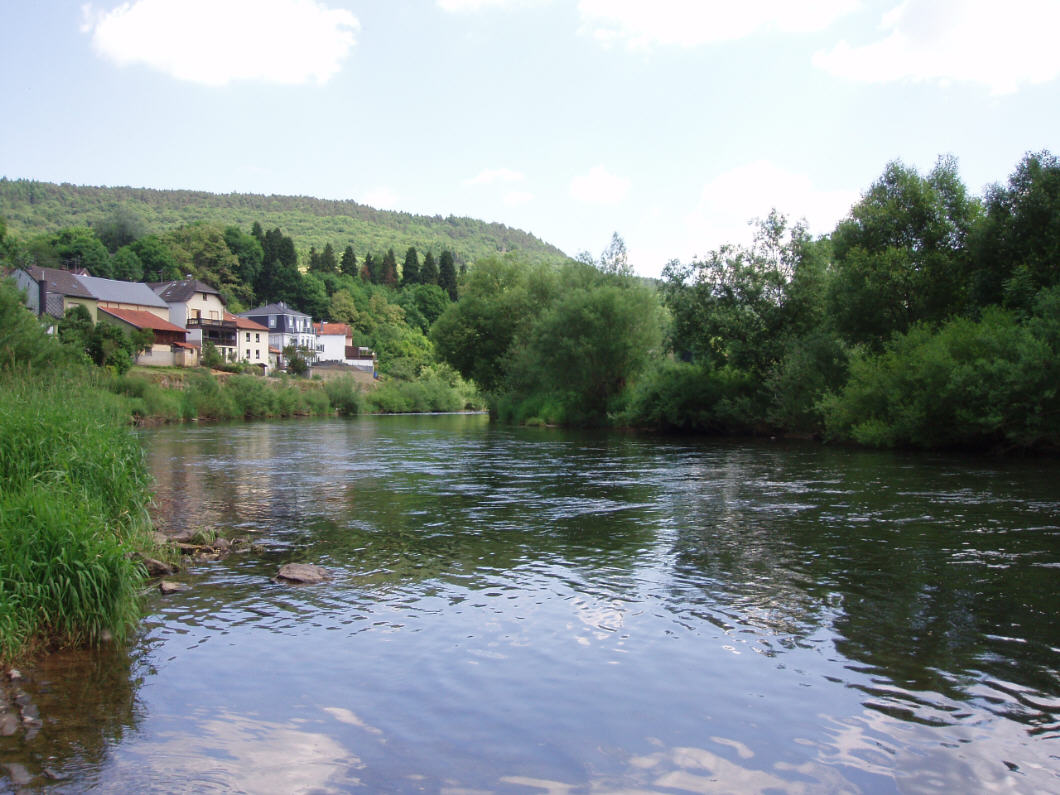
The Sauer in Bollendorf

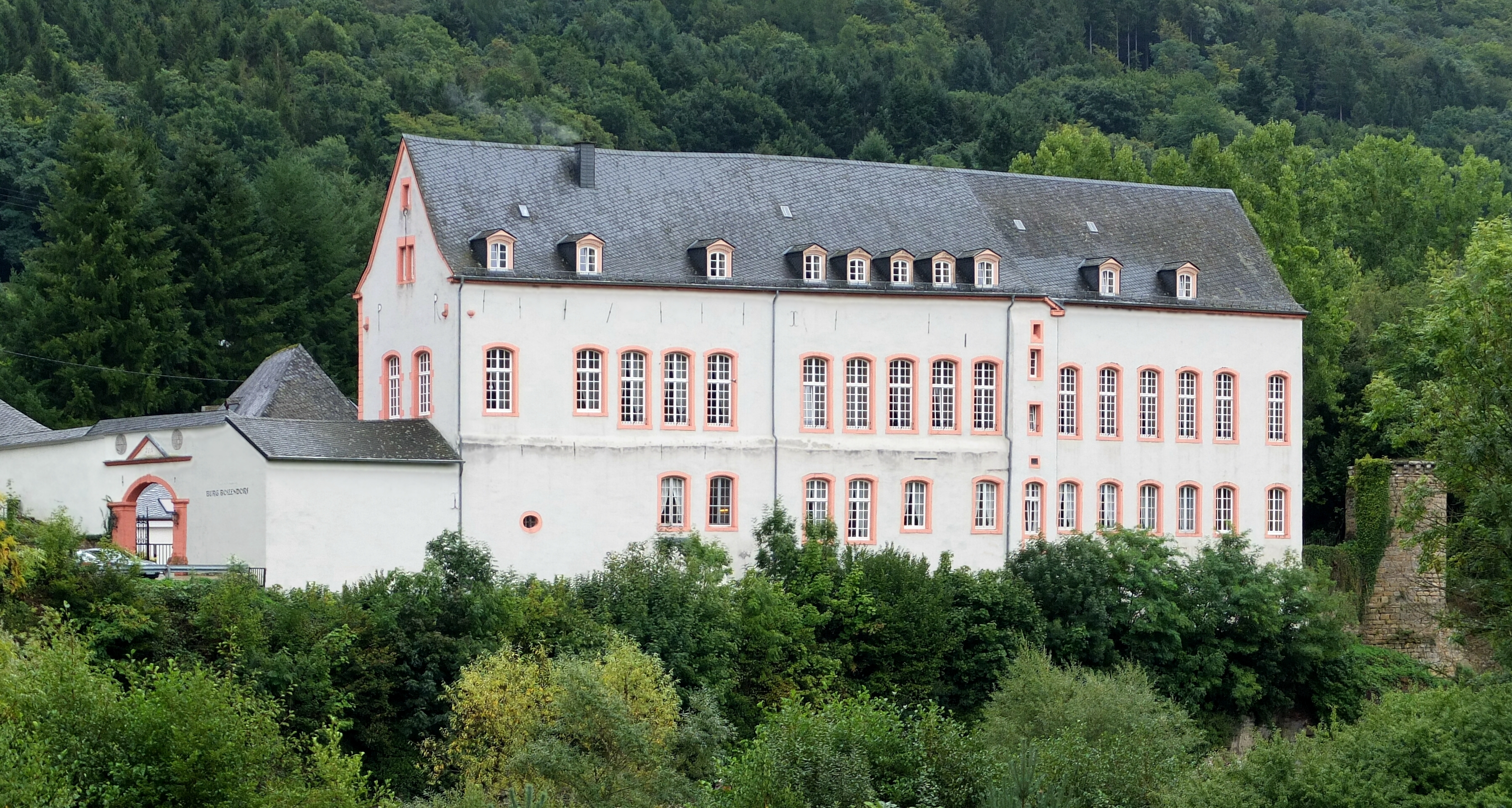
Bollendorf castle

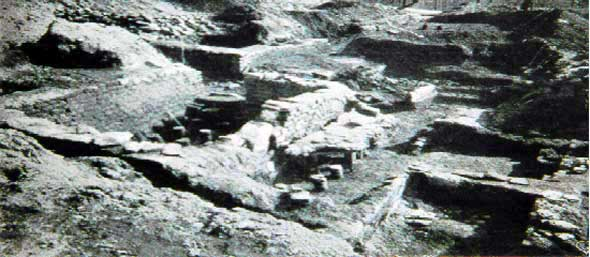
Villa rustica

Bollendorf is a German municipality in the state of Rhineland-Palatinate, located on the left bank of the Sauer river, opposite the Luxembourgish town of Bollendorf-Pont.
