= Roodt-sur-Syre =

Coordinates: 49°40′N 6°18′E

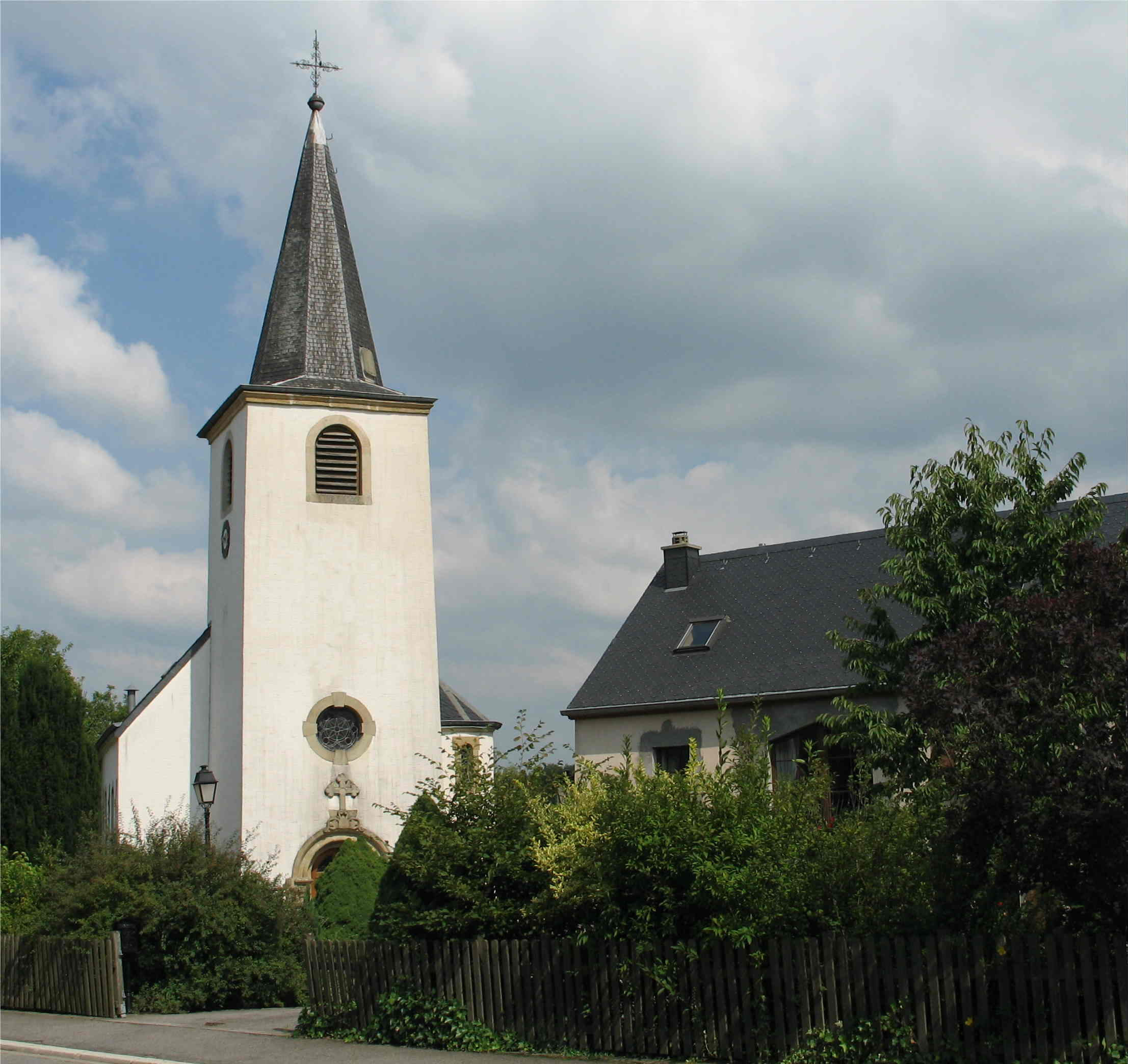
Roodt-sur-Syre church

Roodt-sur-Syre or Roodt-sur-Syr (Luxembourgish: Rued-Sir, German: Roodt/Syre) is a town in the commune of Betzdorf, in eastern Luxembourg, and about 15 km from Luxembourg City. As of September 2026, the town has a population of 1,981 inhabitants.

The town is the location of the Yemeni consulate in Luxembourg. Panelux, a large baked goods company, has production facilities on the outskirts of the town.
