= Izvoare, Sîngerei =

Izvoare
- Commune
- Location within Moldova
- Coordinates: 47.7163888889°N 28.1961111111°E
- Country: Moldova
- District: Sîngerei District

Population (2014)
  - Total: 853
- Time zone: UTC+2 (EET)
  - Summer (DST): UTC+3 (EEST)

Izvoare is a commune in Sîngerei District, Moldova. It is composed of two villages, Izvoare and Valea Norocului.
