= Blaschette =

Town in Lorentzweiler, Luxembourg

Coordinates: 49°42′N 6°10′E

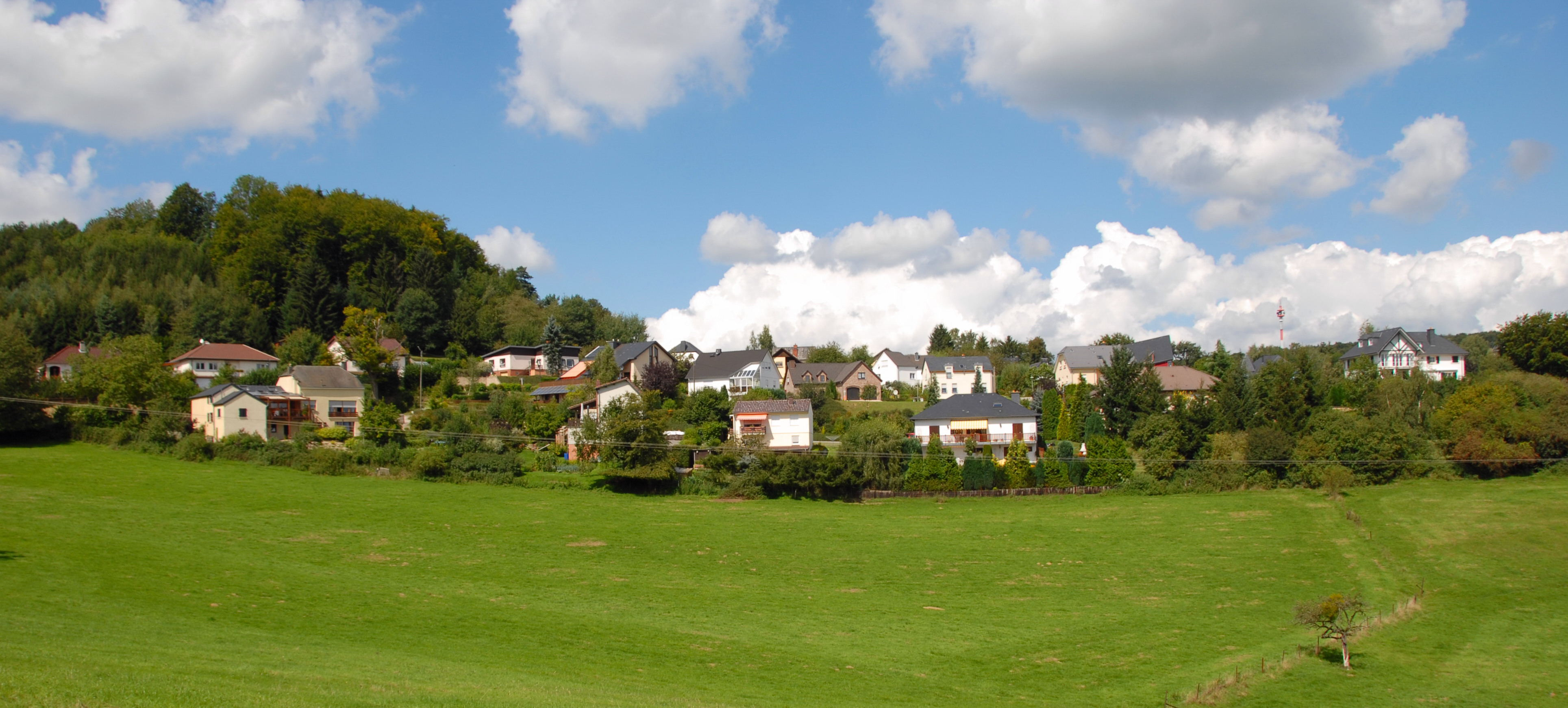
Blaaschent in 2007

Blaschette (French pronunciation: [blaʃɛt]; Luxembourgish: Blaaschent; German: Blascheid [ˈblaːʃaɪt]) is a small town in the commune of Lorentzweiler, in central Luxembourg. As of September 2026, it has a population of 510.
