= Stettiner =

Stettiner may refer to:

- Am Stettiner Haff, Amt in the district of Vorpommern-Greifswald, in Mecklenburg-Vorpommern, Germany
- Oscar Stettiner (1878-1948), British art dealer
- Stettiner SC, former German association football club from the city of Stettin
