= Eschette =

Luxembourgish hamlet

Coordinates: 49°49′22″N 05°53′12″E

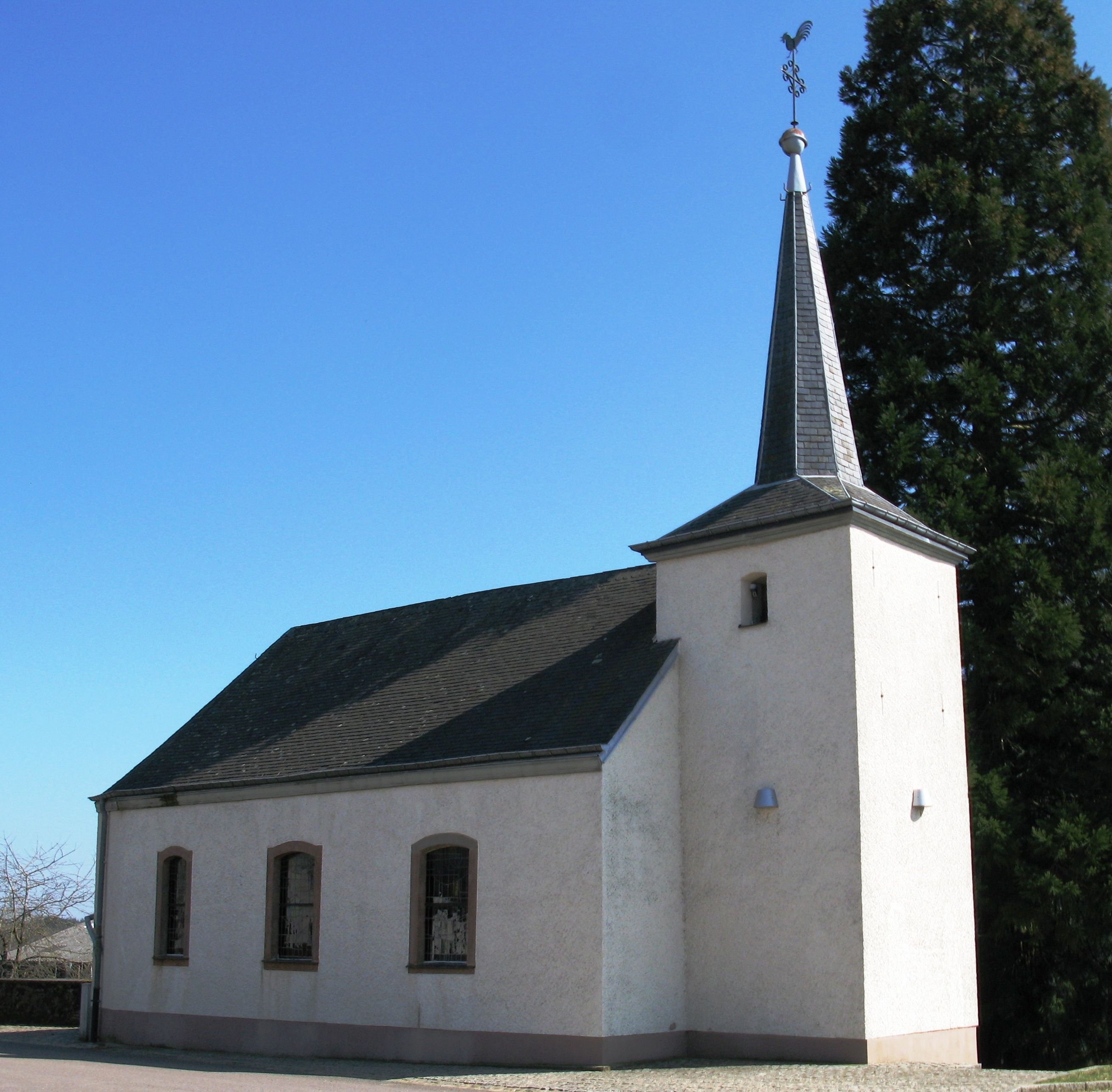
Chapelle Saint-Remacle

Eschette (Luxembourgish: Éischent) is a village in the commune of Rambrouch and the canton of Redange in western Luxembourg. As of 2026, it has 32 inhabitants.

The remains of Schorels Castle, an old fort, are located near Eschette.
