= List of German exonyms for places in Hungary =

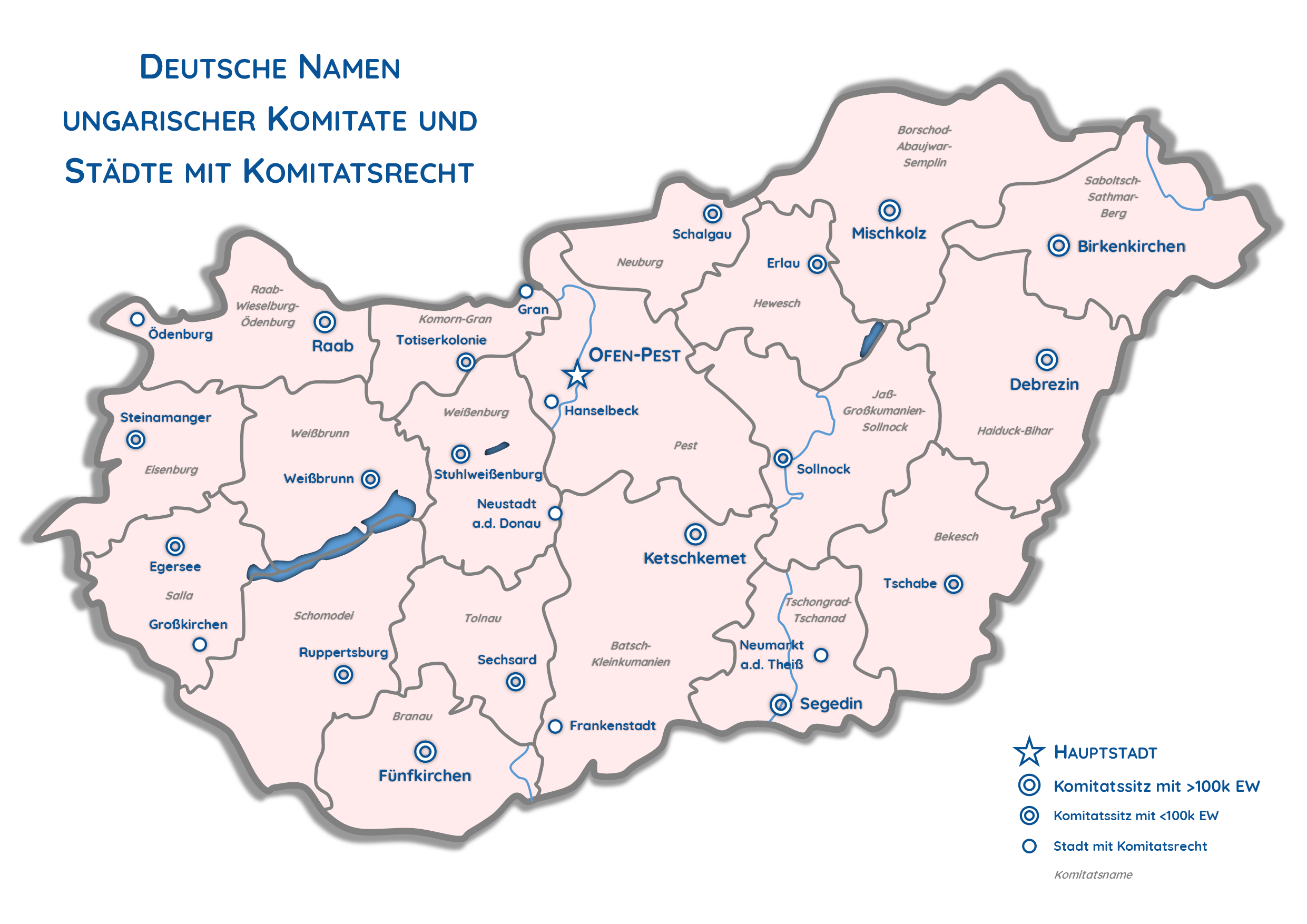
German names of Hungarian counties and cities with county rights

This is a list of German language exonyms for towns located in Hungary.

== Complete list ==
Hungary Ungarn
Hungarian place	German name	County	Notes
Ács	Atsch	Komárom-Esztergom	
Ágfalva	Agendorf	Győr-Moson-Sopron	
Agostyán	Augustin	Komárom-Esztergom	Part of Tata
Ajka	Eickau	Veszprém	
Ajkarendek	Eickaureindel	Veszprém	Part of Ajka
Albertfalva	Sachsenfeld	Budapest	
Albertkázmérpuszta	Albrecht-Kasimir	Győr-Moson-Sopron	Part of Várbalog
Alsószölnök	Unterzemming	Vas	
Angyalföld	Engelsfeld	Budapest	
Arak	Aracken	Győr-Moson-Sopron	Part of Halászi
Babarc	Bawaz	Baranya	
Bácsalmás	Almasch	Bács-Kiskun	
Bácsbokod	Wikitsch	Bács-Kiskun	
Baja	Baje	Bács-Kiskun	
Baja	Frankenstadt	Bács-Kiskun	
Balf	Wolfs	Győr-Moson-Sopron	Part of Sopron
Bakonygyepes	Jepsching	Veszprém	
Bakonygyirót	Jierot	Veszprém	
Bakonyjákó	Jaka	Veszprém	
Bakonynána	Nana	Veszprém	
Bakonyszentiván	Santiwan	Veszprém	
Bakonyszücs	Sitsch	Veszprém	
Bátaapáti	Apadi	Tolna	
Bátaszék	Badeseck	Tolna	
Békásmegyer	Krottendorf	Budapest	
Békés	Bekesch	Békés	
Belváros	Innenstadt	Budapest	
Berkenye	Berkine	Nógrád	
Besfa	Wischdorf	Győr-Moson-Sopron	
Bezenye	Pallersdorf	Győr-Moson-Sopron	
Biatorbágy	Wia-Klein Turwall	Pest	
Bódé	Wuding	Veszprém	
Bóly	Bohl	Baranya	
Bonyhád	Bonnhard	Tolna	
Börcs	Rundenturm	Győr-Moson-Sopron	
Borjád	Burjad	Baranya	
Bozsof	Poschendorf	Vas	
Bozzai	Bosau	Győr-Moson-Sopron	
Brennbergbánya	Brennberg	Győr-Moson-Sopron	Part of Sopron
Buda	Ofen	Budapest	
Budafok	Promontor	Budapest	
Budajenő	Jeine	Pest	
Budakeszi	Wudigess	Pest	
Budaörs	Wudersch	Pest	
Budatétény	Klein-Teting	Budapest	
Bük	Wichs	Vas	
Cák	Zackenbach	Vas	
Ceglédbercel	Berzel	Pest	
Császartöltés	Tschasatet	Bács-Kiskun	
Csátalja	Tschatali	Bács-Kiskun	
Csávoly	Tschawerl	Bács-Kiskun	
Cselleimajor	Csellejhof	Győr-Moson-Sopron	
Csepel	Tschepele	Budapest	
Csörötnek	Schriedling	Vas	
Debrecen	Debrezin	Hajdú-Bihar	
Dorog	Drostdorf	Komárom-Esztergom	
Dunaharaszti	Harast	Pest	
Dunakiliti	Frauendorf	Győr-Moson-Sopron	
Dunaremete	Rematten	Győr-Moson-Sopron	
Ebergőc	Börgotz	Győr-Moson-Sopron	
Ecseny	Etsching	Somogy	
Eger	Erlau	Heves	
Egyházaskózar	Kosart	Baranya	
Erdőmecske	Ratzmetschke	Baranya	
Erszebétváros	Elisabethstadt	Budapest	
Esztergom	Gran	Komárom-Esztergom	
Esztergom	Österheim	Komárom-Esztergom	Archaic
Farkasgyepű	Wirtshäusl	Veszprém	
Farkasrét	Wolfswiese	Budapest	
Fazekasboda	Boden	Baranya	
Felsőszönök	Oberzemming	Vas	
Ferencváros	Franzstadt	Budapest	
Fertőboz	Holling	Győr-Moson-Sopron	
Fertőd	Schültern	Győr-Moson-Sopron	
Fertőendréd	Großandrä	Győr-Moson-Sopron	
Fertőhomok	Amhagen	Győr-Moson-Sopron	
Fertőrakós	Kroisbach	Győr-Moson-Sopron	
Fertőszentmiklós	St. Niklaus am Neusiedlersee	Győr-Moson-Sopron	
Gánt	Gant	Fejér	
Gazdagrét	Reiche Ried	Budapest	
Gellérthegy	Blocksberg	Budapest	
Geresdlak	Gereschlak	Baranya	
Gödöllő	Getterle	Pest	
Gödre	Gedri	Baranya	
Görcsönydoboka	Ketschinge-Tuwoke	Baranya	
Gyarmat	Jarmat	Győr-Moson-Sopron	
Gyód	Jood	Baranya	
Gyönk	Jink	Tolna	
Győr	Raab	Győr-Moson-Sopron	
Györköny	Jerking	Tolna	
Győrvár	Jorenburg	Vas	
Gyula	Julau	Békés	
Hajós	Hajosch	Bács-Kiskun	
Hanságfalva	Waasen	Győr-Moson-Sopron	
Harka	Harkau	Győr-Moson-Sopron	
Harta	Hartau	Bács-Kiskun	
Hásshágy	Haschad	Baranya	
Hegyeshalom	Straß-Sommerein	Győr-Moson-Sopron	
Hegykő	Heiligenstein	Győr-Moson-Sopron	
Hercegkút	Trautsondorf	Borsod-Abaúj-Zemplén	
Herminamezō	Herminenfeld	Budapest	
Hetvehely	Hetfehell	Baranya	
Hidas	Hidasch	Baranya	
Hidegség	Kleinandrä	Győr-Moson-Sopron	
Himesháza	Nimmersch	Baranya	
Hollókő	Rabenstein	Nógrád	
Horvátlövő	Kroatisch Schützen	Vas	
Hosszúhetény	Hetting	Baranya	
Hőgyész	Hidjeß	Tolna	
Irénmajor	Haidehof	Győr-Moson-Sopron	
Isztimér	Ißzimmer	Fejér	
Isztvánmező	Stephansfeld	Budapest	
Izmény	Ismi	Tolna	
Ják	St. Georgen	Vas	
Jakabháza	Jokashof	Vas	
Jánoshegy	Johannisberg	Budapest	
Jánossomorja	St. Johann	Győr-Moson-Sopron	
Józsefváros	Josephstadt	Budapest	
Kakasd	Kokesch	Tolna	
Kaposvár	Kopisch	Somogy	
Katymár	Katschmar	Bács-Kiskun	
Kelenföld	Kranfeld	Budapest	
Kimle	Kimling	Győr-Moson-Sopron	
Kisber	Beer	Komárom-Esztergom	
Kisbodak	Kleinbodacken	Győr-Moson-Sopron	
Kisdorog	Kleindorog	Tolna	
Kisjakabfalva	Jackfall	Baranya	
Kislőd	Kischlud	Veszprém	
Kispest	Klein-Pesth	Budapest	
Kistormás	Kleindarmisch	Tolna	
Kisújbánja	Neuglashütte	Baranya	
Kissvábhegy	Klein-Schwabenberg	Budapest	
Kisvárda	Kleinwardein	Szabolcs-Satmár-Bereg	
Kiszsidány	Roggendorf	Győr-Moson-Sopron	
Kőbánya	Steinbruch	Budapest	
Komárom	Komorn	Komárom-Esztergom	
Kondorfa	Krottendorf	Vas	
Környe	Kirnau	Komárom-Esztergom	
Kőszeg	Güns	Vas	
Kőszegdoroszló	Deisdorf	Vas	
Kőszefalva	Schwabendorf	Vas	Part of Kőszeg
Krisztinaváros	Christinenstadt	Budapest	
Kübekháza	Kübek	Csóngrád	
Kunbaja	Kumbai	Bács-Kiskun	
Kútvölgy	Brunntal	Budapest	
Lábatlan	Labeland	Komárom-Esztergom	
Lánycsók	Lantschuk	Baranya	
Lébény	Leiden	Győr-Moson-Sopron	
Levél	Kaltenstein	Győr-Moson-Sopron	
Lipót	Lipold	Győr-Moson-Sopron	
Lipótváros	Leopoldstadt	Budapest	
Lippó	Lippwar	Baranya	
Liptód	Litowr	Baranya	
Lövő	Schützen	Győr-Moson-Sopron	
Madárhegy	Vogelberg	Budapest	
Mágocs	Magotsch	Baranya	
Magyarbóly	Ungarischbohl	Baranya	
Magyarlak	Ungarisch Minihof	Vas	
Majos	Maiesch	Tolna	
Majs	Maisch	Baranya	
Makkosmária	Maria-Eichel	Budapest	
Maráza	Marase	Baranya	
Máriaholm	Kirwa	Komárom-Esztergom	
Máriakálnok	Gahling	Győr-Moson-Sopron	
Máriapócz	Maria Potsch	Szabolcs-Satmár-Berg	
Márok	Deutschmarok	Baranya	
Mártonhegy	Martiniberg	Budapest	
Máza	Mase	Tolna	
Mecsekjánosi	Janoschi	Baranya	Part of Komló
Mecseknádasd	Nadasch	Baranya	
Menfőcsanak	Tschanak	Győr-Moson-Sopron	
Miklósi	Niklasing	Somogy	
Mohács	Mohatsch	Baranya	
Mór	Moor	Fejér	
Mórágy	Maratz	Tolna	
Musci	Mutsching	Tolna	
Moson	Wieselburg	Győr-Moson-Sopron	
Mosondarnó	Dornach	Győr-Moson-Sopron	
Mosonmagyaróvár	Wieselburg-Ungarisch Altenburg	Győr-Moson-Sopron	
Mosonszentpéter	St. Peter	Győr-Moson-Sopron	Part of Jánossomorja
Mosonszolnok	Zanegg	Győr-Moson-Sopron	
Nagybörzsöny	Deutschpilsen	Pest	
Nagybudmér	Großbudmer	Baranya	
Nagycenk	Zinkendorf	Győr-Moson-Sopron	
Nagyczákány	Großzackersdorf	Vas	
Nagygencs	Gentschdorf	Vas	
Nagyhajmás	Heimasch	Baranya	
Nagykanizsa	Groß Kanischa	Zala	
Nagykölked	Großkulken	Vas	
Nagylósz	Losing	Győr-Moson-Sopron	
Nagymányok	Großmanok	Tolna	
Nagynyárád	Großnarad	Baranya	
Nágytétény	Groß-Teting	Budapest	
Nagytevel	Deutschtewel	Veszprém	
Nemescsó	Tschobing	Vas	
Nemesládony	Ober Larnhof	Győr-Moson-Sopron	
Nemeskér	Altedlein	Győr-Moson-Sopron	
Nemesmedvesz	Ginisdorf	Vas	
Nemesnádudvar	Nadwar	Bács-Kiskun	
Németkér	Kier	Tolna	
Németvölgy	Deutschental	Budapest	
Nyergesújfalu	Neudorf an der Donau	Komárom-Esztergom	
Óbuda	Alt-Ofen	Budapest	
Ófalu	Ofalo	Baranya	
Olasz	Ahlaß	Baranya	
Ölbő	Elbling	Vas	
Őrmező	Landstrasse	Budapest	
Oroszlány	Ohreslahn	Komárom-Esztergom	
Országút	Feldhut	Budapest	
Palkonya	Palkan	Baranya	
Palotabozsok	Boschok	Baranya	
Pannonhalma	Martinsberg	Győr-Moson-Sopron	
Pápoc	Papandorf	Vas	
Pári	Pari	Tolna	
Pécs	Fünfkirchen	Baranya	
Pécsvárad	Petschwar	Baranya	
Permise	Permisch	Vas	
Pest	Pesth	Budapest	
Pesthidegkút	Hidikut	Budapest	
Petőháza	Pöttelshausen	Győr-Moson-Sopron	
Pilisborosjenő	Weindorf	Pest	
Pilisszentiván	Sankt Iwan bei Ofen	Pest	
Pilisvörösvár	Werischwar	Pest	
Pinkamindszent	Allerheiligen	Vas	
Pinnye	Pinier	Győr-Moson-Sopron	
Pinnyéd	Fischerdörfl	Győr-Moson-Sopron	
Pórládony	Unter Larnhof	Győr-Moson-Sopron	
Pornóapáti	Pernau	Vas	
Porpác	Bernbach	Vas	
Püski	Püschki	Győr-Moson-Sopron	
Pusztavám	Pußtawam	Fejér	
Rábadoroszló	Frauendorf	Vas	
Rábafüzes	Raabfidisch	Vas	
Rábagyarmat	Rupprecht	Vas	
Rábakecöl	Kätzelsdorf	Győr-Moson-Sopron	
Rábatótfalu	Windischdorf	Vas	
Rajka	Ragendorf	Győr-Moson-Sopron	
Rákoskereszúr	Kresstur	Budapest	
Rákospalota	Palota	Budapest	
Rátka	Ratkau	Borsod-Abaúj-Zemplén	
Rátót	Neustift	Vas	
Roherföld	Rohrerfeld	Győr-Moson-Sopron	
Röjtök	Ridesch	Győr-Moson-Sopron	
Rönök	Radling	Vas	
Rózsadomb	Rosenhügel	Budapest	
Sarród	Schrollen	Győr-Moson-Sopron	
Sárvár	Rotenturm an der Raab	Vas	
Sasad	Burgerberg	Budapest	
Solymár	Schaumar	Pest	
Somberek	Schomberg	Baranya	
Sopron	Ödenburg	Győr-Moson-Sopron	
Sopronbánfalva	Wandorf	Győr-Moson-Sopron	Part of Sopron
Sopronkövesd	Giessing	Győr-Moson-Sopron	
Soroksár	Schorokschar	Budapest	
Sümeg	Schimeck	Veszprém	
Svábhegy	Schwabenberg	Budapest	
Szajk	Seik	Baranya	
Szakadát	Sagetal	Tolna	
Szakonyfalu	Eckersdorf	Vas	
Szalafő	Salafeld	Vas	
Szalatnak	Salack	Baranya	
Szálka	Salka	Tolna	
Szár	Saar	Fejér	
Szederkény	Surgetin	Baranya	
Szeged	Segedin	Csongrád	
Szekélyszabar	Sawer	Baranya	
Székesfehérvár	Stuhlweißenburg	Fejér	
Szendehely	Sende	Nógrád	
Szentendre	Sankt Andra	Pest	
Szentendre	Sankt Andrä	Pest	
Szentgotthárd	Sankt Gotthard	Vas	
Szentgyörgymező	Georgenfeld	Komárom-Esztergom	Part of Esztergom
Szentpéterfa	Prostrum	Vas	
Szigetbetsche	Wetsch	Pest	
Szigetcsép	Tschep	Pest	
Szigetszentmárton	Sankt Martin	Pest	
Szigetújfalu	Inselneudorf	Pest	
Szigetújfalu	Ujfluch	Pest	
Szombathely	Steinamanger	Vas	
Szulok	Sulk	Somogy	
Szűr	Sier	Baranya	
Tabán	Raitzenstadt	Budapest	
Taksony	Taks	Pest	
Tarján	Tarian	Komárom-Esztergom	
Tát	Taath	Komárom-Esztergom	
Tata	Totis	Komárom-Esztergom	
Tatabánya	Totiserkolonie	Komárom-Esztergom	
Tapolca	Toppoltz	Veszprém	
Taródfa	Dudelsdorf	Vas	
Terézváros	Theresienstadt	Budapest	
Tevel	Tewel	Tolna	
Tokod	Erbstolln	Komárom-Esztergom	
Tököl	Tekele	Pest	
Tolna	Tolnau	Tolna	
Törökbálint	Groß Turwall	Pest	
Torony	Dienling	Vas	
Tósokberénd	Duschigwehrend	Veszprém	
Töttös	Tiedisch	Baranya	
Újkér	Neuedlein	Győr-Moson-Sopron	
Újlak	Neustift	Budapest	
Újpest	Neu-Pesth	Budapest	
Újpetre	Ratzpeter	Baranya	
Újrónafő	Kaiserwiese	Győr-Moson-Sopron	
Vác	Waitzen	Pest	
Vállaj	Wallei	Szabolcs-Szatmár-Bereg	
Vár	Festung	Budapest	
Várbalog	Jessyhof	Győr-Moson-Sopron	
Várdomb	Wardum	Tolna	
Városlőd	Waschlud	Veszprém	
Varsád	Waschad	Tolna	
Vaskeresztes	Großdorf	Vas	
Vassurány	Schrambach	Vas	
Vasvár	Eisenburg	Vas	
Velem	Sankt Veit	Vas	
Véménd	Wemend	Baranya	
Vép	Wettendorf	Vas	
Vértesacsa	Atschau	Fejér	
Vértestolna	Tolnau	Komárom-Esztergom	
Versend	Werschend	Baranya	
Veszprém	Weissbrunn	Veszprém	
Veszprém	Wesprim	Veszprém	
Vica	Witzau	Győr-Moson-Sopron	
Villány	Wieland	Baranya	
Villánykövesd	Gowisch	Baranya	
Visegrád	Plintenburg	Pest	
Vitnyéd	Letting	Győr-Moson-Sopron	
Víziváros	Wasserstadt	Budapest	
Víziváros	Wasserstadt	Komárom-Esztergom	Part of Esztergom
Zalavár	Mosaburg	Zala	
Zsámbék	Schambeck	Pest	
Zseli	Schöllern	Győr-Moson-Sopron	
Zsira	Tening	Győr-Moson-Sopron	
Zugliget	Sauwinkel	Budapest	

== See also ==
- German exonyms
- List of European exonyms
