= Surré =

Coordinates: 49°54′N 5°47′E

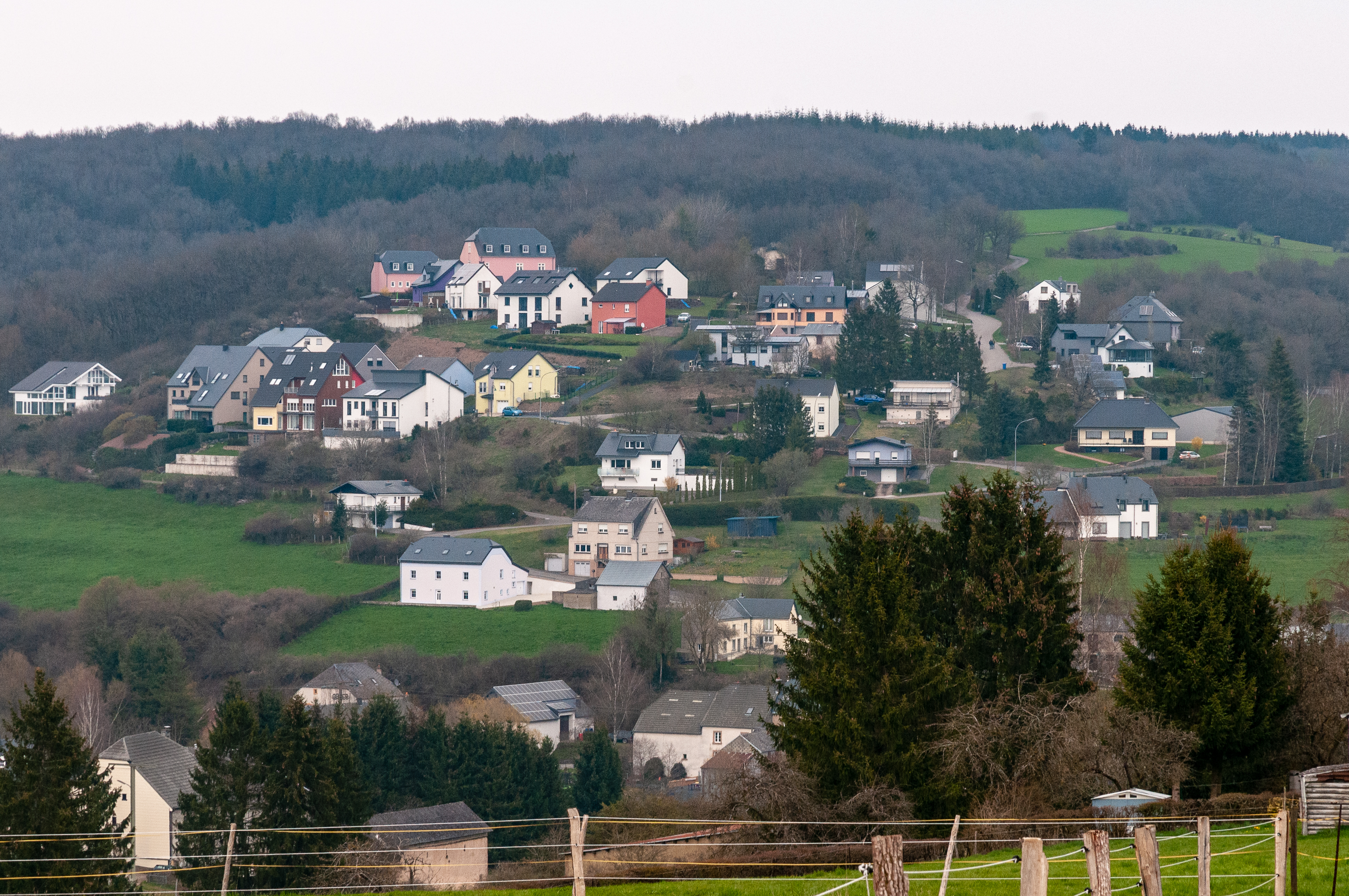
View of Surré from the Rue des Carrières.

Surré (French pronunciation: [syʁe]; Luxembourgish: Sir; German: Syr) is a village in the commune of Boulaide, in north-western Luxembourg. As of September 2026, the village has a population of 257.
