= Meysembourg Castle =

Coordinates: 49°46′13″N 06°11′14″E

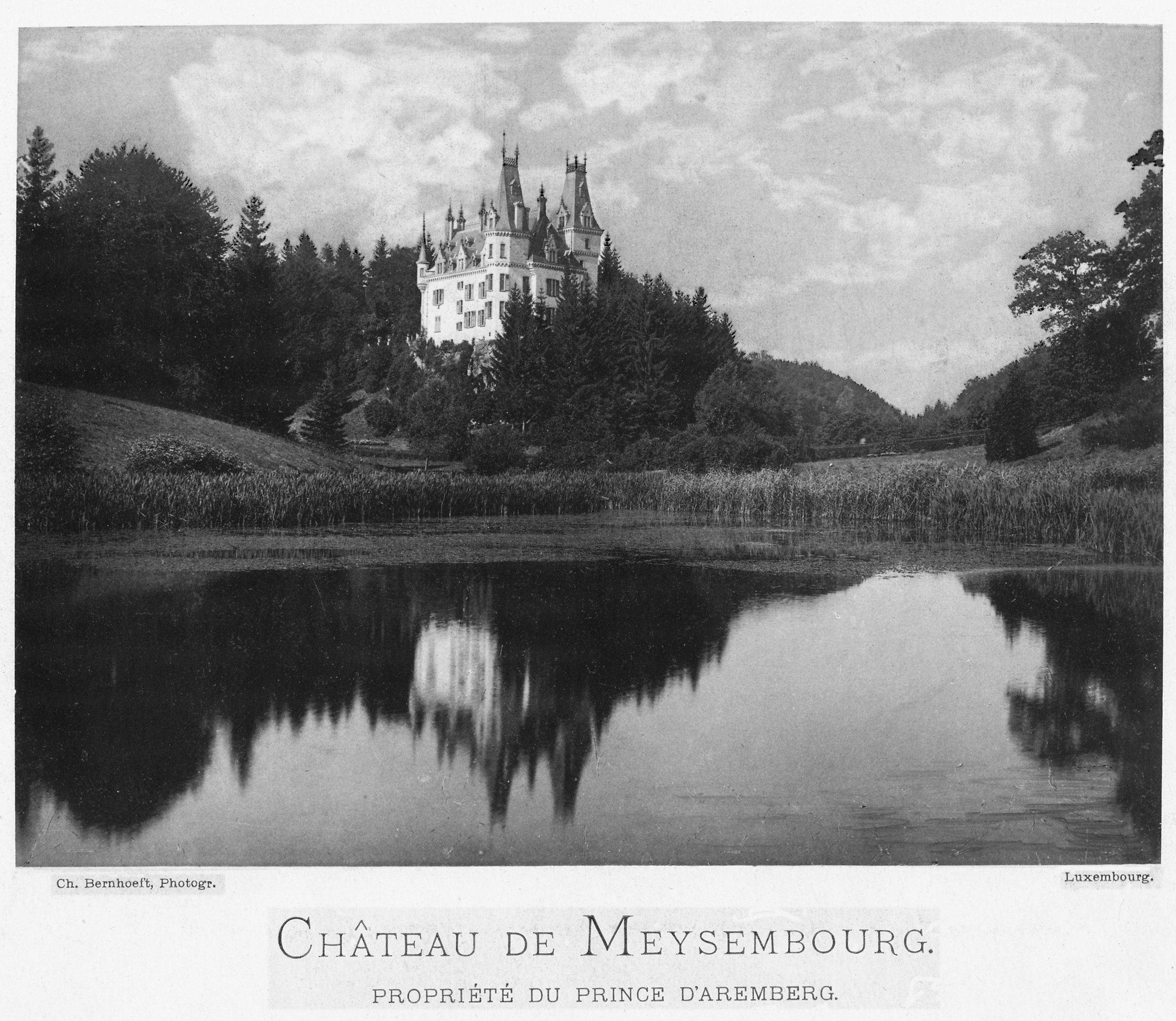
Charles Bernhoeft: Historic photograph of Meysembourg Castle (1891)

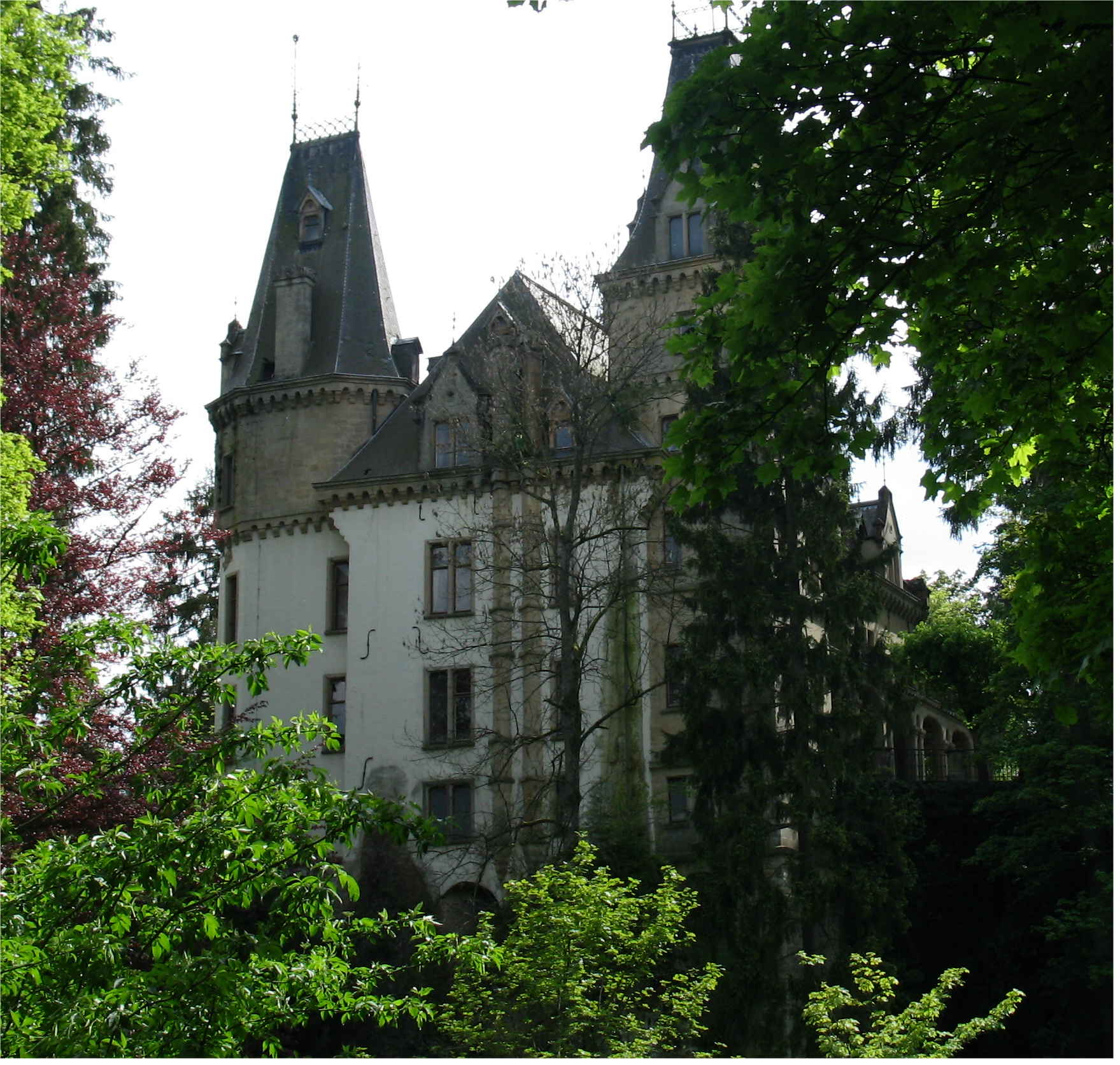
Meysembourg Castle in 2005

Meysembourg Castle (Luxembourgish: Schlass Meesebuerg; French: Château de Meysembourg) is located some 2 km south-west of Larochette in central Luxembourg. While the site has a history dating back to the 12th century, today's castle was built in 1880 in Neo-Renaissance style and is privately owned.

== History ==
The Meysembourg family is first mentioned in the 12th century when Dame de Meysembourg was in the service of Ermesinde, Countess of Luxembourg. Historic references show that Walter de Meysembourg was the proprietor in 1176 and Eberhart de Maysembourg in 1296. In 1443, the castle was destroyed by Philip the Good but was rebuilt before 1500. It was again destroyed by Maréchal de Boufflers troops in 1683–84. All that remains of the former castle are the chapel, the moat and part of the outer wall. Custine de Wiltz, the last in line to inherit the property, fled during the French invasion in 1794. Following a public auction in 1798, the castle fell into the hands of the Lords of Fischbach, Cassal and finally Jean-François Reuter of Heddersdorf who occupied the village after expelling its inhabitants.

After buying the property in 1855, the Prince of Arenberg demolished it in 1880 and built a new castle in Neo-Renaissance style. In 1971, the State architect Charles Arendt carried out restoration work. In 1974 the property was sold to Alphonse Spiegelburg. After his death, important restoration work was carried out from 2014 to 2016, funded by the State. The castle and surrounding area is now in the property of the Clasen family.

== The castle today ==
The castle is privately owned and is not open to visitors. However, the possibility exists, that the castle will be turned into a hotel.

== See also ==
- List of castles in Luxembourg
