= Ciolacu Nou =

- Commune
- Location within Moldova
- Coordinates: 47.4866666667°N 27.8255555556°E
- Country: Moldova
- District: Fălești District

Population (2014)
  - Total: 2,958
- Time zone: UTC+2 (EET)
  - Summer (DST): UTC+3 (EEST)

Ciolacu Nou is a commune in Fălești District, Moldova. It is composed of five villages: Ciolacu Nou, Ciolacu Vechi, Făgădău, Pocrovca and Șoltoaia.
