= Wallendorf-Pont =

Coordinates: 49.8741°N 6.2905°E

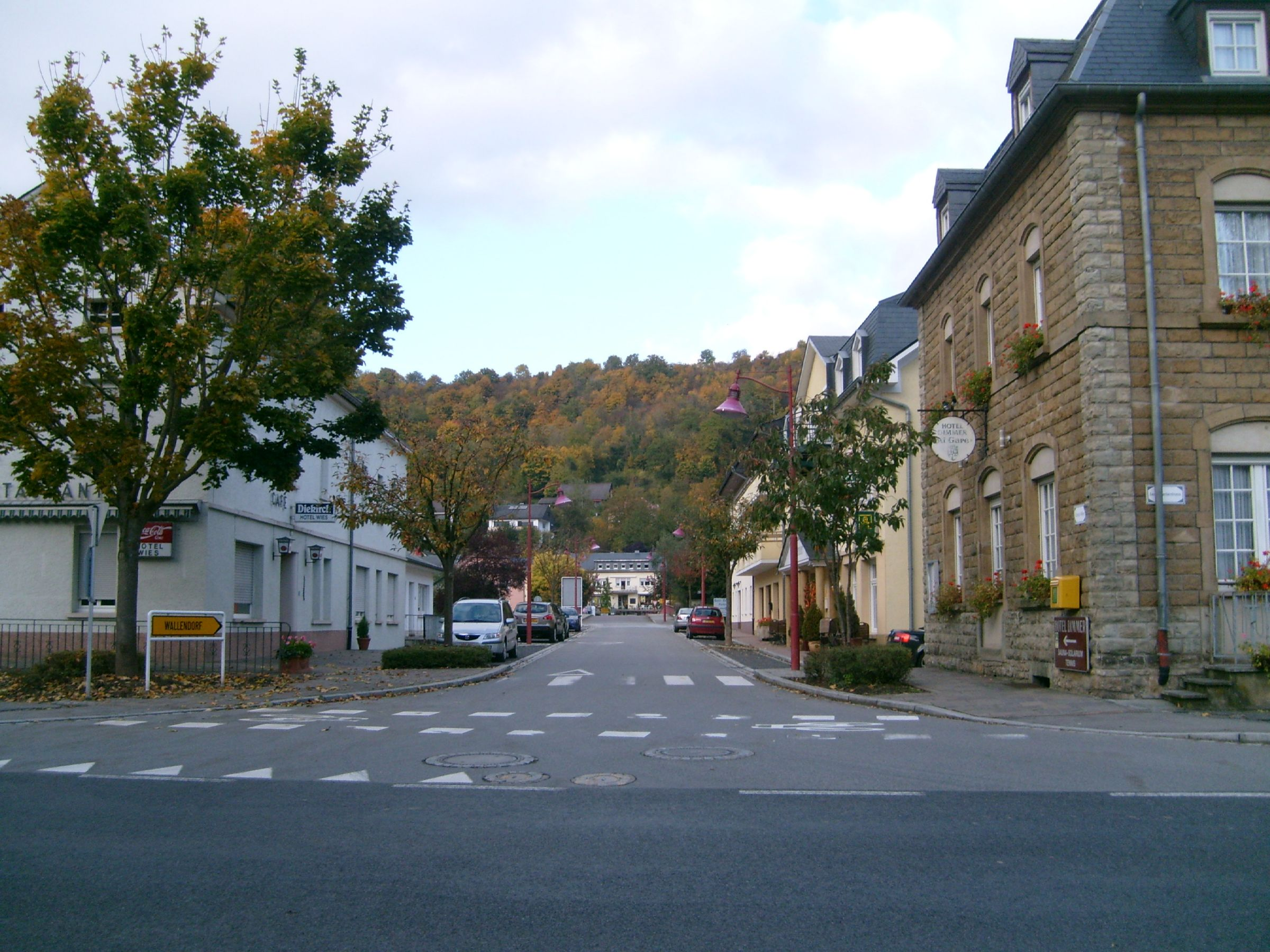

Wallendorf-Pont (Luxembourgish: Wallenduerfer-Bréck, German: Wallendorferbrück) is a village in the commune of Reisdorf, in eastern Luxembourg. As of September 2026, the town has a population of 254.

It is located on the Sauer river, on the border with Germany. It is connected to the German town of Wallendorf by a bridge.
