= Berlé =

Village in north-western Luxembourg

Coordinates: 49°57′N 5°51′E

Berlé (French pronunciation: [bɛʁle]; Luxembourgish: Bärel) is a village in the commune of Winseler, in north-western Luxembourg. As of September 2026, it had a population of 126.

During World War II in late January 1945, the village was destroyed by the American army's 203rd Field Artillery Group, specifically the 578 Field Artillery Battalion.

== Climate ==
Climate data for Berle
Month	Jan	Feb	Mar	Apr	May	Jun	Jul	Aug	Sep	Oct	Nov	Dec	Year
Mean daily maximum °C (°F)	2 (35)	3 (38)	8 (46)	12 (53)	16 (61)	19 (66)	21 (69)	19 (67)	17 (63)	12 (54)	6 (43)	3 (38)	12 (53)
Mean daily minimum °C (°F)	−3 (27)	−2 (28)	0 (32)	3 (37)	7 (44)	10 (50)	12 (53)	11 (52)	9 (48)	5 (41)	2 (35)	−1 (31)	4 (40)
Average precipitation mm (inches)	74 (2.9)	76 (3)	51 (2)	53 (2.1)	71 (2.8)	74 (2.9)	89 (3.5)	97 (3.8)	71 (2.8)	61 (2.4)	79 (3.1)	91 (3.6)	890 (34.9)
Source: Weatherbase
