= Bollendorf-Pont =

Coordinates: 49.8496°N 6.3581°E

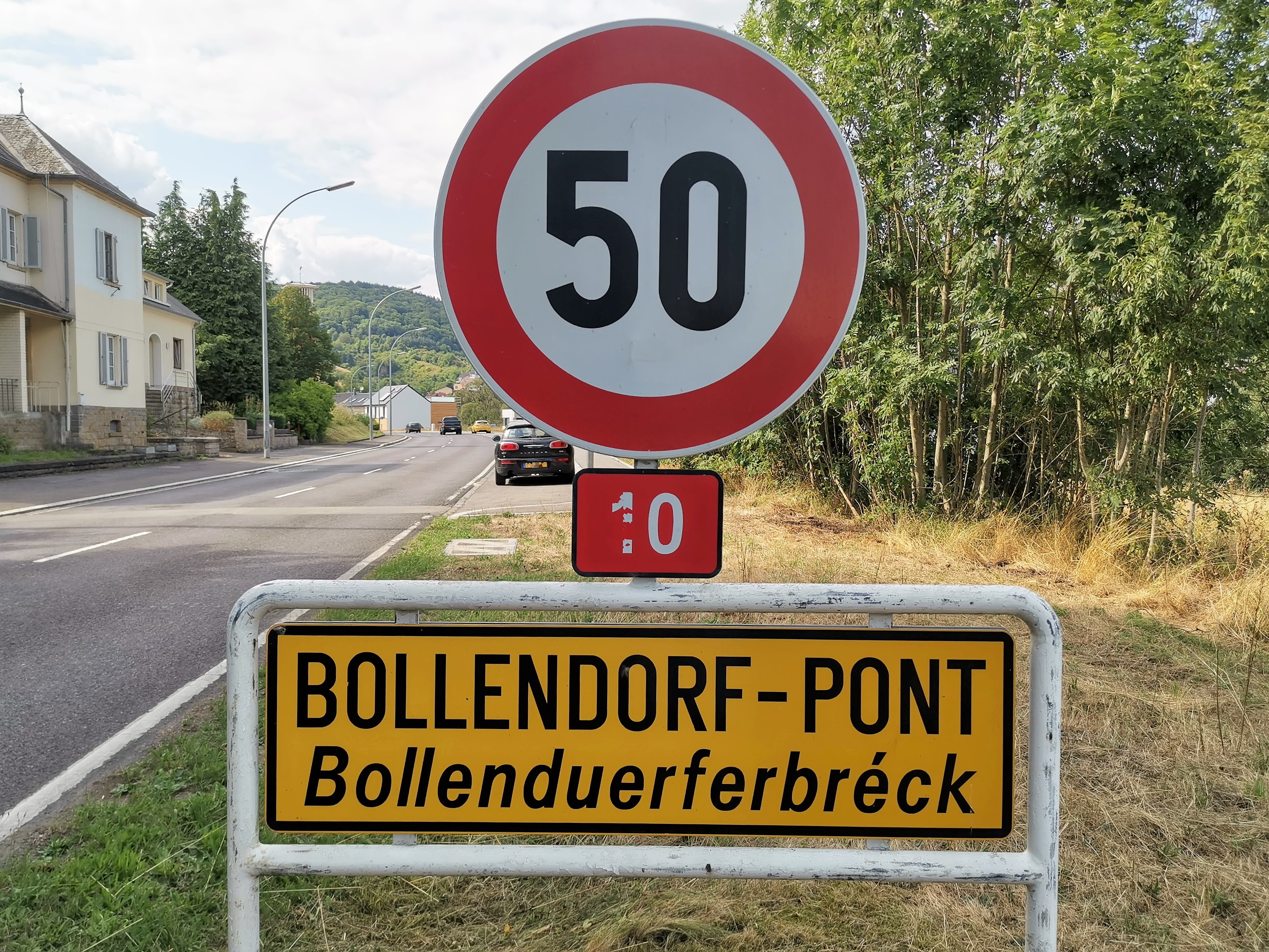
Entrance to Bollendorf-Pont

Bollendorf-Pont (Luxembourgish: Bollenduerferbréck, German: Bollendorferbrück) is a village in the commune of Berdorf, in eastern Luxembourg. As of September 2026, the village had a population of 359. It lies opposite the German town of Bollendorf.
