= List of names of European cities in different languages =

Many cities in Europe have different names in different languages. Some cities have also undergone name changes for political or other reasons. Below are listed the known different names for cities that are geographically or historically and culturally in Europe, as well as some smaller towns that are important because of their location or history.

Cities are listed alphabetically by their current best-known name in English. The English version is followed by variants in other languages, in alphabetical order by name, and then by any historical variants and former names. Several cities have diacritics in their listed name in English. It is very common that the press strip the diacritics and that means a parallel diacritic-free version is very often used in English. Foreign names that are the same as their English equivalents may be listed.

== See also ==
=== Exonyms by language ===
- Albanian exonyms
- Bulgarian exonyms
- Croatian exonyms
  - Italian exonyms in Dalmatia
  - Italian exonyms in Istria
- Czech exonyms
- Danish exonyms
- Dutch exonyms
- English exonyms
- Finnish exonyms
- German
  - German exonyms
  - Australian place names changed from German names
  - German names for Central European towns
  - German placename etymology
  - List of English exonyms for German toponyms
  - List of German exonyms for places in Belgium
  - List of German exonyms for places in the Czech Republic
  - List of German exonyms for places in Croatia
  - List of German exonyms for places in Poland
  - List of German exonyms for places in Switzerland
  - List of German exonyms for places in Transylvania
- Hungarian exonyms
- Icelandic exonyms
- Irish exonyms
- Names of Lithuanian places in other languages
- Lithuanian exonyms
  - Names of Belarusian places in other languages
- Norwegian exonyms
  - Names of Belarusian places in other languages
  - Names of Lithuanian places in other languages
- Portuguese exonyms
  - Names of Belarusian places in other languages
  - Names of Lithuanian places in other languages
- Slavic toponyms for Greek places
- Slovak exonyms
- Slovenian exonyms
- Spanish exonyms
- Vietnamese exonyms
- Welsh exonyms

=== Other ===
- Endonym and exonym
- Toponymy
- Lists of places
- Lists of etymologies
- List of countries and capitals in native languages
- List of alternative country names
- List of country names in various languages
- List of European exonyms
- List of Latin place names in Europe
- List of European regions with alternative names
- List of European rivers with alternative names
- Place names in Irish
- List of traditional Greek place names
- List of names of Asian cities in different languages
- List of cities in Europe
- List of metropolitan areas in Europe by population
- List of villages in Europe by country
- Names of Belarusian places in other languages
- Names of Lithuanian places in other languages
- Names of places in Finland in Finnish and in Swedish

== Sources ==
- For Albanian names:
  - Albecorp, Atlas Gjeografik I Botës (1997)
- For Bulgarian names:
  - Атлас География (1998)
- For Croatian names:
  - Znanje, Školski Atlas, ISBN 953-195-142-X (2000)
- For Czech names:
  - Ikar, Školní Atlas, ISBN 80-7202-454-X (1999)
- For Danish names:
  - Politikens Verdens Atlas, ISBN 87-567-5690-9 (1998)
  - Alinea, Folke Skolens Atlas, ISBN 87-23-01813-5 (2005)
- For Dutch names:
  - Atrium Wereld Atlas, ISBN 90-6113-997-X (2002)
- For Estonian names:
  - Otava, Atlas, ISBN 951-1-13888-X (1997)
- For Finnish names:
  - Uusi Iso Atlas, ISBN 951-20-4030-1 (1998)
- For French names:
  - LaRousse, Atlas Général (1976)
  - Magellan, Atlas Pratique, ISBN 2-237-00236-3 (1997)
- For German names:
  - Westermann, Diercke Weltatlas, ISBN 3-14-100600-8 (2000)
  - Westermann, Durchblick Universalatlas, ISBN 3-14-100229-0 (2005)
- For Greek names:
  - Παγκόσμιος Άτλαντας, ISBN 960-7372-34-4 (1995)
  - Γεωγραφικός Άτλαντας, ISBN 960-8061-02-4 (1999)
- For Hungarian names:
  - A Föld Világatlasz, ISBN 963-9251-00-3 (1999)
- For Irish names:
  - Collins-Longman, Atlas a haon do scoileanna na hÉireann (1977)
- For Italian names:
  - Garzanti, Atlante Geografico e Storico, ISBN 88-11-50425-2 (1994)
- For Latvian names:
  - Pasaules Ģeogrāfijas Atlants, ISBN 9984-07-090-5 (1997)
- For Macedonian names:
  - Mojot Атлас (1991)
- For Maltese names:
  - Lizio Zerafa, Agħraf Pajjiżek, Il-Ġografija (1992)
- For Norwegian names:
  - Kunnskapsforlaget, Store Verdensatlas, ISBN 82-573-0826-9 (1997)
- For Polish names:
  - PPWK, Świat Atlas Geograficzny, ISBN 83-7000-341-9 (1997)
- For Portuguese names:
  - Celso Antunes, Atlas Geográfico, ISBN 85-262-3143-X (1999)
  - Bernard Jenner, Atlas Geográfico Ilustrado, ISBN 85-262-2148-5 (1999)
  - Edelbra, Atlas Universal, ISBN 85-7390-032-6 (2001)
- For Romanian names:
  - Octavian Mândruţ, Atlas Geografic Şcolar, ISBN 973-653-009-4 (1999)
  - Garamond, Atlas Geografic Didactic, ISBN 973-9140-67-X (1998)
  - LaRousse, Atlasul Statelor Lumii, ISBN 973-98762-1-8 (1999)
  - E. Gregorian et al., Atlas Geografic Şcolar, ISBN 973-30-3676-5 (1998)
- For Russian names:
  - Атлас Мира, ISBN 5-249-00385-0 (2000)
- For Serbian names:
  - Географски Атлас (1997)
- For Slovak names:
  - Ikar, Školský Atlas, ISBN 80-7118-769-0 (1999)
- For Slovene names:
  - Založba Mladinska knjiga, Atlas Sveta 2000, ISBN 86-11-15631-5 (1998)
- For Spanish names:
  - Atlas Mundial, ISBN 968-7668-58-X (1997)
  - Bill Boyle, Mi primer Atlas, ISBN 968-39-1227-3 (1994)
  - Altas Escolar Universal Porrúa, ISBN 968-452-319-X (1988)
- For Swedish names:
  - Almqvist & Wiksell, Atlas, ISBN 91-21-16524-6 (1998)
  - Almqvist & Wiksell, Atlas, ISBN 91-21-17789-9 (1999)
- For Turkish names:
  - Arkın Kitabevi, İlköğretim Atlası, ISBN 975-402-029-9 (1999)
  - F.S. Duran, Büyük Atlas, ISBN 975-7537-04-7 (2000)
- For Ukrainian names:
  - Атлас Світу (1999)
- For Welsh names:
  - Collins-Longman, Yr Atlas Cymraeg Newydd, ISBN 1-86085-377-3 (1999)
