= Slovene exonyms =

Below is a list of Slovene exonyms and endonyms for places outside of Slovenia, as shown in a list published by the Geodetic Administration of the Republic of Slovenia, an agency of the government of Slovenia and in other works.

== Albania (Albanija) ==
- Durrës Drač
- Korçë Korča
- Shkodër Skader
- Tiranë Tirana

== Algeria (Alžirija) ==
- al-Jazāʾir (Algiers) Alžir

== Austria (Avstrija) ==
- Bad Radkersburg Radgona
- Bruck an der Mur Most na Muri
- Eisenstadt Železno
- Graz Gradec
- Innsbruck Inomost
- Leibnitz Lipnica
- Salzburg Solnograd
- Sankt Michael Sv. Mihael
- Seckau Sekava
- Wien Dunaj
- Wiener Neustadt Dunajsko Novo mesto

=== Carinthia (Koroška) ===
- Altfinkenstein (the suggested translation Stari Grad or "Old Town" may refer to a number of different locations)
- Arnoldstein Podklošter
- Bad Bleiberg Plajberk
- Bad Eisenkappel Železna Kapla
- Bad Vellach Bela
- Bleiburg Pliberk
- Buchbrunn Bukovje
- Buchhalm Podhom
- Buchheim Podhum
- Diex Djekše
- Dolintschach Dolinčiče
- Dragositschach Dragožiče
- Dreilach Dravlje
- Duell Dole
- Eberndorf Dobrla vas
- Edling Kazaze
- Eibiswald Ivnik
- Emmersdorf Tmara vas
- Faak am See Bače
- Feistritz Bistrica
  - Feistritz an der Drau Bistrica na Dravi
  - Feistritz ob Bleiburg Bistrica pri Pliberku
  - Feistritz an der Gail Bistrica na Zilji
  - Feistritz im Rosental Bistrica v Rožu
- Feldkirchen in Kärnten Trg
- Ferlach Borovlje
- Finkenstein am Faaker See Bekštanj
- Fresnach Brežnje
- Frießnitz Breznica
- Frög Breg
- Frojach Broje
- Fürnitz Brnca
- Gablern Lovanke
- Gerlitzen Osojščica
- Gödersdorf Vodiča vas
- Gorintschach Gorinčiče
- Goritschach Zagoriče
- Gösselsdorf Goselna vas
- Greuth Rute
- Gurk Krka
- Hart Dobrova
- Höfling Dvorec
- Hohenthurn Straja vas
- Homitzberg Homec
- Humtschach Homče
- Kanin Hodnina
- Karnburg Krnski Grad
- Kerschdorf im Gailtal Črešnje
- Klagenfurt Celovec
- Kleinberg Mala gora
- Köcking Kokje
- Kohldorf Voglje
- Kopein Kopanje
- Korpitsch Grpiče
- Kühnsdorf Sinča vas
- Längdorf Velika vas
- Latschach Loče
- Lavamünd Labot
- Ledenitzen Ledince
- Leibnitz Lipnica
- Lessach Leše
- Loibegg Belovče
- Ludmannsdorf Bilčovs
- Mallenitzen Malence
- Maria Elend Podgorje
- Maria Gail Marija na Zilji
- Maria Saal Gospa Sveta
- Maria Wörth Otok
- Millstatt am See Milje, Milštat
- Mittlern Metlova
- Mökriach Mokrije
- Mühlbach Reka
- Müllnern Mlinare
- Nötsch im Gailtal Čajna
- Oberaichwald Zgornje Dobje
- Oberburg Zgornij Podgrad
- Oberferlach Zgornje Borovlje
- Obergoritschach Zgornje Goriče
- Ossiach Osoje
- Outschena Ovčna
- Petschnitzen Pečnica
- Pirk Brezje
- Pogöriach Pogorje
- Pörtschach Poreče
- Pribelsdorf Priblja vas
- Ratnitz Ratenče
- Raun Ravne
- Rosegg Rožek
- Rosenbach Podrožca
- Saak Čače
- Sand (Wernberg) Pešče
- Sankt Jakob Šentjakob
- Sankt Job Šentjob
- Sankt Johann (Rosegg) Ščedem
- Sankt Lamprecht Semislavče
- Sankt Martin (Rosegg) Šmartin
- Sankt Marxen Šmarkež
- Sankt Oswald Šentožbolt
- Sankt Paul im Lavatal Šentpal
- Sankt Peter Šentpeter
- Sankt Veit am Glan Šent Vid na Glini
- Schlatten Svatne
- Seebach Jezernica
- Sigmontitsch Zmotiče
- Srajach Sreje
- Stobitzen Stopca
- Susalitsch Žužalče
- Tainach Tinje
- Tallach Tale
- Techanting Teharče
- Tösching Tešinja
- Trabenig Trabenče
- Treffen Trebinje
- Umberg Umbar
- Unteraichwald Spodnje Dobje
- Unterbergen Podgora
- Unterferlach Spodnje Borovlje
- Untergoritschach Spodnje Goriče
- Untergreuth Spodnje Rute
- Unterloibl Podljubelj
- Velden Vrba
- Villach Beljak
- Völkermarkt Velikovec
- Wasserhofen Žirovnica
- Wernberg Vernberk
- Winkl Kot
- Wolfsberg Volšperk

== Belgium (Belgija) ==
- Brussel-Bruxelles Bruselj

== Croatia (Hrvaška) ==
- Karlovac Karlovec
- Osijek Osek (obsolete)
- Pula Pulj
- Rijeka Reka
- Sisak Sisek

== Cyprus (Ciper) ==
- Lefkosia Nikozija

== Czech Republic (Češka) ==
- Praha Praga

== Denmark (Danska) ==
- København København

== France (Francija) ==
- Nice Nica
- Paris Pariz

== Germany (Nemčija) ==
- Aachen Cahe (obsolete)
- Bautzen Budišin
- Chemnitz Kamenice (obsolete)
- Köln Kelmorajn (obsolete)
- Dresden Draždane (obsolete)
- Freising Brižinje
- München Monakovo (obsolete)
- Regensburg Rezno (obsolete)

== Greece (Grčija) ==
- Athina Atene
- Kerkyra Krf
- Korinthos Korint
- Kriti Kreta
- Peiraias Pirej
- Rhodhos Rodos
- Thessaloniki Solun

== Hungary (Madžarska) ==
- Alsószölnök Dolnji Senik
- Budapest Budimpešta
- Felsőszölnök Gornji Senik
- Pécs Pečuh
- Székesfehérvár Stolni Belgrad (obsolete)
- Szentgotthárd Monošter
- Szombathely Sombotel

== Italy (Italija) ==
- Ancona Jakin (obsolete)
- Bolzano Bocen
- Firenze Firence
- Milano Milano
- Brixen Briksen
- Napoli Neapelj
- Pisa Pisa
- Roma Rim
- Siracusa Sirakuze
- Torino Torino
- Venezia Benetke

=== Friuli Venezia Giulia (Furlanija-Julijska krajina) ===
- Aquileia Oglej
- Attimis Ahten
- Chiusaforte Kluže
- Cividale del Friuli Čedad
- Cormons Krmín
- Corno di Rosazzo Rožac
- Doberdò del Lago Doberdob
- Dogna Dunja
- Drenchia Dreka
- Duino Devin
- Aurisina Nabrežina
- Aurisina S. Croce Nabrežina Križ
- Cervignano Červinjan
- Dolegna del Collio Dolenje
- Faedis Fojda
- Fogliano Redipuglia Fojana Rodopolje
- Gemona del Friuli Humin
- Gorizia Gorica
- Grado Gradež
- Gradisca Gradišče
- Grimacco Grmek
- Lusevera Brdo
- Monfalcone Tržič
- Malborghetto Valbruna Naborjet - Ovčja vas
- Moggio Udinese Mužac
- Monrupino Repentabor
- Montenars Gorjani
- Muggia Milje
- Nimis Neme
- Pontebba Tablja
- Prepotto Praprotno
- Pulfero Podbonesec
- Resia Rezija
- Resiutta Na Bili
- Ronchi dei Legionari Ronke
- Sagrado Zagraj
- San Dorligo della Valle Dolina
- San Floriano del Collio Števerjan
- San Giovanni di Duino Štivan
- San Leonardo Podutana
- San Pelagio Šempolaj
- San Pietro al Natisone Špeter Slovenov
- Santa Croce di Trieste Križ
- Savogna (UD) Sovodnje
- Savogna d'Isonzo (GO) Sovodnje ob Soči
- Sgonico Zgonik
- Sistiana Sesljan
- Staranzano Štarancan
- Taipana Tipana
- Tarcento Čenta
- Tarvisio Trbiž
- Torreano Tavorjana
- Turriaco Turjak
- Trieste Trst
- Udine Videm
- Venzone Pušja vas
- Villa Opicina Opčine

== Lithuania (Litva) ==
- Kaunas Kovno (obsolete)
- Vilnius Vilna

== Luxembourg (Luksemburg) ==
- Luxembourg Luksemburg

== Moldova (Moldavija) ==
- Chişinău Kišinjev

== Poland (Poljska) ==
- Bydgoszcz Bidgošč
- Bytom Bitom
- Częstochowa Čenstohova
- Gliwice Glivice
- Katowice Katovice
- Kraków Krakov
- Łódź Lodž
- Poznań Poznanj
- Szczecin Štetin
- Warsaw Varšava
- Wrocław Vroclav

== Portugal (Portugalska) ==
- Lisboa Lizbona

== Romania (Romunija) ==
- București Bukarešta
- Constanța Konstanca
- Oradea Veliki Varadin (obsolete)
- Timișoara Temišvar

== Serbia (Srbija) ==
- Beograd Belgrad (obsolete)

== Spain (Španija) ==
- Córdoba Kordova (obsolete)
- Ibiza Ibica (obsolete)
- Mallorca Malorka (obsolete)
- Menorca Menorka (obsolete)
- Salamanca Salamanka (Obsolete)
- Sevilla Sevilja
- Valencia Valencija
- Zaragoza Saragosa

== Switzerland (Švica) ==
- Genève Ženeva
- Lausanne Lozana
- Luzern Lucern

== Turkey (Turčija) ==
- Alanya Alanija
- Antalya Antalija
- Edirne Odrin
- İstanbul Carigrad
- İzmir Smirna
- Izmit Nikomédija

== Ukraine (Ukrajina) ==
- Kyiv Kijev
- Lviv Lvov
- Kharkiv Harkov

== United Kingdom (Združeno kraljestvo) ==
- England Anglija
- Great Britain Velika Britanija
- Northern Ireland Severna Irska
- Scotland Škotska

== United States of America (Združene države Amerike) ==
- Alaska Aljaska

== See also ==
- List of European exonyms
