= List of European exonyms =

Below is a list with links to further Wikipedia-pages containing lists of exonyms of various European languages for villages, towns, and cities in Europe.

- Albanian exonyms
- Croatian exonyms
- Czech exonyms
- Danish exonyms
- Dutch exonyms
- English exonyms
- Finnish exonyms
- German exonyms
  - German exonyms (Moselle)
- Hungarian exonyms
- Icelandic exonyms
- Irish exonyms
- Lithuanian exonyms
- Old Norse exonyms
- Norwegian exonyms
- Portuguese exonyms
- Rusyn exonyms (Vojvodina)
- Slovak exonyms
- Slovenian exonyms
- Spanish exonyms
- Welsh exonyms

== See also ==
- Latin exonyms
- List of English exonyms for German toponyms
- List of European regions with alternative names
- List of European rivers with alternative names
- List of Latin place names in Continental Europe
- List of traditional Greek place names
- Names of Belarusian places in other languages
- Names of European cities in different languages
- Names of Lithuanian places in other languages
