= Latin exonyms =

Exonyms for places outside of the core of the Roman empire

Below is list of Latin exonyms for places outside of the core of the Roman empire during the time Latin was in common use:

== Albania ==
Albania
English name	Latin name	Endonym	Notes
Durrës	Dyrrachium	Durrës	
Lezhë	Lissus	Lezhë	
Vlorë	Aulona	Vlorë	

== Austria ==
Austria
English name	Latin name	Endonym	Notes
Eisenstadt	Ferreum Castrum	Eisenstadt	
Graz	Græcia	Graz	
Innsbruck	Pons Æni	Innsbruck	
Linz	Lentia	Linz	
Salzburg	Salisburgum	Salzburg	
Sankt Pölten	Cetium	Sankt Pölten	
Vienna	Vindobona	Wien	

== Belgium ==
Belgium Belgia
English name	Latin name	Endonym		Notes
English name	Latin name	Name	Language	Notes
Ghent	Gandava			
Kortrijk	Cortoriacum			
Tongeren	Atuatuca Tungrorum			

== Bulgaria ==
Bulgaria
English name	Latin name	Endonym	Notes
Balchik	Dionysopolis		
Kyustendil	Pautalia		
Lom	Almus		
Lovech	Melta		
Pleven	Storgosia		
Plovdiv	Philippopolis		
Razgrad	Abrittus		
Ruse	Sexaginta Prista		
Silistra	Durostorum		
Sofia	Serdica		
Sozopol	Apollonia Pontica		
Stara Zagora	Augusta Traiana		
Svishtov	Novæ		
Varna	Odessus		
Vidin	Bononia		

== Czech Republic ==
Czech Republic Cechia
English name	Latin name	Endonym	Notes
Brno	Bruna	Brno	
Krnov	Carnovia	Krnov	
Prague	Praga	Praha	

== Denmark ==
Denmark Dania
English name	Latin name	Endonym	Notes
Copenhagen	Hafnia	København	

== Egypt ==
Egypt Ægyptus
English name	Latin name	Endonym		Notes
English name	Latin name	Name	Language	Notes
Akhmim	Panopolis			
Al-Arish	Rhinocolura			
Al-Ashumein	Hermopolis			
Aswan	Lycopolis			
Asyut	Syene			
Farama	Pelusium			
Luxor	Thebæ			
Marsa Matruh	Parætonium			
Qift	Coptus			

== France ==
France Francia
English name	Latin name	Endonym	Notes
Avignon	Avenio		
Lyon	Lugdunum		
Marseille	Massilia		
Nice	Nicæa		
Paris	Lutetia Parisiorum		
Strasbourg	Strasburgum		
Toulouse	Tolosa		

== Germany ==
Germany Germania
English name	Latin name	Endonym		Notes
English name	Latin name	Name	Language	Notes
Aachen	Aquisgrana			
Augsburg	Augusta Vindelicorum			
Baden-Baden	Aurelia Aquensis			
Berlin	Berolinum			
Bonn	Bonna			
Bonn	Castra Bonnensis			
Cologne	Colonia Agrippina			
Essen	Assindia			
Hamburg	Hamburgum			
Kempten	Cambodunum			
Konstanz	Constantia			
Mainz	Mogontiacum			
Passau	Batavia			
Regensburg	Ratisbona			
Speyer	Spira			
Trier	Augusta Treverorum			
Wiesbaden	Aquæ Mattiacorum			
Worms	Vormatia			

== Greece ==
Greece Græcia
English name	Latin name	Endonym	Notes
Athens	Athenæ		
Corinth	Corinthus		
Gytheio	Gythium		
Heraklion	Heraclium		
Karystos	Carystus		
Kechries	Cencrheæ		
Laurium	Laurium		
Nafpaktos	Naupactus		
Nafplio	Nauplia		
Thessaloniki	Thessalonica		

== Hungary ==
Hungary Hungaria
English name	Latin name	Endonym	Notes
Budapest	Budapestinum		
Debrecen	Debrecinum		
Dunakeszi	Contra Constantiam		
Dunaújváros	Intercisa		
Eger	Agria		
Esztergom	Strigonium		
Győr	Iaurinum		
Kőszeg	Ginsium		
Mosonmagyaróvár	Mosonium		
Nagytétény	Campona		
Pécs	Sopianæ		
Sopron	Scarbantia		
Százhalombatta	Matrica		
Szeged	Segedinum		
Székesfehérvár	Alba Regia		
Szekszárd	Alisca		
Szentendre	Sanctæ Andræ		
Szombathely	Savaria		
Tác	Gorsium		

== Ireland ==
Ireland Irlandia
English name	Latin name	Endonym	Notes
Connacht	Connocia	Connacht	
Hill of Tara	Temro	Teamhair na Ríogh	
Leinster	Lagenia	Laighin	
Meath	Midia	Mí	
Munster	Momonia	Mumhain	
Ulster	Ultonia	Ulaidh	

== Netherlands ==
Netherlands Nederlandia
English name	Latin name	Endonym	Notes
Alphen aan den Rijn	Albania	Alphen aan den Rijn	
Leiden	Lugdunum Batavorum	Leiden	Meant Katwijk until the Renaissance
Maastricht	Mastrictum	Maastricht	
Nijmegen	Noviomagus Batavorum	Nijmegen	
Utrecht	Ultraiectum	Utrecht	
Valkenburg	Prætorium Agrippinæ	Valkenburg	
Vechten	Fectio	Vechten	
Voorburg	Forum Hadriani	Voorburg	
Wijk bij Duurstede	Levefanum	Wijk bij Duurstede	
Woerden	Laurum	Woerden	
Zwammerdam	Nigrum Pullum	Zwammerdam	

== Poland ==
Poland Polonia
English name	Latin name	Endonym	Notes
Kraków	Cracovia	Kraków	
Warsaw	Varsovia	Warszawa	
Wrocław	Vratislavia	Wrocław	
Świnoujście	Suenemundum	Świnoujście	
Poznań	Posnania	Poznań	

== Portugal ==
Portugal Portugallia
English name	Latin name	Endonym	Notes
Lisbon	Olisipo	Lisboa	

== Romania ==
Romania
English name	Latin name	Endonym	Notes
Alba-Iulia	Apulum		
Caransebeș	Tibiscum		
Cluj-Napoca	Claudiopolis		
Iglița-Turcoaia	Troesmis		
Mangalia	Callatis		
Turda	Potaissa		
Turnu-Severin	Drobeta		
Brașov	Brasovia		

== Russia ==
Russia
English name	Latin name	Endonym	Notes
Moscow	Moscua	Moskva	
Volgograd	Augusta Aorsorum	Volgograd	

== Serbia ==
Serbia
English name	Latin name	Endonym	Notes
Belgrade	Belogradum	Beograd	
Sremska Mitrovica	Sirmium, Civitas Sancti Demetrii	Sremska Mitrovica	
Niš	Naissus	Niš	
Gamzigrad	Felix Romuliana	Gamzigrad	

== Slovakia ==
Slovakia
English name	Latin name	Endonym	Notes
Bratislava	Bratislavia		
Banská Bystrica	Neosolium		
Košice	Cassovia		
Prešov	Eperiessinum		
Trenčín	Laugaricio		
Zvolen	Vetus Solium		

== Spain ==
Spain Hispania
English name	Latin name	Endonym		Notes
English name	Latin name	Name	Language	Notes
Alcalá de Henares	Alcala			
Alicante	Lucentum			
Almería	Portus Magnus			
Barcelona	Barcino			
Cádiz	Gades			
Calatayud	Bilbilis			
Cartagena	Carthago Nova			
Córdoba	Corduba			
Girona	Gerunda			
Granada	Granata			
Huelva	Onuba			
Huesca	Osca			
Jaca	Iaca			
Léon	Legio			
Lleida	Ilerda			
Lugo	Lucus Augusti			
Madrid	Matritum			
Mérida	Augusta Emerita			
Palma de Mallorca	Palma			
Salamanca	Salamantica			
Seville	Hispalis			
Tarragona	Tarraco			
Toledo	Toletum			
Valencia	Valentia			
Zaragoza	Cæsaraugusta			

== Sweden ==
Sweden Suecia
English name	Latin name	Endonym	Notes
Gävle	Gevalia	Gävle	
Gothenburg	Gothoburgum	Göteborg	
Malmö	Malmogia	Malmö	
Stockholm	Holmia	Stockholm	

== Switzerland ==
Switzerland Helvetia
English name	Latin name	Endonym		Notes
English name	Latin name	Name	Language	Notes
Bern	Berna	Bern	German	
Geneva	Genava	Gèneve	French	
Zürich	Turicum	Zürich	German	

== Turkey ==
Turkey Turcia
English name	Latin name	Endonym	Notes
Antakya	Antiochia	Antakya	
Edirne	Hadrianopolis	Edirne	
Edremit	Adramyttium	Edremit	
Ereǧli	Heraclea Cybistra	Ereǧli	
Erzurum	Theodosiopolis	Erzurum	
Eskişehir	Dorylæum	Eskişehir	
Gaziantep	Antiochia ad Taurum	Gaziantep	
İstanbul	Byzantium	İstanbul	
İstanbul	Constantinopolis	İstanbul	
İstanbul	Nova Roma	İstanbul	
İzmir	Smyrna	İzmir	
İzmit	Nicomedia	İzmit	
İznik	Nicæa	İznik	
Karadeniz Ereğli	Heraclea Pontica	Karadeniz Ereğli	
Kayseri	Cæsarea	Kayseri	
Konya	Iconium	Konya	
Kütahya	Cotyæum	Kütahya	
Malatya	Melitene	Malatya	
Marmara Ereǧlisi	Heraclea Perinthus	Marmara Ereǧlisi	
Niksar	Neocæsarea	Niksar	

== Ukraine ==
Ukraine Ucraina
English name	Latin name	Endonym	Notes
Lviv	Leopolis		

== United Kingdom ==
United Kingdom Britannium Regnum
English name	Latin name	Endonym		Notes
English name	Latin name	Name	Language	Notes
Bath	Aquæ Sulis	Bath	English	
Canterbury	Cantuaria	Canterbury	English	
Carlisle	Carleolum	Carlisle	English	
Chelmsford	Caesaromagus	Chelmsford	English	
Chester	Cestria	Chester	English	
Colchester	Camulodunum, Colcestria	Colchester	English	
Dover	Dubris	Dover	English	
Edinburgh	Edinburgum	Dùn Èideann	Scottish Gaelic	
Edinburgh	Edinburgum	Edinburgh	English, Scots	
Gloucester	Glocestria	Gloucester	English	
Leicester	Leicestria	Leicester	English	
Lincoln	Lindum	Lincoln	English	
London	Londinium	London	English	
Manchester	Mancunium, Mancestria	Manchester	English	
Newcastle upon Tyne	Novum Castrum	Newcastle upon Tyne	English	
Richborough	Rutupiæ	Richborough	English	
Saint Albans	Villa Sancti Albani	Saint Albans	English	
Winchester	Vintonia	Winchester	English	
Wroxeter	Viroconium Cornoviorum	Wroxeter	English	
York	Eboracum, Eburacum	York	English	

== See also ==
- List of European exonyms
