= Portuguese exonyms =

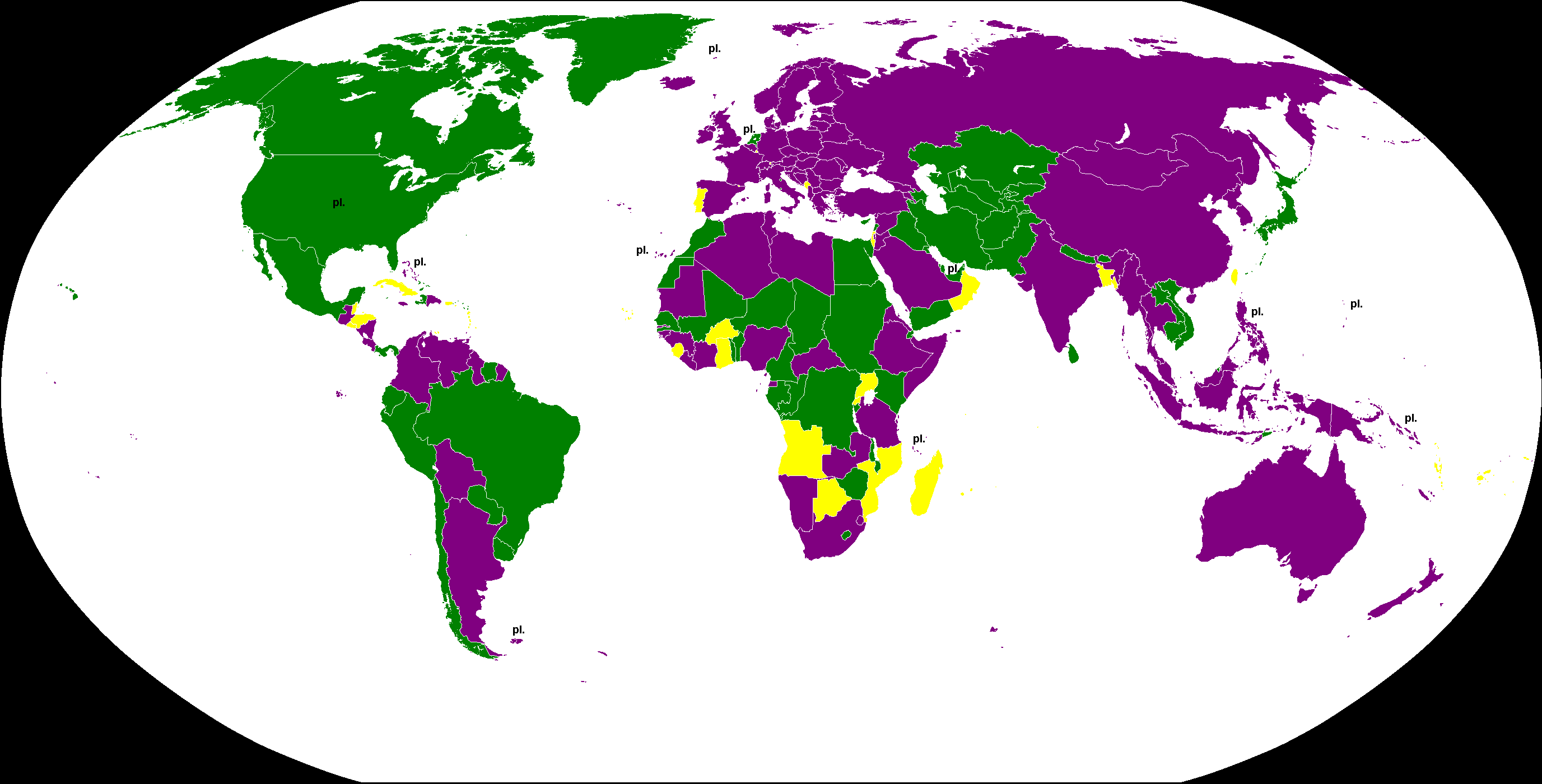
Genders of country names in Portuguese: masculine (green) - e.g. O Brasil, feminine (purple) - e.g. A Argélia, and gender omitted (yellow) - e.g. Portugal

Below is a list of Portuguese language exonyms for places in non-Portuguese-speaking areas. Some of them are used exclusively in European Portuguese (marked E) while others appear just in Brazilian Portuguese (marked B).

Some of these terms are becoming disused, being often replaced with others closer to the original spelling. Adoptions of foreign terms and names in general are more acceptable and easy to enter popular use in the Brazilian variety, with spelling pronunciations or not.

== Afghanistan ==
Afghanistan Afeganistão
English name	Portuguese name	Endonym (Arabic)
Kabul	Cabul, Cábul	کابل

== Albania ==
Albania Albânia
English name	Portuguese name	Endonym (Albanian)
Shkodër	Escútare, Escodra	Shkodër
Tirana	Tirana	Tiranë

== Armenia ==
Armenia Arménia (E), Armênia (B)
English name	Portuguese name	Endonym (Armenian)
Yerevan	Erevã, Ierevã	Երևան

== Austria ==
Austria Áustria
English name	Portuguese name	Endonym (German)
Carinthia	Caríntia	Kärnten
Danube	Danúbio	Donau
Innsbruck	Insbruque	Innsbrück
Salzburg	Salzburgo, Salisburgo	Salzburg
Styria	Estíria	Steiermark
Vienna	Viena	Wien

== Australia ==
Australia Austrália
English name (also endonym)	Portuguese name		
English name (also endonym)	Portuguese name	Canberra	Camberra
New South Wales	Nova Gales do Sul		
Northern Territory	Território do Norte		
Queensland	Queenslândia		
South Australia	Austrália Meridional, Austrália do Sul		
Tasmania	Tasmânia		
Victoria	Vitória		
Western Australia	Austrália Ocidental, Austrália do Oeste		

== Azerbaijan ==
Azerbaijan Azerbaijão
English name	Portuguese name	Endonym (Azerbaijani)
Baku	Bacu	Bakı

== Belgium ==
Belgium Bélgica
English name	Portuguese name	Endonym	
English name	Portuguese name	Name	Language
Antwerp	Antuérpia	Antwerpen	Dutch
Bruges	Bruges	Brugge	Dutch
Brussels	Bruxelas	Bruxelles	French
Flandres	Flandres	Vlaanderen	Dutch
Ghent	Gante	Gent	Dutch
Leuven	Lovaina	Leuven	Dutch
Meuse	Mosa	Maas	Dutch
Scheldt	Escalda	Escaut, Scheldt	French, Dutch
Wallonia	Valónia (E), Valônia (B)	Wallonie	French

== Belize ==
Belize Belize
English name	Portuguese name	Endonym	
English name	Portuguese name	Name	Language
Belize City	Cidade de Belize	Belize City	English
Belmopan	Belmopã	Belmopan	Yucatec Maya

== Bulgaria ==
Bulgaria Bulgária
English name	Portuguese name	Endonym (Bulgarian)
Sofia	Sófia	Sofiya (София)

== Canada ==
Canada Canadá
English name	Portuguese name	Endonym	
English name	Portuguese name	Name	Language
British Columbia	Colúmbia Britânica, Colômbia Britânica	British Columbia	English
New Brunswick	Novo Brunswick, Nova Brunswick, Novo Brunsvique, Nova Brunsvique	New Brunswick	English
Newfoundland	Terra Nova	Newfoundland	English
Northwest Territories	Territórios do Noroeste	Northwest Territories, Nunatsiaq (ᓄᓇᑦᓯᐊᖅ)	English, Inuktitut
Nova Scotia	Nova Escócia	Nova Scotia, Alba Nuadh	English, French
Ontario	Ontário	Ontario	English
Ottawa	Otava	Ottawa	English
Quebec	Quebeque	Québec, Quebec	French, English

== China ==
China China
English name	Portuguese name	Endonym	
English name	Portuguese name	Name	Language
Beijing	Pequim	Běijīng (北京)	Chinese
Guangzhou	Cantão	Guǎngzhōu (广州), Gwongzau (廣州)	Chinese, Cantonese
Nanjing	Nanquim	Nánjīng (南京)	Chinese
Shanghai	Xangai	Shànghǎi (上海)	Chinese

== Croatia ==
Croatia Croácia
English name	Portuguese name	Endonym (Croatian)
Zagreb	Zagrebe, Zagábria	Zagreb

== Cuba ==
Cuba Cuba
English and Portuguese name	Endonym (Spanish)
Havana	La Habana

== Cyprus ==
Cyprus Chipre
English name	Portuguese name	Endonym	
English name	Portuguese name	Name	Language
Limassol	Limassol	Limesós (Λεμεσός)	Greek
Nicosia	Nicósia	Leukosía (Λευκωσία)/Nikosia (Νικοσια), Lefkoşa	Greek, Turkish
Paphos	Pafos	Πάφος (Páfos)	Greek

== Czech Republic ==
Czech Republic Chéquia (E), Tchéquia (B)
English name	Portuguese name	Endonym (Czech)
Brno	Brum, Bruno	Brno
Prague	Praga	Praha
Plzeň	Pilsen, Pilzem	Plzeň
Sudetenland	Sudetas (Europe), Sudetos (Brazil)	Sudety
Sudetes	Sudetas (Europe), Sudetos (Brazil)	Sudety

== Democratic Republic of the Congo ==
Democratic Republic of the Congo República Democrática do Congo
English name	Portuguese name	Endonym (French, Lingala)
Kinshasa	Quinxassa, Quinxasa, Kinshasa	Kinshasa, Kinsásá

== Denmark ==
Denmark Dinamarca
English name	Portuguese name	Endonym	
English name	Portuguese name	Name	Language
Copenhagen	Copenhaga (E), Copenhague (B)	København	Danish
Frisia	Frísia	Frisland	Danish
Greenland	Gronelândia (E), Groenlândia (B)	Kalaallit Nunaat, Grønland	Greenlandic, Danish
Jutland	Jutlândia	Jylland	Danish

== Dominican Republic ==
Dominican Republic República Dominicana
English name	Portuguese name	Endonym (Spanish)	Notes
Santo Domingo	São Domingos	Santo Dominco	Literally "St. Dominic" in English

== Egypt ==
Egypt Egito
English name	Portuguese name	Endonym (standard and Egyptian Arabic)	Notes
Alexandria	Alexandria	الإسكندرية (al-Iskandariyya), اسكندريه (Eskendereyya)	from Greek
Cairo	Cairo	القاهرة (al-Qāhirah)	

== Estonia ==
Estonia Estónia (E), Estônia (B)
English name	Portuguese name	Endonym (Estonian)
Tallinn	Talim, Talin, Taline, Tallinn	Tallinn

== Ethiopia ==
Ethiopia Etiópia
English name	Portuguese name	Endonym (Amharic, Oromo)
Addis Ababa	Adis Abeba	አዲስ አበባ (Ādīsi Ābeba), Finfinnee

== Finland ==
Finland Finlândia
English name	Portuguese name	Endonym	
English name	Portuguese name	Name	Language
Åland	Alanda (E), Alândia	Åland, Ahvenanmaa	Swedish, Finnish
Helsinki	Helsínquia (E), Helsinque (B)	Helsinki, Helsingfors	Finnish, Swedish
Lapland	Lapónia (E), Lapônia (B)	Lappi, Lapland	Lappi: Finnish, Northern Sami, Inari Sami and Skolt Sami; Lapland: Swedish

== France ==
France França
English name	Portuguese name	Endonym		Notes
English name	Portuguese name	Name	Language	Notes
Ajaccio	Ajácio	Ajaccio, Aiacciu/Aghjacciu	French, Corsican	
Alpes-de-Haute Provence	Alpes da Alta Provença	Alpes-de-Haute Provence, Aups d'Auta Provença	French, Provençal Occitan	
Alpes-Maritimes	Alpes Marítimos	Alpes-Maritimes, Aups Maritims	French, Provençal Occitan	
Alsace	Alsácia	Alsace, Elsàss	French, Alsatian	
Angoulême	Angolema	Angoulême, Engoleime, Engoulaeme	French, Occitan, Poitevin-Saintongeais	
Ardennes	Ardenas	Ardennes	French	
Ariège	Arieja	Ariège, Arièja	French, Occitan	
Arras	Arrás	Arras, Aros	French, Picard	
Aquitaine	Aquitânia	Aquitaine, Aguiéne, Akitania, Aquitània	French, Poitevin-Saintongeais, Basque, Occitan	
Ardèche	Ardecha	Ardèche, Ardecha	French, Arpitan and Occitan	
Artois	Artésia	Artois, Artoé	French, Picard	
Auvergne	Auvérnia, Auvérna, Auverna	Auvergne; Auvèrnhe/Auvèrnha	French, Occitan	
Auvergne-Rhône-Alpes	Auvérnia-Ródano-Alpes	Auvergne-Rhône-Alpes, Auvèrnhe Ròse Aups, Ôvèrgne-Rôno-Ârpes	French, Occitan, Arpitan	
Avignon	Avinhão	Avignon, Avignoun/Avinhon	French, Provençal	
Bas-Poitou	Baixo Poitou, Baixa Pictávia	Bas-Poitou	French	Ancient French department; literally "Lower Poitou" or "Low Poitou"
Bas-Rhin	Baixo Reno	Bas-Rhin, 's Unterlànd/Unterelsàss/Ingerlànd	French, Alsatian	
Basse-Terre	Baixa-Terra, Terra(s) Baixa(s)	Basse-Terre, Bastè	French, Guadeloupean French Creole	
Bayonne	Baiona	Bayonne, Baiona	French, Basque	
Besançon	Besanção, Vesanção, Vesôntia, Vesôntio, Visôntia, Visôntio	Besançon	French and Arpitan	
Bordeaux	Bordéus (E, B)	Bordeaux, Bordèu	French, Occitan	
Bouches-du-Rhône	Bocas do Ródano	Bouches-du-Rhône, Bocas de Ròse	French, Occitan	
Boulogne-sur-Mer	Bolonha-sobre-o-Mar/Bolonha do Mar	Boulogne-sur-Mer, Boulonne-su-Mér, Bonen	French, Picard, West Flemish	
Bourges	Burges	Bourges	French	
Bourgogne-Franche-Comté	Borgonha-Franco-Condado	Bourgogne-Franche-Comté, Borgogne-Franche-Comtât	French, Arpitan	Literally "Burgundy-Free County"
Brest	Bresta	Brest	French and Breton	
Burgundy	Borgonha	Bourgogne, Borgogne, Bregogne	French, Arpitan, Burgundian	
Brittany	Bretanha	Bretagne, Bertaèyn/Bertègn, Breizh	French, Gallo, Breton	
Calais	Calêsio (B), Calésio (E)	Calais, Kales	French, West Flemish	
Carcassonne	Carcassona	Carcassonne, Carcassona	French, Occitan	
Cambrai	Cambraia	Cambrai, Kamerijk, Kimbré	French, West Flemish, Picard	Historically known in English as "Camerick" or "Camericke"
Cayenne	Caiena	Cayenne, Kayenn	French, Guianese Creole French	
Centre-Val de Loire	Centro-Vale do Líger	Centre-Val de Loire	French	Literally "Centre-Loire Valley"
Cévennes	Cevenas	Cévennes, Cevena/Cevenas	French, Occitan	
Champagne	Champanhe, Champanha (E, B)	Champagne	French	
Charente	Carântono	Charente, Charanta, Chérente	French, Occitan, Saintongese	
Charente-Maritime	Carântono Marítimo	Charente-Maritime, Charanta Maritimam, Chérente-Marine	French, Occitan, Poitevin-Saintongeais	
Cherbourg-Octeville	Cherburgo-Octeville	Cherbourg-Octeville	French	
Compiègne	Compienha	Compiègne, Compiène	French, Picard	
Corsica	Córsega	Corse, Corsica	French, Corsican	
Côte-d'Or	Costa de Ouro	Côte-d'Or	French	Literally "Gold Coast"
Côtes-d'Armor	Costas da Armória	Côtes-d'Armor, Aodoù-an-Arvor	French, Breton	
Dieppe	Diepa	Dieppe, Dgieppe	French, Norman	
Dordogne	Dordonha	Dordogne, Dordonha	French, Occitan	
Douai	Duaco	Douai, Doï	French, Picard	Formerly spelled in English as "Doway" or "Douay"
Draguignan	Draguinhão	Draguignan, Draguinhan	French, Occitan	
Drôme	Droma	Drôme, Droma	French, Arpitan and Occitan	
Dunkirk	Dunquerque	Dunkerque, Duunkerke	French, French Flemish	
Eure-et-Loire	Eure e Líger	Eure-et-Loire	French	
Finistère	Finisterra, Fenisterra	Finistère, Penn-ar-Bed	French, Breton	
Franche-Comté	Franco-Condado	Franche-Comté, Fraintche-Comtè, Franche-Comtât	French, Frainc-Comtou, Arpitan	
French Guiana	Guiana Francesa	Guyane (française), Lagwiyann	French, Guianese Creole French	
Fort-de-France	Forte da França (B), Forte de França (E)	Fort-de-France, Fodfwans	French, Martinican Creole	Literally "Fort of France"
Gard	Gardão	Gard	French and Occitan	
Gascony	Gasconha	Gascogne, Gasconha	French, Gascon	
Gironde	Gironda	Gironde, Gironda	French, Occitan	
Grenoble	Grenobla, Granobra	Grenoble, Grenòble/Graçanòbol, Grenoblo/Grainóvol	French, Occitan, Arpitan	
Guadeloupe	Guadalupe	Guadeloupe, Gwadloup	French, Guadeloupean Creole French	
Guyenne/Guienne	Guiena	Guyenne, Guiana	French, Occitan	Ancient French province
Haut-Poitou	Alto Poitou, Alta Pictávia	Haut-Poitou	French	Ancient French department; literally "High Poitou" or "Upper Poitou"
Haut-Rhin	Alto Reno	Haut-Rhin, 's Owerlànd, Owerelsàss	French, Alsatian	
Haut-Vienne	Alto Viena, Alta Viena	Haute-Vienne, Nauta Vinhana/Viena	French, Occitan	
Haute-Garonne	Alto Garona	Haute-Garonne, Nauta Garona	French, Occitan	
Hautes-Pyrénées	Altos Pirenéus/Pirinéus (P), Altos Pireneus (B)	Hautes-Pyrénées, Altos Pirineos, Alts Pirineus, Nauts Pirenèus	French, Spanish, Catalan, Occitan	
Hauts-de-Seine	Altos do Sena	Hauts-de-Seine	French	Literally "Seine Heights"
Hendaye	Hendaia	Hendaye, Hendaia, Hendaya	French, Basque, Spanish	
Île-de-France	Ilha de França	Île-de-França	French	Literally "Isle of France"
Indre-et-Loire	Indre e Líger	Indre-et-Loire	French	
Isère	Isera	Isère, Isera, Isèra	French, Arpitan, Occitan	
Languedoc-Roussillon	Languedoque-Rossilhão	Languedoc-Roussillon, Lengadòc-Rosselhon, Llenguadoc-Rosselló	French, Occitan, Catalan	
La Rochelle	Rochela, Arrochela	La Rochelle, La Rochéle	French, Poitevin-Saintongeais	
Le Havre	Havre/O Havre	Le Havre, Lé Hâvre	French, Norman	
Lille	Lila	Lille, Lile, Rysel	French, Picard, West Flemish	
Lorraine	Lorena	Lorraine, Louréne, Lottringe	French, Lorrain, Lorraine Franconian	
Loire	Líger	Loire, Léger, Lêre, Liger	French, Occitan, Arpitan, Breton	
Loire-Atlantique	Líger-Atlântico	Loire-Atlantique, Liger-Atlantel, Louére-Atantique	French, Breton, Gallo	Literally "Atlantic Loire"
Lot-et-Garonne	Lot e Garona, Lote e Garona	Lot-et-Garonne, Ólt e Garona	French, Occitan	
Lourdes	Lurdes	Lourdes, Lorda	French, Occitan	
Lyon	Lião (E)	Lyons, Liyon	French, Arpitan	
Maine-et-Loire	Maine e Loire, Maine e Líger	Maint-et-Loire	French	
Mamoudzou	Mamudzu	Mamoudzou	French	
Marne	Marna	Marne	French	
Marseille(s)	Marselha	Marseille, Marselha	French, Provençal Occitan	
Martinique	Martinica	Martinique, Madinina/Madiana, Matinik/Matnik	French, Martinican Creole, Kalinago	
Mayotte	Maiote	Mayotte	French	
Meuse/Maas	Mosa	Meuse, Maos, Moûse	French, Limbourgish, Walloon	Maas is the Dutch endonym for the river Meuse
Metz	Métis	Metz	French	
Morbihan	Morbinhão, Morvinhão	Morbihan, Mor-Bihan	French, Breton	
Moselle	Mosela	Moselle	French	
Nancy	Nanci	Nancy	French	
Narbonne	Narbona	Narbonne, Narbona	French, Occitan	
Nîmes	Nimes	Nîmes, Nimes	French, Occitan	
Normandy	Normandia	Normandie, Normaundie/Nouormandie	French, Norman	
Nouvelle-Aquitaine	Nova Aquitânia	Nouvelle-Aquitaine, Akitania Berria, Nòva Aquitània, Novéle-Aguiéne	French, Basque, Occitan, Poitevin-Saintongeais	Literally "New Aquitaine"
Occitania	Occitânia	Occitanie, Occitània	French, Occitan and Catalan	
Orléans	Orleães (E), Orleans (E)	Orléans	French	
Pays de la Loire	País do Loire, País do Líger	Pays de la Loirre, Broioù al Liger, Paeiz de la Leirr, Paes de la Loere	French, Breton, Gallo, Poitevin-Saitongeais	Literally "Lands of the Loire"
Perpignan	Perpinhão (E), Perpinhã (B)	Perpignan, Perpiñán, Perpinhan, Perpinyà	French, Spanish, Occitan, Catalan	
Picardy	Picardia	Picardie	French, Picard	
Provence	Provença	Provence, Provença	French, Provençal Occitan	
Provence-Alpes-Côte d' Azur	Provença-Alpes-Costa Azul	Provence-Alpes-Côte d' Azur, Provença-Aups-Còsta d'Azur	French, Provençal Occitan	
Pyrenees	Pirenéus/Pirinéus (E), Pireneus (B)	Pyrénées, Auñamendiak/Pirinioak, Pirenèus, Pirineos, Pirineus	French, Basque, Aragonese and Occitan, Spanish, Catalan	
Pyrénées-Atlantiques	Pirenéus/Pirinéus Atlânticos (E), Pireneus Atlânticos (B)	Pyrénées-Atlantiques, Pirenèus Atlantics, Pirinio Atlantikoak	French, Gascon Occitan, Basque	Literally "Atlantic Pyrenees" in English
Pyrénées-Orientales	Pirinéus/Pirinéus Orientais (E), Pireneus Orientais (B)	Pyrénées-Orientales, Pirenèus Orientals, Pirineus Orientals	French, Occitan, Catalan	Literally "Eastern Pyrenees" in English
Réunion	Reunião	La Réunion, La Rényon	French, Réunion Creole French	
Rhone	Ródano	Rhône, Rôno, Ròse	French, Arpitan, Occitan	
Rouen	Ruão (E, B)	Rouen	French and Norman	
Saint-Denis	São Dinis	Saint-Denis, Sin-Dni	French, Réunion Creole French	
Saint-Jean-de-Luz	São João da Luz	Saint-Jean-de-Luz, Donibane Lohi(t)zune	French, Basque	
Saint-Jean-de-Monts	São João dos Montes	Saint-Jean-de-Monts	French	
Saint-Paul	São Paulo	Saint-Paul	French	
Saint-Quentin	São Quentino	Saint-Quentin, Saint-Kinton	French, Picard	
Saône-et-Loire	Sona e Líger	Saône-et-Loire, Sona-et-Lêre	French, Arpitan	
Seine	Sena	Seine	French	
Seine-et-Marne	Sena e Marna	Seine-et-Marne	French	
Seine-Saint-Denis	Sena-São Dinis	Seine-Saint-Denis	French	
Seine-Maritime	Sena Marítimo	Seine-Maritime	French	
Southern Corsica	Córsega do Sul	Corse-du-Sud, Corsica suttana/Pumonte/Pumonti	French, Corsican	
Strasbourg	Estrasburgo	Strasbourg, Strossburi	French, North Alsatian	
Tarn-et-Garone	Tarne e Garona	Tarn-et-Garone, Tarn e Garona	French, Occitan	
Territoire de Belfort	Território de Belfort(e)	Territoire de Belfort	French	Literally "Territory of Belfort" or "Belfort Territory"
Toulouse	Tolosa	Toulouse, Tolosa	French, Occitan	
Tours	Toures	Tours	French	
Upper Alps	Altos Alpes	Hautes-Alpes, Auts Aups	French, Occitan	
Upper Corsica	Alta Córsega	Haute-Corse, Cismonte/Alta Corsica	French, Corsican	
Upper Loire	Alto Loire, Alto Líger	Haute-Loire, Naut Léger/Naut Leir	French, Occitan	
Upper Marne	Alto Marna	Haute-Marne	French	
Upper Saône	Alto Sona	Haute-Saône, Hâte-Saône	French, Fainc-Comtou	
Upper Savoy	Alta Saboia	Haute-Savoie, Savouè d'Amont	French, Arpitan	
Val-de-Marne	Vale do Marna	Val-de-Marne	French	Literally "Vale of the Marne"
Val-d'Oise	Vale do Oise	Val-d'Oise	French	Literally "Vale of the Oise"
Vaucluse	Valclusa	Vaucluse, Vauclusa/Vau-Cluso	French, Provençal Occitan	
Vendee	Vendeia	Vendée	French	
Verdun	Verdum	Verdun	French	
Versailles	Versalhes	Versailles	French	
Vienne	Viena (E)	Vienne, Vièna	French, Arpitan	Located in the Department of Isère
Vienne	Viena (E)	Vienne	French and Poitevin-Saintongeais	Department of the same name (Vienne)
Vosges	Vosgos	Vosges	French	

== Germany ==
Germany Alemanha
English name	Portuguese name	Endonym		Notes
English name	Portuguese name	Name	Language	Notes
Aachen	Aquisgrano (B), Aquisgrão (E)	Aachen, Oche	German, Aachen dialect	Previously known as "Aix-la-Chapelle" historically in English
Augsburg	Augsburgo	Augsburg, Ougschburg	German, Swabian German	
Baden	Bade	Baden	German	
Bavaria	Baviera, Bavária	Bayern	German and Bavarian	
Berlin	Berlim	Berlin	German	
Bernburg	Bernemburgo	Bernburg	German	
Bonn	Bona (E)	Bonn	German	
Borkum	Borcuma	Borkum, Börkum	German, Low German	
Brandenburg	Brandemburgo	Brandenburg	German	
Bremen	Brema (E)	Bremen, Breem/Bräm	German, Low German	
Brunswick	Brunsvique (E, B)	Braunschweig, Bronswiek	German, Low German	
Burgenlandkreis	(Distrito da) Burguenlândia	Burgenlandkreis	German	Literally "District of Burgenland"
Central Saxony	Saxónia Central/Média Saxónia (E); Saxônia Central/Média Saxônia (B)	Mittelsachsen	German	
Coburg	Coburgo	Coburg	German	
Cologne	Colónia (E), Colônia (B)	Köln, Kölle	German, Kölsch	
Dahme-Spreewald	Dahme-Floresta do Espreia, Dahme-Floresta do Spree	Dahme-Spreewald, Wokrejs Damna-Błota	German, Lower Sorbian	
Dessau-Roßlau	Dessávia-Roßlau, Dessávia-Rosslau	Dessau-Roßlau	German	
Dithmarschen	Ditemarcha	Dithmarschen	German	Archaic English: Ditmarch
Duchy of Lauenburg	Ducado de Lauemburgo	Herzogtum Lauenburg	German	
Dresden	Dresda (E)	Dresden, Dräsdn, Drježdźany	German, Upper Saxon, Upper Sorbian	
Elbe	Elba	Elbe, Ilv/Elv, Łobjo	German, Low German, Upper and Lower Sorbian	
Erzgebirgskreis	(Distrito dos) Montes Metalíferos			
Eutin	Eutim, Utim	Eutin	German	
Frankfurt	Francoforte	Frankfurt, Frangford	German, Hessian	"Frankfort" is an archaic English name for Frankfurt
Frankfurt am Main	Francoforte sobre o Meno, Francoforte do Meno	Frankfurt am Main, Frankfurt am Maa	German, Hessian	Literally "Frank ford on the Main"
Frankfurt an der Oder	Francoforte sobre o Óder, Francoforte do Óder	Frankfurt an der Oder, Frankfort an de Oder, Frankfurt nad Odrą	German, Central Marchian, Polish	Literally "Frank ford on the Oder"
Freiberg	Friberga	Freiberg	German	
Freiburg	Friburgo (E)	Freiburg, Friburg	German, Allemanic German	
Freiburg im Breisgau	Friburgo na Brisgóvia (E)	Freiburg im Breisgau, Friburg im Brisgau	German, Alemannic German	
Frisia	Frísia	Frieslande/Groß-Friesland, Fraislaand, Fräislound	German, Low Saxon, East Frisian	
Gotha	Gota	Gotha	German	
Göttingen	Gotinga (E)	Göttingen, Chöttingen	German, Low German	
Hamburg	Hamburgo	Hamburg, Hamborg	German, Low German	
Hamelin	Hamelim (E)	Hameln	German	
Hanover	Hanôver	Hannover, Hannober	German, Low German	
Harburg	Harburgo	Harburg	German	
Heidekreis	Distrito da Charneca	Heidekreis	German	Literally "Heath District"
Heidelberg	Heidelberga	Heidelberg, Heidlberg	German, Palatine German	
Hesse/Hessia	Héssia	Hessen	German	
Kiel	Quiel, Quília	Kiel	German	
Koblenz	Coblença (E)	Koblenz	German	
Konstanz	Constança (E)	Konstanz	German, Allemanic German	Traditionally known as "Constance" in English
Leipzig	Lípsia	Leipzig, Leibz'sch, Lipsk	German, Upper Saxon, Upper Sorbian	
Lower Saxony	Baixa Saxónia (E), Baixa Saxônia (B)	Niedersachsen, Neddersassen, Läichsaksen	German, Low German, Saterland Frisian	
Lübeck	Lubeca, Lubeque	Lübeck, Lübęk/Lübeek	German, Low German	
Lunenburg	Luneburgo	Lüneburg, Lümborg	German, Low German	
Magdeburg	Magdeburgo, Madeburgo	Magdeburg, Meideborg	German, Low German	
Mainz	Mogúncia (E)	Mainz, Määnz/Meenz	German, Hessian German	
Mecklenburg	Meclemburgo	Mecklenburg, Mękel(n)borg	German, Low German	
Mecklenburgische Seenplatte	Planalto Lacustre de Meclemburgo	Mecklenburgische Seenplatte	German	
Mecklenburg-Vorpommern	Meclemburgo-Pomerânia Ocidental	Mecklenburg-Vorpommern	German	Can be also called as "Mecklenburg-Western Pomerania" or even "Mecklenburg-Cispomerania"
Meißen	Mísnia (B)	Meißen, Mišnjo	German, Low Sorbian	
Merseburg	Merseburgo, Mersemburgo	Merseburg, Mjezybor	German, Sorbian languages	
Munich	Munique	München, Minga	German, Bavaria	
Naumburg	Naumburgo	Naumburg	German	
Neubrandenburg	Nova Brandemburgo	Neubrandenburg	German	
Nienburg	Niemburgo	Nienburg, Nienborg/Neenborg/Negenborg	German, Low German	
North Frisia	Frísia do Norte	Nordfriesland, Noordfreesland, Nordfraschlönj	German, Low German, North Frisian	
North Saxony	Saxónia do Norte (E)/Saxônia do Norte (B)	Nordsachsen		
Northwestern Mecklemburg	Meclemburgo do Noroeste	Nordwestmecklenburg	German	
Nuremberg	Nuremberga (E), Nuremberg (B), Nurembergue (B)	Nürnberg, Namberch, Niamberg	German, East Franconian, Bavarian	
Oberhavel	Alto Havel	Oberhavel, Hornja Habola	German, Upper Sorbian	
Oberspreewald-Lausitz	Alta Floresta do Espreia-Lusácia	Oberspreewald-Lausitz, Wokrejs Górne Błota-Łužyca, Wokrjes Hornje Błóta-Łužica	German, Upper Sorbian, Lower Sorbian	
Oder-Spree	Óder-Espreia	Oder-Spree, Wódra-Sprjewja, Odra-Sprjewja	German, Upper Sorbian, Lower Sorbian	
Oldenburg	Oldemburgo	Oldenburg, Ollnborg	German, Northern Low Saxon	
Osnabrück	Osnabruque	Osnabrück, Ossenbrügge	German, Westphalian German	Archaic English: Osnabrug
Ostholstein	Holsácia Oriental	Ostholstein	German	Literally "West(ern) Holsatia"
Pinneberg	Pineberga, Peneberga	Pinneberg, Pinnbarg	German, Northern Low Saxon	
Pomerania	Pomerânia	Pommern, Pòmòrskô, Pomorze	German, Kashubian, Polish	
Regensburg	Ratisbona (E), Regensburgo	Regensburg, Rengschburg/Rengschburch	German, Bavarian	Historically known in English as Ratisbon
Rendsburg	Rendesburgo	Rendsburg	German	
Rhine	Reno	Rhein, Rhi(n)	German, Alemannic German	
Rhineland	Renânia	Rheinland, Rhingland	German, Kölsch	
Rostock	Rostoque, Rostoca	Rostock, Roztoc	German, Polabian	
Rotenburg	Rotemburgo, Rutemburgo	Rotenburg	German	
Saarland	Sarre	Saarland	German	
Saxony	Saxónia (E), Saxônia (B)	Sachsen, Saggsn, Sakska	German, Upper Saxon, Upper Sorbian	
Saxon Switzerland-Eastern Ore Mountains	Suíça Saxã-Montes Metalíferos Orientais	Sächsische Schweiz-Osterzgebirge, Sakska Šwica-Wuchodne Rudne hory	German, Upper Sorbian	
Saxony-Anhalt	Saxônia-Anhalt (B), Saxónia-Anhalt (E), Alta Saxônia (B), Alta Saxónia (E)	Sachsen-Anhalt, Sassen-Anholt	German, Low German	
Schaumburg	Schaumburgo	Schaumburg	German	
Schleswig-Holstein	Eslésvico-Holsácia	Schleswig-Holstein, Sleswig-Holsteen, Slaswik-Holstiinj	German, Low German, North Frisian	Occasionally called as "Sleswick-Holsatia" in English
Schleswig-Flensburg	Eslésvico-Flensburgo	Schleswig-Flensburg	German	
Schmalkalden	Esmalcalda	Schmalkalden	German	
Segeberg	Segeberga	Segeberg, Segebärj	German, North Frisian	
Stuttgart	Estugarda (E, B)	Stuttgart, Schduagert	German, Swabian German	
Thuringia	Turíngia	Thüringen	German	
Tübingen	Tubinga (E)	Tübingen, Dibenga	German, Swabian German	
Wesermarsch	Lezíria do Weser	Wesermarsch	German	
Westphalia	Vestefália (E), Vestfália (B)	Westfalen	German, Low German	
Wittenberg	Vitemberga	Wittenberg		
Wolfenbüttel	Volfembutel	Wolfenbüttel, Wulfenbüddel	German, Low German	
Wolfsburg	Wolfsburgo, Wolfesburgo, Volfesburgo	Wolfsburg, Wulfsborg	German, Eastphalian Low German	
Württemberg	Vurtemburga (E)	Württemberg	German	
Würzburg	Vurzburgo	Würzburg, Wörtzburch	German, Main-Franconian German	
Zwickau	Esvícaro	Zwickau, Šwikawa	German, Upper Sorbian	

== Greece ==
Greece Grécia
English name	Portuguese name	Endonym (Greek)
Athens	Atenas	
Attica	Ática	
Boeotia	Beócia	
Cephalonia	Cefalónia (E), Cefalônia (B)	
Corfu	Corfu	Kerkýra
Corinth	Corinto	
Crete	Creta	
Cyclades	Cíclades	
Dodecanese	Dodecaneso	
Epirus	Épiro	
Euboea	Eubeia	
Ionian Islands	Ilhas Jónicas (E), Ilhas Jônicas (B)	
Macedonia	Macedónia (E), Macedônia (B)	
Marathon	Maratona	
Nafpaktos	Lepanto	
Peloponnese	Peloponeso	
Piraeus	Pireu	
Rhodes	Rodes	
Samothrace	Samotrácia	
Sparta	Esparta	
Thebes	Tebas	
Thessaloniki	(Tes)salónica (E), (Tes)salônica (B)	
Thessaly	Tessália	
Thrace	Trácia	
Zakynthos	Zaquintos	

== Guatemala ==
Guatemala Guatemala
English name	Portuguese name	Endonym (Spanish)
Guatemala City	Cidade da Guatemala	Ciudad de Guatemala

== Haiti ==
Haiti Haiti
English name	Portuguese name	Endonym (Haitian)
Port-au-Prince	Porto Príncipe, Porto do Príncipe	Pòtoprens

== India ==
India Índia
English name	Portuguese name	Endonym		Notes
English name	Portuguese name	Name	Language	Notes
Daman	Damão			
Hyderabad	Hiderabade			
Kashmir	Caxemira (E, B)			
Kolkata	Calcutá	Kólkata	Bengali	
Mumbai	Bombaim	Mumbaī	Maratha	
New Delhi	Nova Deli, Nova Delhi, Nova Déli			
Panaji	Pangim, Nova Goa			"Nova Goa" is a historical name

== Indonesia ==
Indonesia Indonésia
English name	Portuguese name	Endonym	
English name	Portuguese name	Name	Language
Aceh	Achém	Aceh	
Ambon	Amboíno, Ambão		
Borneo	Bornéu	Kalimantan	Indonesian
Jakarta	Jacarta		
Kupang	Cupao		
Makassar	Macáçar, Macaçar		
Palembang	Palimbão		
Sulawesi	Celebes		

== Iran ==
Iran Irão (E), Irã (B)
English name	Portuguese name		
English name	Portuguese name	Tehran	Teerão (E), Teerã (B)

== Iraq ==
Iraq Iraque
English name	Portuguese name	Endonym (Arabic)
Baghdad	Bagdade (E), Bagdá (B)	Baġdād
Basra	Baçorá	Baṣrah
Mosul	Mossul	Mawsil

== Ireland ==
Ireland Irlanda
English name	Portuguese name	Endonym (Irish)
Dublin	Dublim	Baile Átha Cliath

== Israel and Palestine ==
Israel Israel e Palestine Palestina
English name	Portuguese name	Endonym	
English name	Portuguese name	Name	Language
Bethlehem	Belém	Beit-Léchem	Arabic & Hebrew
Galilee	Galileia	Ha-Galil	Hebrew
Jaffa	Jafa	Yafo-Tel Aviv	Hebrew
Jerusalem	Jerusalém	Yerushaláim, al-Quds	Hebrew, Arabic
Nazareth	Nazaré	Notzéret	Hebrew
Tel Aviv	Telavive	Tel Aviv	Hebrew

== Italy ==
Italy Itália
English name	Portuguese name	Endonym	
English name	Portuguese name	Name	Language
Arezzo	Arécio		
Assisí	Assis		
Baragiano	Barajão (E)		
Calabria	Calábria		
Cagliari	Cálhari (E)		
Campania	Campânia	Campagna	Tuscan
Florence	Florença	Firenze	Tuscan
Genoa	Génova (E), Gênova (B)	Genova	Genoese
Latium	Lácio	Lazio	Italian
Liguria	Ligúria		
Mantua	Mântua		
Milan	Milão	Milano	Lombardy
Naples	Nápoles	Nàpoli	Sicilian-Neapolitan
Padua	Pádua		
Piacenza	Plasência (E)		
Piedmont	Piemonte	Piemonte	Lombardy
Sardinia	Sardenha		
Sicily	Sicília	Sicilia	Sicilian
Tiber	Tibre	Tebro	Romano
Turin	Turim	Torino	Piemontese
Venice	Veneza	Venizia	Véneto
Vesuvius	Vesúvio	Vesuvio	Neapolitan

== Jamaica ==
Jamaica Jamaica
English name	Portuguese name		
English name	Portuguese name	Port Royal	Porto Real

== Japan ==
Japan Japão
English name	Portuguese name	Endonym (Japanese)
Kyoto	Quioto	Kyōto
Nagasaki	Nagasáqui	Nagasaki
Tokyo	Tóquio	Tōkyō-to

== Kenya ==
Kenya Quénia (E), Quênia (B)
English name	Portuguese name		
English name	Portuguese name	Nairobi	Nairóbi
Mombasa	Mombaça, Mombassa		

== Latvia ==
Latvia Letónia (E), Letônia (B)
English name	Portuguese name	Endonym (Latvian)
Courland	Curlândia (E)	Kurzeme
Latgallia	Lat(e)gália (E), Let(e)gália (E)	Latgale
Semigallia	Semigália (E), Semigola (E)	Zemgale

== Lebanon ==
Lebanon Líbano
English name	Portuguese name	Endonym (Arabic)	Notes
Beirut	Beirute	Bayrūt	
Sidon	Sídon, Sidom	Saydā	Tzidon (Phoenician)

== Lithuania ==
Lithuania Lituânia
English name	Portuguese name	Endonym (Lithuanian)
Klaipėda	Memel(burgo) (E)	
Samogitia	Samogícia	
Vilnius	Vilna	Vilna

== Luxembourg ==
Luxembourg Luxemburgo
English name	Portuguese name		
English name	Portuguese name	Luxembourg	Luxemburgo

== Malaysia ==
Malaysia Malásia
English name	Portuguese name		
English name	Portuguese name	Johor	Jor
Kuala Lumpur	Cuala Lumpur, Quala Lumpur, Cualalumpur		
Penang	Penão, Pinão		

== Mali ==
Mali Mali, Máli
English name	Portuguese name		
English name	Portuguese name	Bamako	Bamaco
Djenné	Jené		
Timbuktu	Tombuctu		

== Mexico ==
Mexico México
English name	Portuguese name	Endonym	
English name	Portuguese name	Name	Language
Baja California	Baixa Califórnia	Baja California	Spanish
Baja California Sur	Baixa Califórnia do Sul	Baja California Sur	Spanish
Chihuahua	Chiuaua	Chihuahua	Tohono
Mexico City	Cidade do México	Ciudad de México	Spanish
Yucatan	Iucatão (E), Iucatã (B)	Yucatán	

== Moldova ==
Moldova Molávia, Moldova
English name	Portuguese name		
English name	Portuguese name	Chişinău	Quichineve

== Morocco ==
Morocco Marrocos
English name	Portuguese name		
English name	Portuguese name	Agadir	Santa Cruz do Cabo de Gué (E)
Casablanca	Casa Branca (E), Casabranca (E)		
Draa	Drá		
El Jadida	Mazagão		
Kasba Tadla	Tédula		
Marrakesh	Marraquexe		
Meknes	Meknès, Mequinez		
Ouarzazate	Uarzazate		
Rabat	Rebate		
Sous	Sus, Suz		
Tafilalt	Tafilal(e)t, Tafilete		
Tangier	Tânger		

== Myanmar ==
Myanmar Myanmar, Mianmar, Miamar
English name	Portuguese name	Endonym (Burmese)
Rangoon	Rangum	Yangon

== Nepal ==
Nepal Nepal
English name	Portuguese name		
English name	Portuguese name	Kathmandu	Catmandu

== Netherlands ==
Netherlands Países Baixos
English name	Portuguese name	Endonym	
English name	Portuguese name	Name	Language
Amsterdam	Amesterdão (E), Amsterdã (B)		
Frisia	Frísia	Friesland, Fryslân	Dutch, Frisian
Groningen	Groninga (E)		
Holland	Holanda		
Leiden	Leida (E)		
Limburg	Limburgo		
Meuse	Mosa (E)		
Nijmegen	Nimega (E)		
Rhine	Reno		
Rotterdam	Roterdão (E), Roterdã (B)		
The Hague	Haia		
Tilburg	Tilburgo		
Utrecht	Utreque (E)		
Zeeland	Zelândia		

== North Korea ==
North Korea Coreia do Norte
English name	Portuguese name		
English name	Portuguese name	Pyongyang	Pionguiangue

== North Macedonia ==
North Macedonia Macedónia do Norte (E), Macedônia do Norte (B)
English name	Portuguese name		
English name	Portuguese name	Skopje	Escópia

== Pakistan ==
Pakistan Paquistão
English name	Portuguese name		
English name	Portuguese name	Hyderabad	Hiderabade
Islamabad	Islamabade		
Karachi	Carachi, Caráchi		
Kashmir	Caxemira		

== Panama ==
Panama Panamá
English name	Portuguese name	Endonym (Spanish)
Panama City	Cidade do Panamá	Ciudad de Panamá

== Paraguay ==
Paraguay Paraguai
English name	Portuguese name	Endonym (Guaraní)
Asunción	Assunção	Paraguay
Ciudad del Este	Cidade do Leste	Táva Kuarahyresẽme

== Poland ==
Poland Polónia (E), Polônia (B)
English name	Portuguese name	Endonym	
English name	Portuguese name	Name	Language
Bydgoszcz	Bidoges		
Gdańsk	Danges		
Cracow	Cracóvia	Kraków	Polish
Lublin	Lublim (E)		
Mazovia	Mazóvia	Mazowsze	Polish
Mazuria	Mazúria	Mazury	Polish
Olsztyn	Ouxetim		
Pomerania	Pomerânia	Pomorze	Polish
Szczecin	Estetino		
Silesia	Silésia	Ślōnsk	Silesian
Warsaw	Varsóvia	Warszawa	Polish
Wrocław	Breslau (E), Breslávia (E), Vratislávia (E)		

== Romania ==
Romania Romênia
English name	Portuguese name	Endonym (Romanian)
Banat	Banato	
Bessarabia	Bessarábia	Basarab
Bucharest	Bucareste	
Constanţa	Constança	
Transylvania	Transilvânia	
Wallachia	Valáquia	

== Russia ==
Russia Rússia
English name	Portuguese name	Endonym	
English name	Portuguese name	Name	Language
Adygea	Adiguésia, Adigeia		
Arkhangelsk	Arcangel		
Bashkortostan	Bascortostão		
Chechnya	(T)che(t)chénia (E), (T)che(t)chênia (B)		
Dagestan	Daguestão		
Ingushetia	Inguchétia		
Kabardino-Balkaria	Cabárdia-Balcária		
Kaliningrad	Kaliningrado		
Kalmykia	Calmúquia		
Karachay-Cherkessia	Carachai-Circássia		
Karelia	Carélia		
Kazan	Cazã		
Moldovia	Mordóvia		
Moscow	Moscovo (E), Moscou (B)	Moskva	Russian
Orenburg	Oremburgo		
Ossetia	Ossétia		
Saint Petersburg	São Petersburgo, Sampetersburgo	Sankt Peterburg	Dutch
Siberia	Sibéria		
Tatarstan	Tataristão		
Udmurtia	Udmúrtia		
Volgograd	Volgogrado		
Yekaterinburg	Ecaterimburgo		

== Saudi Arabia ==
Saudi Arabia Arábia Saudita
English name	Portuguese name	Endonym (Arabic)
Jeddah	Gidá, Jidá	Jiddah
Mecca	Meca	al-Maqqa
Riyadh	Riade	

== Serbia ==
Serbia Sérvia
English name	Portuguese name	Endonym (Serbian)
Belgrad	Belgrado	Beograd
Banat	Banato	
Danube	Danúbio	Dunav
Novi Beograd	Nova Belgrado	
Smederevo	Semêndria	

== Singapore ==
Singapore Singapura, Cingapura
English name	Portuguese name	Endonym (Malay, Mandarin, Tamil)	Notes
Singapore	Singapura, Cingapura	Singapura, Xīnjiāpō, Chiṅkappūr	The spelling "Cingapura" is still widely used despite being officially discontinued in 1943.

== Slovenia ==
Slovenia Eslovénia (E)/ Eslovênia (B)
English name	Portuguese name		
English name	Portuguese name	Koper	Capodístria
Maribor	Marburgo		

== South Africa ==
South Africa África do Sul
English name	Portuguese name	Endonym
Bloemfontein	Blumefontaina	ǀʼAuxa ǃXās, Mangaung
Cape Town	Cidade do Cabo	Kaapstad, iKapa
Johannesburg	Joanesburgo	eGoli
Pretoria	Pretória	ePitoli
Port Elizabeth	Porto Elizabeth	Gqeberha, Die Baai, iBhayi

== South Korea ==
South Korea Coreia do Sul
English name	Portuguese name	Endonym	
English name	Portuguese name	Name	Language
Seoul	Seul	Sǝ-ūl	Hangukmal (Korean)

== Spain ==
Spain Espanha
English name	Portuguese name	Endonym		Notes
English name	Portuguese name	Name	Language	Notes
Andalusia	Andaluzia	Andalucía	Castilian (Spanish)	
Aragon	Aragão	Aragón, Aragó	Spanish, Aragonese	
Asturias	Astúrias	Asturias	Astur-Leonese	
Badajoz	Badalhouce	Badajoz	Castilian	Historical, Obsolete
Balearic Islands	Ilhas Baleares	Islas Baleares, Illes Balears	Castilian, Catalan-Balearic	
Basque Country	País Basco	Euskal Herria	Basque	
Bilbao	Bilbau (E)	Bilbo	Basque	
Biscay	Biscaia	Vizcaya	Castilian (Spanish)	
Cadiz	Cádis (E)	Cádiz	Castilian (Spanish)	
Canary Islands	Ilhas Canárias	Islas Canarias	Spanish	
Cantabria	Cantábria	Cantabria	Spanish	
Castile	Castela	Castilla	Castilian	
Catalonia	Catalunha	Cataluña, Catalunya	Spanish, Catalan	
Ciudad Rodrigo	Cidade Rodrigo	Ciudad Rodrigo	Spanish	
Cordova	Córdova	Córdoba	Castilian (Spanish)	
Corunna	a Corunha	La Coruña, A Coruña	Spanish, Galician	
Galicia	Galiza, Galícia (B)	Galícia	Galician	
Grand Canary	Grã-Canária, Grande Canária	Gran Canaria	Castilian (Spanish)	
Guadalajara	Guadalaxara (E?)	Guadalajara	Castilian (Spanish)	
Jaén	Xaém (E)	Jaén	Castilian (Spanish)	
The Mancha	A Mancha	La Mancha	Castilian (Spanish)	
León	Leão	León		
Logroño	Logronho	Logroño	Castilian (Spanish)	
Madrid	Madrid (E) Madri (B)	Madrid	Castilian (Spanish)	
Majorca	Maiorca	Mallorca	Catalán mallorquí	
Melilla	Melilha	Melilla	Castilian (Spanish)	
Minorca	Minorca	Menorca	Catalán mallorquí	
Murcia	Múrcia	Murcia	Castilian (Spanish)	
Olivenza	Olivença			
Orense	Ourense			
Palencia	Palência/Palença	Palencia	Castilian (Spanish)	
the Pyrenees	Pirenéus/Pirinéus (E), Pireneus (B)	los Pireneos	Spanish	
San Sebastián	São Sebastião (E)	Donostiara	Basque	
Seville	Sevilha	Sevilla	Castilian (Spanish)	
Sierra Nevada	Serra Nevada	Sierra Nevada	Castilian (Spanish)	
Valencia	Valência	València	Valencià-Català	
Valladolid	Valhadolide (E)	Valladolid	Castilian (Spanish)	
Zamora	Samora	Zamora	Castilian (Spanish)	
Saragossa	Saragoça	Zaragoza	Spanish	

== Sudan ==
Sudan Sudão
English name	Portuguese name	Endonym (Arabic)
Khartoum	Cartum	Kharṭūm

== Sweden ==
Sweden Suécia
English name	Portuguese name	Endonym (Swedish)
Gotland	Gotlândia	
Gothenburg	Gotemburgo	Göteborg
Helsingborg	Helsimburgo	
Lappland	Lapónia (E), Lapônia (B)	
Scania	Escânia	Skåne
Stockholm	Estocolmo	

== Switzerland ==
Switzerland Suíça
English name	Portuguese name	Endonym	
English name	Portuguese name	Name	Language
Basel	Basileia		
Bern	Berna		
Fribourg	Friburgo		
Geneva	Genebra	Genève	French
Lausanne	Lausana (E)		
Lucerne	Lucerna	Luzern	German
Solothurn	Soleura		
Zürich	Zurique		

== Syria ==
Syria Síria
English name	Portuguese name	Endonym (Arabic)
Damascus	Damasco	Dimashq, Shām

== Tanzania ==
Tanzania Tanzânia, Tanzania
English name	Portuguese name	Endonym (Arabic)	Notes
Arusha	Aruxa		
Dar es Salaam	Dar es-Salã	Dar as-Salaam	Land of Peace

== Thailand ==
Thailand Tailândia
English name	Portuguese name		
English name	Portuguese name	Bangkok	Banguecoque (E), Bancoque (B)

== Turkey ==
Turkey Turquia
English name	Portuguese name		
English name	Portuguese name	Istanbul	Istambul
İzmir	Esmirna		

== Uganda ==
Uganda Uganda
English name	Portuguese name		
English name	Portuguese name	Kampala	Campala

== Ukraine ==
Ukraine Ucrânia
English name	Portuguese name		
English name	Portuguese name	Kyiv	Quieve (B)
Zaporizhzhia	Zaporíjia		

== United Kingdom ==
United Kingdom Reino Unido
English name (also endonym)	Portuguese name
Ascension	Ascensão
Bamburgh	Bamburgo
Cambridge	Cambrígia, Cantabrígia
Canterbury	Cantuária (E)
Channel Islands	Ilhas do Canal (da Mancha)
Cornwall	Cornualha
Edinburgh	Edimburgo
Edinburgh of the Seven Seas	Edimburgo dos Sete Mares
England	Inglaterra
English Channel	Canal da Mancha
Falkland Islands	Ilhas Malvinas, Ilhas Falkland
Glasgow	Glásgua
Hebrides	Hébridas
Jersey	Jérsia (E), Jérsei
Lancaster	Lencastre
London	Londres
Newport	Novo Porto
Orkney	Órcadas, Órcades
Oxford	Oxónia (E), Oxônia (B)
Plymouth	Plimude
Saint Helena	Santa Helena
Scotland	Escócia
Tristan da Cunha	Tristão da Cunha
Thames	Tamisa (E), Tâmisa (B)
Wales	(País de) Gales
York	Iorque (E)

== United States ==
United States Estados Unidos
English name	Portuguese name	Endonym	
English name	Portuguese name	Name	Language
Alaska	Alasca		
California	Califórnia		
Disneyland	Disneylândia		
Florida	Flórida, Florida		
Georgia	Geórgia		
Guam	Guã, Guame		
Hawaii	Havai (E), Havaí (B)	Hawai'i	Hawaiian
Indianapolis	Indianápolis		
Louisiana	Luisiana		
Minneapolis	Mineápolis		
New England	Nova Inglaterra		
New Hampshire	Nova Hampshire, Novo Hampshire		
New Jersey	Nova Jérsia (E), Nova Jérsei (B)		
New Mexico	Novo México		
New Orleans	Nova Orleães (E), Nova Orleans (B)		
New York	Nova York, Nova Iorque		
North Carolina	Carolina do Norte		
North Dakota	Dacota do Norte, Dakota do Norte		
Northern Mariana Islands	Ilhas Marianas Setentrionais, Ilhas Marianas do Norte		
Oregon	Óregon		
Pennsylvania	Pensilvânia		
Philadelphia	Filadélfia		
Puerto Rico	Porto Rico		
San Diego	São Diego		
San Francisco	São Francisco		
South Carolina	Carolina do Sul		
South Dakota	Dacota do Sul, Dakota do Sul		
Vermont	Vermonte		
Virginia	Virgínia		
West Virginia	Virgínia Ocidental		

== Uruguay ==
Uruguay Uruguai
English name	Portuguese name		
English name	Portuguese name	Colonia del Sacramento	Colónia do Sacramento (E), Colônia do Sacramento (B)
Montevideo	Montevideu (E), Montevidéu (B)		

== See also ==
- List of European exonyms
