= Umberg =

Umberg is a surname. Notable people with the surname include:

- Robin Umberg (born c. 1955), United States Army officer
- Tom Umberg (born 1955), American politician
