= Lithuanian exonyms =

This is a list of Lithuanian language exonyms for places outside the Republic of Lithuania.

== Albania ==
Albania
English name	Lithuanian name	Endonym		Notes
English name	Lithuanian name	Name	Language	Notes
Tirana	Tirana	Tiranë	Albanian	

== Austria ==
Austria
English name	Lithuanian name	Endonym		Notes
English name	Lithuanian name	Name	Language	Notes
Vienna	Viena	Wien	German	

== Belarus ==
Belarus Gudija
English name	Lithuanian name	Endonym		Notes
English name	Lithuanian name	Name	Language	Notes
Ašmiany	Ašmena			
Baranavičy	Baranovičiai			
Breslaw	Breslauja	Brasłaǔ		
Dzyatlava	Zietela			
Gervyaty	Gervėčiai			
Grodno	Gardinas	Hrodna		
Halshany	Alšėnai			
Iwye	Vija			
Lida	Lyda			
Navahrudak	Naugardukas			
Olšany	Alšėnai			
Pastavy	Pastoviai			
Smarhon	Smurgainys			
Vawkavysk	Valkaviskas			

== Belgium ==
Belgium
English name	Lithuanian name	Endonym		Notes
English name	Lithuanian name	Name	Language	Notes
Brussels	Briuselis	Brussel	Dutch	
Brussels	Briuselis	Bruxelles	French	

== Bulgaria ==
Bulgaria
English name	Lithuanian name	Endonym		Notes
English name	Lithuanian name	Name	Language	Notes
Burgas	Burgasas	Burgas (Бургас)	Bulgarian	
Dobrich	Dobričius	Dobrich (Добрич)	Bulgarian	
Plovdiv	Plovdivas	Plovdiv (Пловдив)	Bulgarian	
Sofia	Sofija	Sofiya (София)	Bulgarian	
Veliko Tarnovo	Veliko Tarnovas	Veliko Tŭrnovo (Велико Търново)	Bulgarian	
Vidin	Vidinas	Vidin (Видин)	Bulgarian	

== Denmark ==
Denmark
English name	Lithuanian name	Endonym		Notes
English name	Lithuanian name	Name	Language	Notes
Copenhagen	Kopenhaga	København	Danish	
Rønne	Rionė	Rønne	Danish	

== Estonia ==
Estonia
English name	Lithuanian name	Endonym		Notes
English name	Lithuanian name	Name	Language	Notes
Pärnu	Pernu			
Tallinn	Talinas			

== France ==
France
English name	Lithuanian name	Endonym		Notes
English name	Lithuanian name	Name	Language	Notes
Nice	Nica			
Paris	Paryžius			
Strasbourg	Strasbūras			

== Italy ==
Italy
English name	Lithuanian name	Endonym		Notes
English name	Lithuanian name	Name	Language	Notes
Florence	Florencija	Firenze	Italian	
Genoa	Genuja	Genova	Italian	
Mantua	Mantuja	Mantova	Italian	
Naples	Neapolis			
Padua	Paduja	Padova	Italian	
Pompei	Pompėja			
Sardinia	Sardinija			
Sicily	Sicilija			
Venice	Venecija	Venexia	Venetian	

== Latvia ==
Latvia
English name	Lithuanian name	Endonym		Notes
English name	Lithuanian name	Name	Language	Notes
Courland	Kuršas	Kurzeme	Latvian	
Daugavpils	Daugpilis	Daugavpils	Latvian	
Latgalia	Latgala	Latgale	Latvian	
Liepāja	Liepoja	Liepāja	Latvian	
Sēlija	Sėla	Sēlija	Latvian	
Semigalia	Žiemgala	Zemgale	Latvian	
Vidzeme	Vidžeme	Vidzeme	Latvian	

== Netherlands ==
Netherlands
English name	Lithuanian name	Endonym		Notes
English name	Lithuanian name	Name	Language	Notes
The Hague	Haga	Den Haag	Dutch	

== Moldova ==
Moldova
English name	Lithuanian name	Endonym		Notes
English name	Lithuanian name	Name	Language	Notes
Chișinău	Kišiniovas	Chișinău	Romanian	

== Poland ==
Poland
English name	Lithuanian name	Endonym		Notes
English name	Lithuanian name	Name	Language	Notes
Augustów	Augustavas			
Barczewo	Vartėnai			
Barciany	Bartėnai			
Bartoszyce	Barštinas			
Braniewo	Prūsa			
Białystok	Balstogė			
Bisztynek	Vangėnai			
Częstochowa	Čenstakava			
Dąbrówno	Gilgė			
Dobre Miasto	Gudai			
Działdowo	Selduva			
Dzierzgoń	Kristapilė			
Elbląg	Elbingas			
Ełk	Elkas, Lukas			
Frombork	Baudai			
Giżycko	Lėcius			
Gołdap	Geldapė			
Górowo Iławeckie	Landžiai			
Iława	Eiluva			
Jedwabno	Gedvangiai			
Kętrzyn	Raistpilis			
Koło	Kolas			
Kraków	Krokuva			
Kwidzyn	Marienverderis			
Lidzbark Warmiński	Šventkalnis, Varmės Lidzbarkas			
Łyna	Alna			
Malbork	Marienburgas, Malborkas			
Mazuria	Mozūrai	Mazury		
Miłakowo	Levena			
Miłomłyn	Livmala			
Morąg	Maurungėnai			
Mrągowo	Senpilė			
Nidzica	Nida			
Olecko	Alėcka			
Olsztyn	Alenštainas, Alnštynas, Olštinas			
Orneta	Vormedytė			
Ostróda	Osterodė			
Pasłęk	Galindė			
Pasym	Paeismė			
Pieniężno	Malšiakukis			
Prabuty	Rasonė			
Przezmark	Prūsų Marka			
Puńsk	Punskas			
Reszel	Rėšlius			
Rogajny	Ragainiai			
Sejny	Seinai			
Sorkwity	Sarginytė			
Susz	Rasapilis			
Suwałki	Suvalkai			
Szczytno	Sedonė			
Tolkmicko	Tulkimyčiai			
Warsaw	Varšuva	Warszawa		
Wȩgorzewo	Ungura			

== Portugal ==
Portugal
English name	Lithuanian name	Endonym		Notes
English name	Lithuanian name	Name	Language	Notes
Lisbon	Lisabona	Lisboa	Portuguese	

== Romania ==
Romania
English name	Lithuanian name	Endonym		Notes
English name	Lithuanian name	Name	Language	Notes
Bucharest	Bukareštas	București	Romanian	

== Russia ==
Most of these places are in Kaliningrad Oblast; which is nearly the same area as Lithuania Minor.

Russia
English name	Lithuanian name	Endonym		Notes
English name	Lithuanian name	Name	Language	Notes
Bagrationovsk	Eiluva, Ilava, Iluva, Prūsų, Ylava, Yluva			
Baltiysk	Piliava			
Bolshakovo	Didieji Skaisgirai			
Chekhovo	Udravangis			
Cheryakhovsk	Įsrutis			
Chernyshevskoye	Eitkūnai			
Chistye Prudy	Tolminkiemis			
Demyanovka	Angelava			
Domnovo	Dumnava			
Druzhba	Alenburgas, Alna			
Fevralskoye	Kirsnakiemis			
Grachovka	Kramava			
Gromovo	Lauknos			
Gusev	Gumbinė			
Gvardeysk	Tepliava, Tepliuva			
Gvardeyskoye	Miulhauzenas			
Kaliningrad	Karaliaučius			
Kalinino	Mielkiemis			
Khrabrovo	Pavadenė			
Kornevo	Cintai, Žintai			
Krasnolesye	Raminta, Rominta			
Krasnoznamensk	Lazdėnai, Lazdynai			
Krylovo	Ašvėnai, Nordenburgas			
Kutuzovo	Širvinta			
Ladushkin	Liudvigsortas			
Lesnoy	Šarkuva			
Lotnoye	Tenkyčiai			
Mamonovo	Šventapilė, Šventpilis			
Marino	Arnava			
Mayakovskoye	Nemirkiemis			
Mayovka	Jurbarkas, Spargė			
Mezhdurechye	Narkyčiai			
Morskoye	Pilkopa			
Muromskoye	Labata, Labota, Labutė, Laptava			
Neman	Ragainė			
Nesterov	Stalupėnai			
Nevskoye	Pilupėnai			
Ozersk	Darkiemis			
Pionersky	Kuršiai			
Polessk	Labguva			
Porechye	Alnava			
Primorsk	Žuvininkai			
Progres	Auktalitas, Auktalytė			
Ruskoye	Girmava			
Rybachy	Rasytė			
Slavsk	Gastos			
Sovetsk	Tilžė			
Svetlogorsk	Rūsiai			
Svetly	Cimerbūdė			
Talpaki	Toplaukiai			
Uskakovo	Pokarviai			
Vesoloye	Balga			
Yantarny	Palmininkai, Palvininkai			
Yasnaya Polyana	Trakėnai			
Zarechye	Kaimas, Kaimiai, Kilgis, Prieglius			
Zelenogradsk	Krantas			
Zheleznodorozhny	Girdava			
Znamensk	Vėliava, Vėluva			

== Serbia ==
Serbia
English name	Lithuanian name	Endonym		Notes
English name	Lithuanian name	Name	Language	Notes
Belgrade	Belgradas	Beograd	Serbian	

== Spain ==
Spain
English name	Lithuanian name	Endonym		Notes
English name	Lithuanian name	Name	Language	Notes
Girona	Žirona			

== Switzerland ==
Switzerland
English name	Lithuanian name	Endonym		Notes
English name	Lithuanian name	Name	Language	Notes
Zürich	Ciūrichas			

== See also ==
- List of European exonyms
- Names of Belarusian places in other languages
