= Slovak exonyms =

List of Slovak exonyms

This is a list of Slovak language exonyms for towns, villages, and countries in non-Slovak-speaking areas of the World.

Caveat: some of them are only used in historical contexts today (not always marked in the list). A complete list of names that are obligatorily translated into their Slovak equivalents covers the Slovak Standardization of Geographic Nomenclature maintained by the Geodesy, Cartography and Cadastre Authority of the Slovak Republic.

== Albania ==
- Durrës Drač
- Korçë Korča (rare)
- Lezhë Leža
- Tirana Tirana
- Shkodër Skadar
- Vlorë Valona (rare)

== Algeria ==
- Al-Jaza'ir Alžír

== Austria ==
- Angern an der March Congr (local)
- Bruck an der Leitha Most nad Litavou (hist.)
- Dürnkrut Suchá Kruta (local)
- Graz Štajerský Hradec (also Graz)
- Hohenau Cahnov (local)
- Kärnten Korutánsko
- Kittsee (hist.) Kopčany
- Klagenfurt (hist.) Celovec
- Krems (hist.) Kremža
- Linz Linec
- Neusiedl am See Nezider
- Neusiedlersee Neziderské jazero
- Österreich Rakúsko
- Salzburg (hist. ) Soľnohrad
- Villach (hist.) Belák
- Wien Viedeň
- Wiener Neudorf Viedenská Nová Ves
- Wiener Neustadt Viedenské Nové Mesto

== Belgium ==
- Antwerpen Antverpy
- Brugge Bruggy
- Brussel-Bruxelles Brusel
- Liège Lutych

== Bulgaria ==
- Pleven Plevno

== China ==
- Běijīng Peking
- Zhōngguó Čína

== Croatia ==
- Dubrovnik Dubrovník (hist.: Ragúza)
- Istra Istria
- Karlovac Karlovec
- Zagreb Záhreb

== Cyprus ==
- Lefkosia Nikózia

== Denmark ==
- Danmark Dánsko
- København Kodaň

== France ==
- Avignon Aviňon
- Crécy-en-Ponthieu Kresčak
- Lourdes Lurdy
- Metz Mety
- Paris Paríž
- Reims Remeš
- Strasbourg Štrasburg

== Germany ==
- Aachen Cáchy (also Aachen)
- Bautzen Budyšín
- Bayern Bavorsko
- Berlin Berlín
- Bremen Brémy
- Cottbus Chotebuz
- Chemnitz Saská Kamenica (rare)
- Dresden Drážďany
- Deutschland Nemecko
- Frankfurt am Main Frankfurt nad Mohanom
- Görlitz Zhorelec
- Köln Kolín nad Rýnom
- Konstanz Kostnica
- Leipzig Lipsko
- Lübeck Ľubica (hist.)
- Mainz Mohuč (rare)
- München Mníchov
- Nürnberg Norimberg
- Passau Pasov
- Plauen Plavno (rare)
- Potsdam Postupim
- Regensburg Rezno (rare)
- Rügen Rujana
- Spree Spréva
- Stuttgart Štutgart
- Trier Trevír
- Tübingen Tubinky (hist.)
- Usedom Uznojem
- Zittau Žitava

== Greece ==
- Athina Atény
- Ελλάδα (Ellada) Grécko
- Ioannina Janina (hist.)
- Kérkyra Korfu
- Kriti Kréta
- Korinthos Korint
- Mykénés Mykény
- Peiraiás Pireus
- Sparti Sparta
- Thessaloniki Solún

== Hungary ==
- Balassagyarmat Balážske Ďarmoty
- Balaton Balatón, Blatenské jazero, Blatno (hist.) Bolotin
- Békéscsaba Békešská Čaba
- Bezenye Beziň
- Buda Budín
- Budapest Budapešť, Pešťbudín
- Csákvár Čakvár
- Csongrád Čongrad
- Csorna Čierna
- Debrecen Debrecín
- Drégely Drégeľ
- Dunaújváros Dunajské Nové Mesto
- Eger Jáger
- Esztergom Ostrihom, (hist.) Stregom
- Győr Ráb
- Kalocsa Kaloča
- Kaposvár Kapošvár
- Keszthely Blatenský Kostel
- Kisvárda Malý Varadín
- Komárom (Maď.) Komárno
- Kőszeg Kysek/Kysak
- Medgyesegyháza Medeš
- Miskolc Miškovec
- Mohács Moháč
- Moson Uhorské Staré Hrady, Mošon (hist.) Mošin a Starhrad
- Nagykanizsa (Veľká) Kaniža
- Nagymaros Veľký Maroč
- Nógrád Novohrad
- Pannonhalma (mesto) Rábsky Svätý Martin
- Pannonhalma Panónska Hora, (hist.) Panónsky chlm
- Pécs Päťkostolie
- Pilisszentkereszt Mlynky
- Pilisszántó Santov
- Salgótarján Šalgov-Tarjany
- Sárospatak Blatný Potok
- Siklós Šiklóš
- Sopron Šopron
- Szarvas Sarvaš
- Szécsény Sečany
- Szeged Segedín
- Székesfehérvár Stoličný Belehrad
- Szentendre Svätý Ondrej
- Szob Sobov
- Szolnok Solnok/Solník
- Szombathely Kamenec, Sobotné mesto (hist.) Sabaria
- Tihany Tichoň
- Tótkomlós Slovenský Komlóš, (hist.) Slovenský Chmeľov
- Vác Vacov
- Vasvár Vašvár, Železný hrad
- Veszprém Vesprém, (hist.) Vesprím
- Visegrád Vyšehrad
- Zalavár Blatnohrad (hist.)

== India ==
- Bangalore Bangalúr
- Kolkata Kalkata
- Mumbai Bombaj
- New Delhi Naí Dillí
- Varanasi Benáres

== Iran ==
- Tehran Teherán

== Israel & Palestinian Territories ==
- Ariha Jericho
- Keysaria Cézarea
- Lod Lida or Lydda (hist.)
- Natzrat Nazaret
- Tverya Tiberiada
- Yafo Jaffa (hist. Jopa)
- Yerushala'im / Al-Kuds Jeruzalem

== Italy ==
- Firenze Florencia
- Genova Janov
- Gorizia Gorica
- Italy Taliansko
- Milano Miláno
- Napoli Neapol
- Padova Pádua
- Roma Rím
- Siracusa Syrakúzy
- Taranto Tarent
- Torino Turín
- Trento Trident
- Trieste Terst
- Venezia Benátky

== Kazakhstan ==
- Almaty Alma-Ata
- Aktobe Akťubinsk

== Latvia ==
- Daugavpils Dvinsk
- Latvija Lotyšsko
- Liepāja Libava (hist.)

== Lebanon ==
- Sūr Týros or Týrus

== Lithuania ==
- Vilnius Vilno (hist.)
- Kaunas Kovno (hist.)

== Moldova ==
- Chişinău Kišiňov
- Tighina Bendery

== Monaco ==
- Monaco Monako

== Mongolia ==
- Ulaanbaatar Ulanbátar

== Netherlands ==
- Den Haag Haag
- Groningen (hist.) Groninky
- Nederlands Holandsko, (hist.) Nizozemsko

== Poland ==
- Białogard Belehrad
- Bydgoszcz Bydhošť
- Częstochowa Čenstochová
- Katowice Katovice
- Kraków Krakov
- Nowy Targ Nový Targ / Nový Trh
- Oświęcim Osvienčim
- Ruda Śląska Sliezska Ruda
- Szczecin Štetín
- Szczecinek Nový Štetín
- Tarnów Tarnov
- Tarnowskie Góry Tarnovice
- Warszawa Varšava
- Wieliczka Vielička
- Wrocław Vroclav (hist. Vratislav)
- Zgorzelec Zhorelec

== Portugal ==
- Lisboa Lisabon

== Romania ==
- Bistrița Bystrica (hist.)
- București Bukurešť
- Cluj-Napoca Kluž
- Constanța Konstanca
- Galați Galac
- Iași Jasy
- Nădlac Nadlak
- Oradea (hist.) Veľký Varadín
- Pitești Pitešť
- Ploiești Ploješť
- Rodna Rudnava (hist.)
- Satu Mare Satmár
- Sibiu Sibiň (rare)
- Sighetu Marmației Sihoť, Marmarošská Sihoť
- Sighișoara Segešvár
- Șiria (hist.) Világoš
- Târgoviște Trhovište
- Timișoara Temešvár
- Transilvania Sedmohradsko

== Russia ==
- Chelyabinsk Čeľabinsk
- Chita Čita
- Kaliningrad Kaliningrad, Kráľovec (hist. to 1945)
- Kazan Kazaň
- Novokuznetsk Novokuzneck
- Sankt-Peterburg Petrohrad, Sankt Peterburg
- Yekaterinburg Jekaterinburg

== Saudi Arabia ==
- Mecca Mekka

== Serbia ==
- Beograd Belehrad
- Novi Sad Nový Sad
- Bački Petrovac Báčsky Petrovec

== South Africa ==
- Cape Town-Kaapstad Kapské mesto

== Sweden ==
- Stockholm Štokholm

== Switzerland ==
- Basel Bazilej
- Genève Ženeva

== Turkey ==
- Edirne (hist.) Drinopol
- İstanbul Istanbul (hist. Carihrad, Konštantínopol)
- İzmir (hist.) Smyrna
- Silivri Selimbria (hist.)
- Trabzon Trapezunt (hist.)
- Truva / Troia Trója

== Ukraine ==
- Berehove Berehovo
- Chernivtsi Černovice
- Chornobyl Černobyľ
- Kharkiv Charkov
- Kyiv Kyjev
- Lviv Ľvov
- Mukachevo Mukačevo
- Rakhiv Rachov
- Rivne Rovno
- Ternopil Tarnopoľ
- Zaporizhzhia Záporožie

== United Kingdom ==
- London Londýn
- United Kingdom Spojené kráľovstvo, (vern.) Anglicko

== Vietnam ==
- Thành phố Hồ Chí Minh Hočiminovo mesto

== See also ==
- List of European exonyms
