= Albanian exonyms =

Many places have exonyms, names for places that differs from that used in the official or well-established language within that place, in the Albanian language.

Albanian has a relatively small number of true exonyms in areas beyond the current borders of Albania and Kosovo, mostly in neighboring countries, and those are listed here.

In addition, Albanian is a language with phonetic spelling that includes orthographic exonymy, i.e. it renders the names of non-Albanian places and people phonetically according to Albanian orthography. For example, Manchester is written as Mançester, Los Angeles as Los Anxheles, and New York as Nju Jork, etc. These are not listed here.

== Grammatical forms of Albanian placenames ==
True Albanian exonyms, not mere orthographic exonyms, like all Albanian placenames can be rendered in two forms the same way as common nouns, the definite and indefinite forms. These forms are created with postpositions to the placename.

When using English or another foreign language, Albanians tend to use the definite form but on road signs and other similar usage, the indefinite form is used because there is an implied preposition në, meaning "to" or "in", which is followed by the indefinite. Maps, especially those produced in Albania, consistently use the indefinite form.

The two forms are applied differently depending on grammatical gender of the word. "Recommended international usage for Albanian toponyms" in Kosovo has feminine place names appearing in the definite form and masculine place names in the indefinite form. However, in Albania, English usage is of the indefinite for both feminine and masculine placenames except for the capital, Tirana. Masculine nouns usually take the suffix -i and feminine ones the suffix -a (which overrides a final -ë).

== Austria ==
Austria Austria
English name	Albanian name	Endonym		Notes
English name	Albanian name	Name	Language	Notes
Vienna	Vjenë	Wien	German	

== Azerbaijan ==
Azerbaijan Azerbajxhan
English name	Albanian name	Endonym		Notes
English name	Albanian name	Name	Language	Notes
Baku	Baku	Bakı	Azeri	

== Belgium ==
Belgium Belgjika
English name	Albanian name	Endonym		Notes
English name	Albanian name	Name	Language	Notes
Brussels	Bruksel	Brussel	Dutch	
Brussels	Bruksel	Bruxelles	French	

== Bosnia and Herzegovina ==
Bosnia and Herzegovina Bosnja dhe Hercegovina
English name	Albanian name	Endonym		Notes
English name	Albanian name	Name	Language	Notes
Brčko	Bërçka	Brčko	Bosnian	
Sarajevo	Sarajevë	Sarajevo	Bosnian	

== Bulgaria ==
Bulgaria Bullgaria
English name	Albanian name	Endonym		Notes
English name	Albanian name	Name	Language	Notes
Plovdiv	Pl(l)ovdiv, Filipopojë	Plovdiv	Bulgarian	
Sofia	Sofje	Sofija	Bulgarian	

== China ==
China Kinë
English name	Albanian name	Endonym		Notes
English name	Albanian name	Name	Language	Notes
Beijing	Pekin	Běijīng	Mandarin	

== Croatia ==
Croatia Kroacia
English name	Albanian name	Endonym		Notes
English name	Albanian name	Name	Language	Notes
Arbanasi	Arbanëshi	Arbanasi	Croatian	
Šibenik	Shibeniku	Šibenik	Croatian	
Zadar	Zara	Zadar	Croatian	
Dubrovnik	Rush	Dubrovnik	Croatian	historical; no longer in use

== Cyprus ==
Cyprus Qipro
English name	Albanian name	Endonym		Notes
English name	Albanian name	Name	Language	Notes
Nicosia	Nikozia	Lefkoşa	Turkish	
Nicosia	Nikozia	Lefkosía	Greek	

== Czechia ==
Czechia Çekia
English name	Albanian name	Endonym		Notes
English name	Albanian name	Name	Language	Notes
Prague	Pragë	Praha	Czech	

== Denmark ==
Denmark Danimarka
English name	Albanian name	Endonym		Notes
English name	Albanian name	Name	Language	Notes
Copenhagen	Kopenhagen, Kopenhagë	København	Danish	

== Egypt ==
Egypt Egjipti
English name	Albanian name	Endonym		Notes
English name	Albanian name	Name	Language	Notes
Cairo	Kajro	Qāhirah	Arabic	

== Greece ==
Greece Greqia
English name	Albanian name	Endonym		Notes
English name	Albanian name	Name	Language	Notes
Aetomilitsa	Denckë	Aetomilítsa	Greek	
Ammoudia	Spllancë	Ammúdia	Greek	
Anthousa	Rrapezë	Anthúsa	Greek	
Argos Orestiko	Hurupisht, Rupisht	Árgos Orestikó	Greek	
Arta	Artë, Nartë	Arta	Greek	
Bizani	Bezhan	Bizáni		
Corfu	Korfuz, Qarfoz	Kérkyra		
Delvinaki	Delvinaq	Delvináki		
Drosopigi	Bellkamen	Drosopigí		
Edessa	Vodenë	Édessa		
Elassona	Allasonjë	Elassóna		
Fanari	Frar	Fanári		
Filiates	Filat	Filiátes		
Flampouro	Negovan	Flámpouro		
Florina	Follorinë	Flórina		
Grevena	Grebené	Grevená		
Goumenissa	Gumenicë	Guménissa		
Igoumenitsa	Gumenicë	Igumenítsa		
Ioannina	Janinë	Ioánnina		
Kalabaka	Kallabakë	Kalabáka		
Kalamata	Kallamatë	Kalamáta		
Kastoria	Kostur	Kastoriá		
Kastrion	Kastricë	Kastríon		
Katavothra	Luarat	Katavóthra		
Kavala	Kavallë	Kavála		
Lekhovon	Lehovë	Lékhovon		
Livadeia	Livadhja	Livadeiá		
Margariti	Margëllëç, Margëlliç	Margaríti		
Messolonghi	Mesolongji, Meslonjë	Messolongí		
Metsovo	Mecovë, Meçovë	Métsovo		
Narkissos	Arcë	Narkíssos		
Othoni	Thonuz	Othoní		
Paramithia	Paramithi	Paramithiá		
Parapotamos	Varfanj	Parapótamos		
Patras	Patër	Pátra		
Peloponnese	Moré, Peloponez	Pelopónnisos		
Perdika	Arpicë	Perdika		
Plataria	Pllotarë	Platariá		
Pogoniani	Voshtinë	Pogonianí		
Ptolemaida	Kajlar	Ptolemaïda		
Sagiada	Sajadhë	Sagiáda		
Stavroupoli	Kristopojë	Stavrúpoli		
Syvota	Volë	Sývota		
Themelon	Taban	Themélon		
Thesprotikon	Lelovë	Thesprotikón		
Thessaloniki	Selanik	Thessalonikí		
Trikala	Tërkallë, Trikallë	Tríkala		
Tripoli	Tripolicë	Tripolí		
Vuvousa	Vuvucë	Vuvúsa		

== Israel ==
Israel Izraeli
English name	Albanian name	Endonym		Notes
English name	Albanian name	Name	Language	Notes
Jerusalem	Jeruzalem	Al Quds	Arabic	
Jerusalem	Jeruzalem	Yerushalayim (ירושליים)	Hebrew	
Nazareth	Nazaret	Naseriyye	Arabic	
Nazareth	Nazaret	Natzrat (נצרת)	Hebrew	

== Italy ==
Italy Italia
English name	Albanian name	Endonym		Notes
English name	Albanian name	Name	Language	Notes
Acquaformosa	Firmoza			
Barile	Barilli			
Campomarino	Kemarini			
Caraffa di Catanzaro	Garfara			
Casavecchia di Puglia	Kazallveqi			
Castroregio	Kasternexhi			
Cavallerizzo	Cajaverizzi			
Cerzeto	Qana			
Chieuti	Qefti			
Civita	Cifti			
Falconara Albanese	Fallkunara			
Firmo	Ferma			
Frascineto	Frasnitha			
Genoa	Gjenovë	Genova	Italian	
Lungro	Ungra			
Macchia Albanese	Maqi			
Maschito	Mashqiti			
Mezzioiuso	Munxifsi			
Mongrassano	Mongrasana			
Montecilfone	Munxhfune			
Palazzo Adriano	Palaci			
Pallagorio	Puherio			
Piana dei Greci	Hora e Arbëreshëvet			
Plataci	Pllatani			
Portocannone	Portokanuni			
San Basile	Shën Vasili			
San Benedetto Ullano	Shën Benedhiti			
San Cosmo Albanese	Strighari			
San Constantino Albanese	Shën Kostadini			
San Demetrio Corone	Shën Mitri			
San Giacomo di Cerzetu	Shën Japku			
San Giorgio di Albanese	Mbuzati			
San Martino di San Finita	Shën Murtiri			
San Marzano di San Giuseppe	Shën Marcani			
San Nicola dell'Alto	Shën Kolli			
San Paolo Albanese	Shën Pali			
Santa Catarina Albanese	Picilia			
Santa Cristina Gela	Sendahstina			
Santa Sofia d'Epiro	Shën Sofia			
Spezzano Albanese	Spixano			
Trieste	Trieshtë			
Ururi	Ruri			
Vaccarizzo Albanese	Vakarici			
Vena di Maide	Vina			
Venice	Venedik	Venexia	Venetian	
Villa Badessa	Badhessa			

== Jordan ==
Jordan Jordania
English name	Albanian name	Endonym		Notes
English name	Albanian name	Name	Language	Notes
Amman	Amani	Ammān	Arabic	

== Lebanon ==
Lebanon Libani
English name	Albanian name	Endonym		Notes
English name	Albanian name	Name	Language	Notes
Tripoli	Tripoli	Tarābulus	Arabic	

== Libya ==
Libya Libia
English name	Albanian name	Endonym		Notes
English name	Albanian name	Name	Language	Notes
Tripoli	Tripoli	Tarābulus	Arabic	

== Mongolia ==
Mongolia Mongolia
English name	Albanian name	Endonym		Notes
English name	Albanian name	Name	Language	Notes
Ulanbaataar	Ulan Bator	Ulanbaataar	Mongolian	

== Montenegro ==
Montenegro Mali i Zi
English name	Albanian name	Endonym		Notes
English name	Albanian name	Name	Language	Notes
Bar	Tivar	Bar	Montenegrin	
Bijelo Polje	Bellopojë	Bijelo Polje	Montenegrin	
Budva	Buduë	Budva	Montenegrin	
Cetinje	Cetinë	Cetinje	Montenegrin	
Gusinja	Guci, Gusi	Gusinja	Montenegrin	
Kolašin	Koloshin	Kolašin	Montenegrin	
Nikšić	Nikshiq	Nikšić	Montenegrin	
Plav	Plavë	Plav	Montenegrin	
Pljevlje	Plevlë	Pljevlje	Montenegrin	
Podgorica	Podogoricë; Anamal, Burguriçë	Podgorica	Montenegrin	
Ulcinj	Ulqin	Ulcinj	Montenegrin	
Žabljak	Zhabjak	Žabljak	Montenegrin	

== Nepal ==
Nepal Nepali
English name	Albanian name	Endonym		Notes
English name	Albanian name	Name	Language	Notes
Kathmandu	Katmandu	Kantipur	Nepali	

== Netherlands ==
Netherlands Holanda
English name	Albanian name	Endonym		Notes
English name	Albanian name	Name	Language	Notes
The Hague	Hagë	Den Haag	Dutch	

== North Macedonia ==
North Macedonia Maqedonia e Veriut
English name	Albanian name	Endonym		Notes
English name	Albanian name	Name	Language	Notes
Bitola	Manastir	Bitola	Macedonian	
Dibra	Dibër	Debar	Macedonian	
Gevgelia	Gjevgjeli	Gevgelja	Macedonian	
Kicevo	Uskanë	Kičevo	Macedonian	
Kocani	Koçan	Kočani	Macedonian	
Kratovo	Arvanjë	Kratovo	Macedonian	
Krusevo	Arbinesh	Kruševo	Macedonian	
Ohrid	Ohër, Ohri	Ohrid	Macedonian	
Prilep	Përlep	Prilep	Macedonian	
Radovis	Radovisht	Radoviš	Macedonian	
Resen	Resnjë	Resen	Macedonian	
Sar Mountains	Bjeshkët e Sharrit, Malet e Sharrit, Mali i Sharrit	Šar Mountains	Macedonian	
Skopje	Shkup	Skopje	Macedonian	
Sveti Nikole	Arbanas	Sveti Nikole	Macedonian	
Valandovo	Vallandovë	Valandovo	Macedonian	
Zajas	Zajaz	Zajas	Macedonian	

== Oman ==
Oman Omani
English name	Albanian name	Endonym		Notes
English name	Albanian name	Name	Language	Notes
Muskat	Muskat	Masqaṭ	Arabic	

== Russia ==
Russia Rusia
English name	Albanian name	Endonym		Notes
English name	Albanian name	Name	Language	Notes
Moscow	Moskë	Moskva	Russian	
Saint Petersburg	Shën-Pjetërburgu	Sankt-Peterburg	Russian	

== Saudi Arabia ==
Saudi Arabia Arabia Saudite
English name	Albanian name	Endonym		Notes
English name	Albanian name	Name	Language	Notes
Medina	Medina	Madīna	Arabic	
Mecca	Meka	Makkah	Arabic	

== Serbia ==
Serbia Serbia
English name	Albanian name	Endonym		Notes
English name	Albanian name	Name	Language	Notes
Blace	Bllacë	Blace	Serbian	
Bujanovac	Bujanoc	Bujanovac	Serbian	
Kuršumlija	Kurshumli	Kuršumlija	Serbian	
Leskovac	Leskoc	Leskovac	Serbian	Also known in Albanian as Leshkuq
Medveđa	Medvegjë	Medveđa	Serbian	
Novi Pazar	Pazar i Ri, Treg i Ri	Novi Pazar	Serbian	
Prokuplje	Përkuple	Prokuplje	Serbian	
Sjenica	Senicë	Sjenica	Serbian	
Vlasotince	Vllasotincë	Vlasotince	Serbian	
Vranje	Vrajë	Vranje	Serbian	

== Somalia ==
Somalia Somalia
English name	Albanian name	Endonym		Notes
English name	Albanian name	Name	Language	Notes
Mogadishu	Mogadishu	Muqdisho	Somali	

== Switzerland ==
Switzerland Zvicra
English name	Albanian name	Endonym		Notes
English name	Albanian name	Name	Language	Notes
Geneva	Gjenevë	Genèvre	French	
Geneva	Gjenevë	Genf	German	

== Turkey ==
Turkey Turqia
English name	Albanian name	Endonym		Notes
English name	Albanian name	Name	Language	Notes
Edirne	Edërne, Adrianopojë	Edirne	Turkish	
İstanbul	Stamboll, Konstantinopojë	İstanbul	Turkish	

== Ukraine ==
Ukraine Ukrainë
English name	Albanian name	Endonym		Notes
English name	Albanian name	Name	Language	Notes
Kyiv	Kiev	Kyiv	Ukrainian	

== United Kingdom ==
United Kingdom Mbretëria e Bashkuar
English name	Albanian name	Endonym		Notes
English name	Albanian name	Name	Language	Notes
Cardiff	Kardif	Caerdydd	Welsh	
Edinburgh	Edinburg	Dún Èideann	Scottish Gaelic	
Edinburgh	Edinburg	Edinburgh	Scots, English	
London	Londër	London	English	

== Uzbekistan ==
Uzbekistan Uzbekistani
English name	Albanian name	Endonym		Notes
English name	Albanian name	Name	Language	Notes
Tashkent	Tashkent	Toshkent	Uzbek	

== See also ==
- List of European exonyms
