= Norwegian exonyms =

As a general rule, modern Norwegian does not use exonyms for names with endonyms in Latin script. Historically, several Danish/German exonyms have been in use, due to the Danish roots of the Bokmål variety of Norwegian, but these exonyms should be considered archaic, and are no longer used officially.

== Albania ==
Albania
English name	Norwegian name	Endonym		Notes
English name	Norwegian name	Name	Language	Notes
Tirana	Tirana	Tiranë	Albanian	

== Austria ==
Austria Østerrike
English name	Norwegian name	Endonym		Notes
English name	Norwegian name	Name	Language	Notes
Tyrol	Tirol, Tyrol	Tirol	German	Tirol is recommended, but the form Tyrol is resistant because the name of the musical Sommer i Tyrol and the word tyrolerhatt

== Belgium ==
Belgium Belgia
English name	Norwegian name	Endonym		Notes
English name	Norwegian name	Name	Language	Notes
Brussels	Brussel	Brussel	Dutch	Norwegian uses the German name, though less prominent, German is an official language of Belgium.
Brussels	Brussel	Bruxelles	French	

== Cuba ==
Cuba
English name	Norwegian name	Endonym		Notes
English name	Norwegian name	Name	Language	Notes
Havana	Havanna	La Habana	Spanish	

== Denmark ==
Places in Denmark are in Norway spelled like in Danish. Also, for places with Aa, which during the latter half of the 20th century were spelled Å in Denmark, and then changed back to aa. Thus, Aabenraa and some more places are spelled with aa also in Norway. The same sound is spelled Å for places in Norway.

== Estonia ==
Estonia
English name	Norwegian name	Endonym		Notes
English name	Norwegian name	Name	Language	Notes
Tallinn	Reval, Tallinn	Tallinn	Estonian	Reval is a dated term for Tallinn.

== Finland ==
Until recently, most people tended to use the official Swedish names in Norwegian. The Swedish names are not exonyms, since both Finnish and Swedish are official languages in Finland, with many towns, cities and regions having two, often very different, official names. In recent years, however, the use of Finnish place names have gained some popularity in Norwegian.

== Germany ==
Germany Tyskland
English name	Norwegian name	Endonym		Notes
English name	Norwegian name	Name	Language	Notes
Rhine	Rhinen	Rhein	German	
Stralsund	Stræla	Stralsund	German	

== Greece ==
Greece Hellas
English name	Norwegian name	Endonym		Notes
English name	Norwegian name	Name	Language	Notes
Athens	At(h)en	Athína	Greek	
Corfu	Korfu	Kérkyra	Greek	
Corinth	Korint(h)	Korinthos	Greek	
Crete	Kreta	Kriti	Greek	
Pireus	Pireus	Peiraias	Greek	
Rhodes	Rhodos	Rodhos	Greek	

== Italy ==
Italy Italia
English name	Norwegian name	Endonym		Notes
English name	Norwegian name	Name	Language	Notes
Syracuse	Syrakus	Siracusa	Italian	
Sardinia	Sardinia	Sardegna	Italian	

== Netherlands ==
Netherlands Nederland
English name	Norwegian name	Endonym		Notes
English name	Norwegian name	Name	Language	Notes
The Hague	Haag	Den Haag	Dutch	

== Russia ==
Russia Russland
English name	Norwegian name	Endonym		Notes
English name	Norwegian name	Name	Language	Notes
Saint Petersburg	St. Petersburg	Sankt Peterburg	Russian	

== Sweden ==
Newspapers in Norway often, but absolutely not always, write all ä as æ (sometimes e) and all ö as ø, probably because ä and ö were historically lacking on Norwegian typewriters. For example: Göteborg (Gothenburg) is in Norway written Göteborg or Gøteborg.
Some places have genuine Norwegian names because they were originally part of Norway:

Sweden Sverige
English name	Norwegian name	Endonym		Notes
English name	Norwegian name	Name	Language	Notes
Bohuslän	Båhuslen	Bohuslän	Swedish	
Härjedalen	Herjedalen, Herjådalen	Härjedalen	Swedish	
Jämtland	Jemtland	Jämtland	Swedish	

== United Kingdom ==
United Kingdom Storbritannia (og Nord-Irland)
English name	Norwegian name	Endonym		Notes
English name	Norwegian name	Name	Language	Notes
Scotland	Skottland	Alba	Scottish Gaelic	
Thames	Themsen	Thames	English	

== See also ==
- List of European exonyms
