= Dutch exonyms =

Below is list of Dutch language exonyms for places in non-Dutch-speaking areas.

== Albania ==
Albania Albanië
English name	Dutch name	Endonym		Notes
English name	Dutch name	Name	Language	Notes
Albanian Alps/Accursed Mountains	Albanese Alpen	Bjeshkët e Nemuna; Alpet Shqiptare	Albanian	
Cape of Gjuhëz	Kaap Glossa	Kepi i Gjuhëzës	Albanian	
Ceraunian Mountains	Keraunisch Gebergte	Malet e Vetëtimës	Albanian	

== Argentina ==
Argentina Argentinië
English name	Dutch name	Endonym		Notes
English name	Dutch name	Name	Language	Notes
Cape Virgenes	Maagdenkaap	Cabo Vírgenes	Spanish	Historically attested exonym
Isla de los Estados	Stateneiland	Isla de los Estados	Spanish	
Tierra del Fuego	Vuurland	Tierra del Fuego	Spanish	

== Australia ==
Australia Australië
English name	Dutch name	Endonym		Notes
English name	Dutch name	Name	Language	Notes
New Holland	Nieuw-Holland	New Holland	English	Historical colonial name of Australia as a colonial nation
New South Wales	Nieuw Zuid-Wales; Nieuw-Zuid-Wales; Nieuw-Zuid-Wallis	New South Wales	English	Historically attested exonyms

== Austria ==
Austria
English name	Dutch name	Endonym		Notes
English name	Dutch name	Name	Language	Notes
Carinthia	Karinthië	Kärnten; Karntn	German; Bavarian	
Lower Austria	Neder-Oostenrijk	Niederösterreich; Niedaöstareich	German; Bavarian	
Styria	Stiermarken	Steiermark; Steiamårk	German; Bavarian	
Upper Austria	Opper-Oostenrijk	Oberösterreich; Obaösterreich	German; Bavarian	
Vienna	Wenen	Wien; Wean	German; Bavarian	
Vienna Woods	Weense Woud	Wienerwald; Weanawoid	German; Bavarian	

== Belgium ==
Belgium België
English name	Dutch name	Endonym		Notes
English name	Dutch name	Name	Language	Notes
Amougies	Amengijs			
Archennes	Eerken			
Argenteau	Erkenteel, Erkentiel			
Arlon	Aarlen			
Arquennes	Arkene			
Bassenge	Bitsingen			
Bassilly	Zullik			
Bastogne	Bastenaken			
Bas-Warneton	Neerwaasten			
Beauvechain	Bevekom			
Beclers	Beek-Laren			
Belœil	Belle			
Bergliers	Belliek			
Berneau	Berne, Bernouw			
Bettincourt	Bettenhoven			
Bierges	Bierk			
Bierghes	Bierk			
Bois-de-Lessines	Lessenbos			
Boirs	Beurs			
Bombaye	Bolbeek			
Bossut-Gottechain	Bossuit-Gruttekom			
Braine-l'Alleud	Eigenbrakel			
Braine-le-Château	Kasteelbrakel			
Braine-le-Comte	's Gravenbrakel			
Brussels	Brussel			
Clermont	Klaerment			
Comines	Komen			
Corbais	Korbeek			
Corswarem	Korsworm			
Crisnée	Gerstenhoven			
Dottignies	Dottenijs			
Enghien	Edingen			
Escanaffles	Schalafie			
Estaimbourg	Steenburg			
Estaimpuis	Steenput			
Évregnies	Evernijs			
Flobecq	Vloesberg			
Froyennes	Fraaihem			
Gembloux	Gembloers			
Genappe	Genepiën			
Ghislenghien	Gellingen			
Glabais	Glabbeek			
Glons	Glaaien			
Goé	Gulke			
Gondregnies	Gondergem			
Grandville	Nederliek			
Grez-Doiceau	Graven			
Hallembaye	Hallebeek			
Haut-Ittre	Hoog-Itter			
Henri-Chapelle	Hendrik-Kapelle			
Hermalle-sous-Argenteau	Hermal			
Herseaux	Herzeeuw			
Heure-le-Romain	Romaans-Heur			
Houtaing	Houtem			
Houtain-le-Val	Dalhoutem			
Houtain-Saint-Siméon	Houtem			
Jalhay	Gelhaag			
Jauche	Geten			
Jauchelette	Klein-Geten			
Jodoigne	Geldenaken			
Jodogine-Souveraine	Opgeldenaken			
Jurbise	Jurbeke			
La Clouse	Kluis			
La Hulpe	Terhulpen			
Lanaye	Ternaaien			
Lathuy	Laatwijk			
Lessines	Lessen			
Liège	Luik			
Soignies	Zinnik			
Lincent	Lijsem			
Linsmeau	Linsmaal			
Lixhe	Lieze			
Luingne	Lowingen			
Marbais	Marbeek			
Mélin	Malen			
Molenbaix	Molenbeek			
Mons	Bergen			
Mont-Saint-André	Sint-Andriesberg			
Namur	Namen			
Nivelles	Nijvel			
Nodebais	Nodebeek			
Noduwez	Nodevoorde			
Odeur	Elderen			
Œudeghien	Heidegem			
Ogy	Oseke			
Oisquercq	Oostkerk			
Oleye	Liek			
Ollignies	Woelingen			
Opprebais	Opperbeek			
Orbais	Oorbeek			
Oreye	Oerle			
Orp-le-Grand	Groot-Adorp			
Othée	Elch			
Otrange	Wouteringen			
Paifve	Peen			
Papignies	Papegem			
Pellaines	Pellen			
Perwez	Perwijs			
Petit Enghien	Lettelingen			
Piétrain	Petrem			
Piétrebais	Neerbeek			
Plombières	Bleiberg			
Racour	Raatshoven			
Rebecq-Rognon	Roosbeek			
Roclenge-sur-Geer	Rukkelingen-aan-de-Jeker			
Rosières	Rozieren			
Rosoux-Crenwick	Roost-Krenwik			
Russeignies	Rozenaken			
Saintes	Sint-Genildis			
Silly	Opzullik			
Soignies	Zinnik, Zoningen			
Thuin	Thuden			
Tournai	Doornik			
Tourinnes-la-Grosse	Deurne			
Trognée	Truielingen			
Tubize	Tubeke			
Val-Dieu	Godsdal			
Vieux-Genappe	Oud-Genepiën			
Visé	Wezet			
Waimes	Weismes			
Waremme	Borgworm			
Warneton	Waasten			
Warcoing	Warkonje			
Warsage	Weerst			
Wauthier-Braine	Woutersbrakel			
Wihogne	Nudorp			
Zétrud-Lumay	Zittert-Lummen			

== Canada ==
Canada Canada
English name	Dutch name	Endonym		Notes
English name	Dutch name	Name	Language	Notes
Nova Scotia	Nieuw-Schotland	Nova Scotia	English	Obsolete

== Chile ==
Chile Chili
English name	Dutch name	Endonym		Notes
English name	Dutch name	Name	Language	Notes
Easter Island	Paaseiland	Isla de Pascua	Spanish	
Tierra del Fuego	Vuurland	Tierra del Fuego	Spanish	

== Czechia ==
Czechia Tsjechië
English name	Dutch name	Endonym		Notes
English name	Dutch name	Name	Language	Notes
Bohemia	Bohemen	Čechy	Czech	
Karlovy Vary	Karlsbad	Karlovy Vary	Czech	
Mariánske Lázně	Mariënbad	Mariánske Lázně	Czech	
Moravia	Moravië	Morava	Czech	
Plzeň	Pilsen	Plzeň	Czech	
Prague	Praag	Praha	Czech	
Vltava	Moldau	Vltava	Czech	

== Denmark ==
Denmark Denemarken
English name	Dutch name	Endonym		Notes
English name	Dutch name	Name	Language	Notes
Copenhagen	Kopenhagen	København	Danish	
Funen	Funen	Fyn	Danish	
Jammerbugt	Jammerbocht	Jammerbugt	Danish	
Jutland	Jutland	Jylland	Danish	
Øresund	Sont	Øresund	Danish	
Wadden Sea	Waddenzee	Vadehavet	Danish	
Zealand	Seeland	Sjælland	Danish	

== Egypt ==
Egypt Egypte
English name	Dutch name	Endonym		Notes
English name	Dutch name	Name	Language	Notes
Alexandria	Alexandrië	Al-Iskandariyya	Standard Arabic	
Cairo	Caïro	Al-Qāhirah	Standard Arabic	

== Finland ==
Finland Finland
English name	Dutch name	Endonym		Notes
English name	Dutch name	Name	Language	Notes
Helsinki	Elsenfors	Helsinki	Finnish	Obsolete

== France ==
France Frankrijk
English name	Dutch name	Endonym		Notes
English name	Dutch name	Name	Language	Notes
Acquin-Westbécourt	Akkin-Westboekhout			
Affringues	Hafferdingen			
Arras	Atrecht			
Bailleul	Belle			
Bécourt	Beukhout			
Bergues	Sint Winoksbergen			Mainly Flemish
Berquin	Berkijk			
Boulogne-sur-mer	Bonen			
Bourthes	Boorten			
Bray-Dunes	Bray Duinen			
Burgundy	Bourgondië	Bourgogne	French	
Caëster	Kaaster			
Calais	Kales			Mainly Flemish
Cambrai	Kamerijk			Mainly Flemish
Cappelle-la-Grande	Grootkappel			
Comines	Komen			
Coudekerke-Branche	Nieuw Koudekerke			
Coudekerke-Village	Koudekerke			
Croix-du-Bac	Kruis van Bac			
Douai	Dowaai			Mainly Flemish
Drincham	Drinkam			
Dunkirk	Duinkerke(n)	Dunkerque	French	
Dunkirk	Duinkerke(n)	Duunkerke	West Flemish	
Ecques	Eske			
Escalles	Skale			
Escobecques	Schobeke			
Estairs	Stegers			
Étaples	Stapel			
Faucquembergues	Valkenberg			
Flêtres	Vleteren			
Fort-Philippe	Filipsfort			
Frelinghien	Verlegem			
Gravelines	Gravelingen			
Halluin	Halewijn			
Hameau-des-Neiges	Sneeuw Hamlet			
Haubourdin	Harbodem			
Hesdin	Heusden			
Journy	Jorneke			
La Belle-Vue	Mooi-Zicht			
Le Crotoy	Krotooie	Ch'Crotoé/L'Crotoé	Picard	
La Motte-au-Bois	De Walle			
Le Sprey	De Spreuk			
Le Touque	Het Hoekske			
Lille	Rijsel			
Loon-Plage	Loon			
Malo-les-Bains	Malo			
Merville	Meregem			
Montreuil	Monsterole, Monsterhole			
Nielles-lès-Bléquin	Nieles			
Nieppe	Niepkerke			
Nordausques	Noord-Elseke			
Normandy	Normandië			
Ostove	Oosthove			
Pihem	Pittem, Putheem			
Pont-d'Asquin	Askuin Brug			
Pont-de-Spyker	Spijkerbrugge			
Pont-L'Ablesse	Zwakte Brug			
Paris	Parijs			
Renescure	Ruisscheure			
Rosendaël	Rozendaal			
Roubaix	Robaais, Robeke			Mainly Flemish
Schoubrouck	Schouwbroek			
Sec-Bois	Droogbos			
Sercus	Zerkel			
Strasbourg	Straatsburg			
Synthe	Sinten			
Thiennes	Tienen			
Vieux-Hesdin	Oud-Heusden			
Wissant	Witzand			

== Germany ==
Germany Duitsland
English name	Dutch name	Endonym		Notes
English name	Dutch name	Name	Language	Notes
Bad Bentheim	Bentem			Dated
Bavaria	Beieren	Bayern		
Berlin	Berlijn			
Braunschweig	Brunswijk, Brunswick			Dated
Brilon	Breylen, Brijlen			
Cologne	Keulen	Köln		
Düsseldorf	Dusseldorp			Dated
Emlichhein	Emmelkamp			Dated
Emmerich	Emmerik			Dated
Fehmarn	Femeren			
Frankfurt	Frankfort			Dated
Geilenkirchen	Geelkerken			Dated
Geldern	Gelderen, Gelre			Both dated
Greetsiel	Grietjezijl			
Greifswalde	Grijpswolde			
Grevenbroich	Grevenbroek			
Hamelin	Hamelen	Hameln		
Herzogenrath	's-Hertogenrade			
Jemgum	Jemmingen			
Jülich	Gulik			Dated
Kaldenkirchen	Kaldenkerken, Koudenkerken			
Kettwig	Ketwijk			
Kleve	Kleef			
Kniphausen	Kniphuizen			
Magdeburg	Maagdenburg			
Nuremberg	Neurenberg	Nürnberg		
Neuenhaus	Nieuwenhuis			Dated
Osnabrück	Osnabrugge			Dated
Palatinate	Palts	Pfalz		
Pomerania	Pommeren	Pommern		
Saarbrücken	Saarbruggen			Dated
Saxony	Saksen	Sachsen		
Schleswig	Sleeswijk			
Schwalm	Swalm			
Silesia	Silezië			
Speyer	Spiers			
Stettin Bay	Oderhaf			
Stralsund	Straalsond			
Suderwick	Zuiderwijk			
Swabia	Zwaben	Schwaben		
Tüddern	Tudderen			
Uelsen	Ulsen			Dated
Veldhausen	Veldhuizen			Dated
Westphalia	Westfalen	Westfalen		
Wurm	Worm			
Zweibrücken	Tweebruggen			

== Greece ==
Greece Griekenland
English name	Dutch name	Endonym		Notes
English name	Dutch name	Name	Language	
Athens	Athene	Athina	Greek	
Attica	Attika	Attiki	Greek	
Corfu	Korfoe	Kerkyra	Greek	
Corinth	Korinthe	Korinthos	Greek	
Crete	Kreta	Kriti	Greek	
Cyclades	Cycladen	Kykladhes	Greek	
Dodecanese	Dodekanesos	Dhodhekanisos	Greek	
Euboea	Euboea	Evvia	Greek	
Piraeus	Piraeus	Pireás	Greek	
Samothrace	Samothrake	Samothraki	Greek	
Thrace	Thracië	Thraki	Greek	

== Hungary ==
Hungary Hongarije
English name	Dutch name	Endonym		Notes
English name	Dutch name	Name	Language	Notes
Pécs	Vijfkerken	Pécs	Hungarian	

== Ireland ==
Ireland Ierland
English name	Dutch name	Endonym		Notes
English name	Dutch name	Name	Language	Notes
Bantry	Banterij	Beanntraí	Irish	Obsolete
Dublin	Doblijn	Baile Átha Cliath	Irish	Obsolete
Cork	Kurk	Corcaigh	Irish	Obsolete
Galway	Galwin	Gaillimh	Irish	Obsolete
Limerick	Limmerick	Luimneach	Irish	Obsolete
Waterford	Watervoort	Port Láirge	Irish	Obsolete

== Israel ==
Israel Israël
English name	Dutch name	Endonym		Notes
English name	Dutch name	Name	Language	Notes
Capernaum	Kafarnaüm	Kfar Nachum (כפר נחום)	Hebrew	
Galilee	Galilea	HaGalil (הגליל)	Hebrew	
Jerusalem	Jeruzalem	Yerushaláyim (ירושלים)	Hebrew	
Nazareth	Nazareth	Natzrat (נצרת)	Hebrew	

== Italy ==
Italy Italië
English name	Dutch name	Endonym		Notes
English name	Dutch name	Name	Language	Notes
Bolzano	Bozen	Bolzano		
Florence	Florence, Florentië	Firenze		Dutch name pronounced as an adaption of French
Genoa	Genua	Genova		
Marche	Marken	Marche		
Mantua	Mantua	Mantova		
Milan	Milaan	Milano		
Naples	Napels	Napoli		
Padua	Padua	Padova		
Rome	Rome	Roma		
Sardinia	Sardinië	Sardegna		
Taranto	Tarante	Taranto		
Tiber	Tiber	Tevere		
Trento	Trente	Trento		
Trieste	Triëst	Trieste		
Tuscany	Toscane	Toscana		
Turin	Turijn	Torino		
Venice	Venetië	Venezia		

== Lebanon ==
Lebanon Libanon
English name	Dutch name	Endonym		Notes
English name	Dutch name	Name	Language	Notes
Tyre	Tyrus	Ṣūr	Standard Arabic	

== Norway ==
Norway Noorwegen
English name	Dutch name	Endonym	Notes
Kristiansand	Christianzand	Kristiansand	Rare
Kristiansund	Christianstraat	Kristiansund	Rare
Svalbard	Spitsbergen	Svalbard	
Trondheim	Dronthem	Trondheim	Rare

== Poland ==
Poland Polen
English name	Dutch name	Endonym		Notes
English name	Dutch name	Name	Language	Notes
Bydgoszcz	Bromberg			Rare
Elbląg	Elbing			Rare
Gdańsk	Dantzig, Danswijk			All rare
Gorzów Śląski	Landsberg in Opper-Silezië			Rare
Gorzów Wielkopolski	Landsberg aan de Warthe			Rare
Kraków	Krakau	Kraków		
Malbork	Mariënburg			Rare
Opole	Oppeln			Rare
Pasłęk	Pruissisch Holland			Rare
Pomerania	Pommeren	Pomorze		
Poznań	Posen			Rare
Silesia	Silezië	Śląsk		
Słubice	Damvoorstad			Rare
Warsaw	Warschau	Warszawa		
Wrocław	Breslau			Dated
Zielona Góra	Groenberg			Rare

== Portugal ==
Portugal Portugal
English name	Dutch name	Endonym		Notes
English name	Dutch name	Name	Language	Notes
Azores	Azoren	Açores	Portuguese	
Lisbon	Lissabon	Lisboa	Portuguese	
Tagus	Taag	Tejo	Portuguese	

== Romania ==
Romania Roemenië
English name	Dutch name	Endonym		Notes
English name	Dutch name	Name	Language	Notes
Transylvania	Zevenburgen	Transilvania	Romanian	Rare

== Russia ==
Russia Rusland
English name	Dutch name	Endonym		Notes
English name	Dutch name	Name	Language	Notes
Arkhangelsk	Archangel, Sint-Michiel			
Baskhortostan	Basjkirostan			
Ivangorod	Johanstad			
Kabardino-Balkaria	Kabardië-Balkarië			
Kaliningrad	Koningsbergen			Archaic
Moscow	Moskou	Moskva	Russian	
Novaya Zemlya	Nova Zembla			
Tatarstan	Tatarije			

== Serbia ==
Serbia Servië
English name	Dutch name	Endonym		Notes
English name	Dutch name	Name	Language	Notes
Belgrade	Belgrado	Beograd	Serbian	

== Spain ==
Spain Spanje
English name	Dutch name	Endonym		Notes
English name	Dutch name	Name	Language	Notes
Asturias	Asturië	Asturias	Spanish	
Balearic Islands	Balearen	Illes Balears	Catalan	
Basque Country	Baskenland	Euskadi	Basque	
Canary Islands	Canarische Eilanden	Islas Canarias	Spanish	
Catalonia	Catalonië	Catalunya	Catalan	

== Sweden ==
Sweden Zweden
English name	Dutch name	Endonym		Notes
English name	Dutch name	Name	Language	Notes
Gothenburg	Gotenburg	Göteborg	Swedish	
Scania	Schonen	Skåne	Swedish	
Stockholm	Stokhom	Stockholm	Swedish	Obsolete

== Switzerland ==
Switzerland Zwitserland
English name	Dutch name	Endonym		Notes
English name	Dutch name	Name	Language	Notes
Lake Geneva	Meer van Genève	Genfersee	German	
Lake Geneva	Meer van Genève	Lac Léman	French	
Lake Lucerne	Vierwoudstrekenmeer	Vierwaldstädttersee	German	

== Turkey ==
Turkey Turkije
English name	Dutch name	Endonym	Notes
Antakya	Antiochië	Antakya	
Bosporus	Bosporus	Boğaziçi, İstanbul Boğazı	
Cappadocia	Cappadocië	Kapadokya	
Cilicia	Cilicië	Kilikya	
Dardanelles	Dardanellen	Çanakkale Boğazı	
Edirne	Adrianopel	Edirne	
Gallipoli	Gallipoli	Gelibolu	
İzmir	Smyrna	İzmir	
İzmit	Nicomedia	İzmit	
İznik	Nicea	İznik	
Thrace	Thracië	Trakya	
Trabzon	Trebizonde	Trabzon	

== Ukraine ==
Ukraine Oekraïne
English name	Dutch name	Endonym		Notes
English name	Dutch name	Name	Language	Notes
Kharkiv	Charkov			
Kiev	Kiev	Kyiv		
Lviv	Lemberg			

== United Kingdom ==
United Kingdom Verenigd Koninkrijk
English name	Dutch name	Endonym		Notes
English name	Dutch name	Name	Language	Notes
Aberdeen	Ab(b)erdaan	Aiberdeen	Scots	Obsolete
Aberdeen	Ab(b)erdaan	Obar Dheathain	Scottish Gaelic	
Boston	Bolstoen	Boston	English	Obsolete
Canterbury	Kantelberg	Canterbury	English	Obsolete
Dartmouth	Dortmuiden	Dartmouth	English	Obsolete
Dover	Daveren	Dover	English	Obsolete
England	Engeland	England	English	
English Channel	Het Kanaal	English Channel	English	
English Channel	Het Kanaal	La Manche	French	
English Channel	Het Kanaal	Mor Bretannek	Cornish	
Falmouth	Vaalmuiden	Aberfala	Cornish	Obsolete
Hebrides	Hebriden	Innse Gall	Scottish Gaelic	
London	Londen	London	English	
Norwich	Noordwijk	Norwich	English	Obsolete
Orkney	Orkaden	Arcaibh	Scottish Gaelic	Obsolete
Oxford	Ossenvoorde	Oxford	English	Obsolete
Peterborough	Peterburg	Peterborough	English	Rare
Plymouth	Pleimuiden, Plijmuiden	Plymouth	English	Obsolete
Portsmouth	Portsmuiden	Portsmouth	English	Obsolete
Sandwich	Zandwijds	Sandwich	English	Obsolete
Scarborough	Scharenburg	Scarborough	English	Obsolete
Scotland	Schotland	Alba	Scottish Gaelic	
Scotland	Schotland	Scotland	English, Scots	
Shetland	Hitland	Sealtainn	Scottish Gaelic	Obsolete
Tynemouth	Tijnmuiden	Tynemouth	English	Obsolete
Wales	Wallis	Cymru	English	Obsolete
Yarmouth	Jarmuiden	Yarmouth	English	Obsolete

== United States ==
These Dutch-language place names were used during the Dutch colonial period and are now obsolete, and the Dutch spelling shown is in the modern Dutch spelling; at the time Dutch spelling varied.

United States Verenigde Staten
English name	Dutch name	Endonym		Notes
English name	Dutch name	Name	Language	Notes
Albany	Beverwijk			
Brooklyn	Breukelen			
Bushwick	Boswijk			
Connecticut River	Versche Rivier			
Delaware	Zwaanendael			
Delaware Bay	Godijns Bay			
Delaware River	Zuid Rivier, Lënapei Sipu			Lënapei Sipu is a form of the Lenape name
Flatbush	Vlacke Bos			
Flatlands	Nieuw Amersfoort			
Flushing	Vlissingen			
Greenwich	Groenwijk			
Hartford	Fort Huis de Goede Hoop			
Hudson River	Noort Rivier			
Jamaica	Rustdorp			
Kingston	Wiltwijk			
New Castle	Fort Casimir, Nieuw Amstel			
New York	Nieuw Amsterdam			
Rondout	Ronduit			
Wilmington	Fort Altena			Used from 1655 to 1664

== See also ==
- List of European exonyms
