= English exonyms =

An English exonym is a name in the English language for a place (a toponym), or occasionally other terms, which does not follow the local usage (the endonym). Endonyms and exonyms are features of all languages, and other languages may have their own exonym for English endonyms, for example Llundain is the Welsh exonym for the English endonym "London".

Romanization, or transcription of a non-Latin alphabet endonym into a Latin alphabet, is not generally regarded as creating exonyms: "The application of any scientifically sound romanization system to a non-Roman endonym merely re-creates that original endonym in another legitimate form" (Päll, 2002). However old romanization systems may leave a legacy of "familiar" spellings, as in the case of, for example, romanization of Burmese. This affects romanization of Arabic, romanization of Chinese, and many other non-Latin alphabet place names. Stripping diacritics of Latin alphabet names are also not regarded as exonyms.

Translations of non-proper nouns such as "river" and "lake" also do not qualify as exonyms.

A less common form of exonym is usage for names and titles. Personal exonyms are typically limited to regnal names such as popes (John Paul II) and monarchs (Charles V); less commonly, well-known historical authors (John Calvin, for French Jean Calvin) are referred to by exonyms. The list does not include the list of English translated personal names.

== General ==
This section lists English-language exonyms that are for places located in multiple countries, English names of countries, and typical patterns.

=== Countries and territories ===
The following is a list of countries and territories whose names in local languages differ from their (non-local) English ones. The list includes countries with limited recognition, autonomous territories of sovereign countries, and fully sovereign countries.

Country names are listed in their short form, and do not include names spelled identically in English. Near-identical names in pronunciation or spelling are included, but countries named with non-proper nouns (like Central African Republic or United Arab Emirates) are not. It is debatable whether the mere omission of a diacritical mark (as in several instances in the table below) creates an exonym.

The languages listed are official languages and/or prominent local languages, except if the name for the associated country is spelled the same as in English. Languages in italics are no longer spoken in the given country, but the name listed retains some use.

Likewise, exonyms in italics are obsolete or are disputed.

Countries and territories
English name	Endonym	Language
Albania	Shqipëri(a)	Standard Albanian
Albania	Shqipyni(a)	Gheg Albanian
Algeria	Al-Dzāyīr (الدزاير)	Maghrebi Arabic
Algeria	Al-Jazā'ir (الجزائر)	Standard Arabic
Armenia	Hayastan (Հայաստան)	Armenian
Austria	Österreich	Standard German
Belgium	België	Dutch
Belgium	Belgien	Standard German
Belgium	Belgique	French
Bhutan	Druk Yul (འབྲུག་ཡུལ་)	Dzongkha
Bosnia & Herzegovina	Bosna & Hercegovina (Босна & Херцеговина)	Bosnian
Brazil	Brasil	Portuguese
Bulgaria	Balgariya (България)	Bulgarian
Cambodia	Kampuciə (កម្ពុជា)	Khmer
China	Zhōngguó (中国)	Mandarin
Comoros	Comores	French
Comoros	Juzur Al-Qamar (جزر القمر)	Standard Arabic
Comoros	Komori	Comorian
Croatia	Hrvatska	Croatian
Cyprus	Kıbrıs	Turkish
Cyprus	Kýpros (Κύπρος)	Greek
Czech Republic, Czechia	Česká republika, Česko	Czech
Denmark	Danmark	Danish
Dominica	Dominique	French
Dominica	Wai'tu kubuli	Island Carib
Egypt	Maṣr (مَصر)	Egyptian Arabic
Egypt	Miṣr (مِصر)	Standard Arabic
Eritrea	Ertra (ኤርትራ)	Tigrinya
Eritrea	‘Iritriyā (إرتريا)	Standard Arabic
Estonia	Eesti	Estonian
Ethiopia	Itiyoophiyaa	Afar
Ethiopia	Itoobiya	Somali
Ethiopia	Itoophiyaa	Oromo
Ethiopia	ʾĪtyōṗṗyā (ኢትዮጵያ)	Amharic
Ethiopia	ʾĪtyōṗṗyā (ኢትዮጵያ)	Tigrinya
Finland	Suomi	Finnish
Georgia	Sakartvelo (საქართველო)	Georgian
Germany	Deutschland	Standard German
Greece	Elládha (Ελλάδα)	Greek
Hong Kong	Xiānggǎng	Chinese
Hungary	Magyarország	Hungarian
Iceland	Ísland	Icelandic
India	Bhaaratham (ഭാരതം)	Malayalam
India	Bhārat (भारत)	Marathi
India	Bhārat (भारत)	Dogri
India	Bhārat (भारत)	Hindi
India	Bhārat (भारत)	Maithili
India	Bhārat (भारत)	Nepali
India	Bhārat (ભારત)	Gujarati
India	Bhārat (بًارت \ भारत)	Kashmiri
India	Bhārat (بھارت \ ਭਾਰਤ)	Punjabi
India	Bhārat (ڀارت \ भारत)	Sindhi
India	Bhārat (بھارت)	Urdu
India	Bhārata (ಭಾರತ)	Kannada
India	Bhāratam (भारतम्)	Sanskrit
India	Bhārathadeśaṁ (భారతదేశం)	Telugu
India	Bhāratham (பாரதம்)	Tamil
India	Bharot (भारत)	Konkani
India	Bhārot (ভারত)	Bengali
India	Bhārôt (ভাৰত)	Assamese
India	Bhārôt (ভাৰত)	Meitei
India	Bhārôt (भारत)	Bodo
India	Bhārôtô (ଭାରତ)	Odia
India	Siñôt (ᱥᱤᱧᱚᱛ)	Santali
Italy	Italia	Standard Italian
Japan	Nihon / Nippon (日本)	Japanese
Jordan	Al-'Urdunn (الأردن)	Standard Arabic
Kazakhstan	Qazaqstan (Қазақстан)	Kazakh
Laos	Lāo (ລາວ)	Lao
Lebanon	Ləbnēn (لبنان)	Levantine Arabic
Lebanon	Lubnān (لبنان)	Standard Arabic
Libya	Lībiyā (ليبيا)	Standard Arabic
Lithuania	Lietuva	Lithuanian
Madagascar	Madagasikara	Malagasy
Maldives	Dhivehi Raajje (ދިވެހިރާއްޖެ )	Dhivehi
Mauritania	Agawej	Berber
Mauritania	Cengiṭ	Berber
Mauritania	Gànnaar	Wolof
Mauritania	Mauritanie	French
Mauritania	Moritani	Pulaar
Mauritania	Mūrītānyā (موريتانيا)	Standard Arabic
Mauritania	Murutaane	Soninke
Mauritius	Maurice	French
Mauritius	Moris	Mauritian Creole
Moldova	Moldaviya (Молдавия)	Russian
Monaco	Mónegue	Occitan
Monaco	Mùnegu	Ligurian
Mongolia	Mongol Uls (Монгол Улс)	Mongolian
Montenegro	Crna Gora (Црна Гора)	Montenegrin
Morocco	Al-Maġrib (المغرب)	Standard Arabic
Morocco	lmeɣrib (ⵍⵎⵖⵔⵉⴱ)	Standard Moroccan Tamazight
Morocco	Maroc	French
Mozambique	Moçambique	Portuguese
Mozambique	Msumbiji	Swahili
Mozambique	Mozambiki	Chewa
Mozambique	Muzambhiki	Tsonga
Myanmar	Myǎma (မြန်မာ)	Burmese
Nauru	Naoero	Nauruan
Netherlands	Nederland	Dutch
North Korea	Chosŏn (조선)	Korean
North Macedonia	Maqedonia e Veriut	Albanian
North Macedonia	Severna Makedonija (Северна Македонија)	Macedonian
Norway	Nöörja	Southern Sami
Norway	Noreg	Norwegian Nynorsk
Norway	Norga	Northern Sami
Norway	Norge	Norwegian Bokmål
Norway	Vuodna	Lule Sami
Oman	'Umān (عمان)	Standard Arabic
Palau	Belau	Palauan
Palau	Parao (パラオ)	Japanese
Palestine	Filasṭīn (فلسطين)	Standard Arabic
Philippines	Pilipinas	Tagalog
Poland	Polska	Polish
Russia	Rossíya (Росси́я)	Russian
Saudi Arabia	al-Suʿūdiyya (ٱلسُّعُودِيَّة)	Standard Arabic
Serbia	Srbija	Serbian
Singapore	Ciṅkappūr (சிங்கப்பூர்)	Tamil
Singapore	Singapura	Malay
Singapore	Xīnjiāpō (新加坡)	Mandarin
Slovakia	Slovensko	Slovak
South Korea	Hanguk (한국)	Korean
South Sudan	Paguot Thudän	Dinka
South Ossetia	Alaniya (Алания)	Russian
South Ossetia	Allonston (Аллонстон)	Ossetian
Spain	Espainia	Basque
Spain	España	Galician
Spain	España	Spanish
Spain	Espanha	Occitan
Spain	Espanya	Catalan
Sweden	Sverige	Swedish
Switzerland	Helvetia	Latin
Switzerland	Schweiz	Standard German
Switzerland	Suisse	French
Switzerland	Svizra	Romansh
Switzerland	Svizzera	Standard Italian
Syria	Sūriyā (سوريا)	Standard Arabic
Tajikistan	Tojikiston (Тоҷикистон)	Tajik
Thailand	Pratheṣ̄thịy (ประเทศไทย)	Thai
Transnistria	Nistrenia (Нистрения)	Romanian
Transnistria	Pridnestrovye (Приднестровье)	Russian
Transnistria	Prydnistrovya (Придністров'я)	Ukrainian
Tunisia	Tunest	Berber
Tunisia	Tunisie	French
Tunisia	Tūnis (تونس)	Standard Arabic
Turkey	Türkiye	Turkish
Ukraine	Ukrajina (Україна)	Ukrainian
Uzbekistan	Oʻzbekiston (Ўзбекистон)	Uzbek
Vatican City	Stato della Città del Vaticano	Standard Italian
Vatican City	Status Civitatis Vaticanae	Latin
Yemen	Al-Yaman (اَلْيَمَنُ)	Standard Arabic

=== Other territories ===
The following is a list of other territories/regions which are not deemed as countries or sovereign states.

Other territories
English name	Endonym	Language
Alsace	Elsass	German
Alsace	Elsàss	Alsatian
Basque Country	País Vasco	Spanish
Basque Country	Euskadi	Basque
Bavaria	Bayern	German
Bavaria	Boarn	Bavarian
Bohemia	Čechy	Czech
Bohemia	Böhmen	German
Brittany	Bretagne	French
Brittany	Breizh	Breton
Catalonia	Catalunya	Catalan
Catalonia	Cataluña	Spanish
Cornwall	Kernow	Cornish
Crimea	Krym (Крым)	Russian
Crimea	Krym (Крим)	Ukrainian
Crimea	Qırım	Crimean Tatar
Faroe Islands	Færøerne	Danish
Faroe Islands	Føroyar	Faroese
Flanders	Vlaanderen	Dutch
Friesland	Fryslân	Frisian
Galicia	Galiza	Galician
Greenland	Grønland	Danish
Greenland	Kalaallit Nunaat	Greenlandic
Kashubia	Kaszuby	Polish
Kashubia	Kaszëbë	Kashubian
Lombardy	Lombardia	Italian
Moravia	Morava	Czech
Moravia	Mähren	German
Piedmont	Piemonte	Italian
Piedmont	Piemont	Piedmontese
Pomerania	Pomorze	Polish
Pomerania	Pommern	German
Sicily	Sicilia	Italian
Sicily	Sicilia	Sicilian
Silesia	Śląsk	Polish
Silesia	Slezsko	Czech
Silesia	Ślōnsk	Silesian
Silesia	Schlesien	German
Tibet	Xīzàng (西藏)	Mandarin
Tibet	Böd (བོད)	Tibetan
Wales	Cymru	Welsh
Wallonia	Wallonie	French

== Specific countries ==
=== Albania ===
Albania Shqipëria
English name	Endonym		Notes
English name	Name	Language	Notes
Durazzo	Durrës	Albanian	Dated, Italian name
Tirana	Tiranë	Albanian	Tirana is Albanian for "the Tirana"

=== Algeria ===
Algeria Al-Jazā'ir (الجزائر)
English name	Endonym		Notes
English name	Name	Language	Notes
Algiers	Al-Jazā'ir (الجَزائر)	Standard Arabic	
Constantine	Qusanṭīnah (قسنطينة)	Standard Arabic	
Oran	Wahrān (وَهران)	Standard Arabic	

Name of the country and its capital city in Arabic, Al-Jazā'ir (الجزائر), is Arabic for "the islands".

=== Armenia ===
Armenia Hayastan (Հայաստան)
English name	Endonym		Notes
English name	Name	Language	Notes
Ararat Plain	Araratyan dasht (Արարատյան դաշտ)	Armenian	
Ararat Plain	Iğdır Ovası	Turkish	

=== Austria ===
Austria Österreich
English name	Endonym		Notes
English name	Name	Language	Notes
Ammergau Alps	Ammergebirge	German	
Bavarian Prealps	Bayerische Voralpen	German	
Carinthia	Kärnten	German	
Carpathian Basin	Karpatenbecken	German	
Danube river	Donau	German	
Drava	Drau	German	
Drave	Drau	German	Dated
Lake Constance	Bodensee	German	
Northern Limestone Alps	Nördliche Kalkalpen	German	
Southern Limestone Alps	Südliche Kalkalpen	German	
Styria	Steiermark	German	
Tyrol	Tirol	German	
Vienna	Wien	German	
Wetterstein	Wettersteingebirge	German	

=== Azerbaijan ===
Azerbaijan Azərbaycan
English name	Endonym		Notes
English name	Name	Language	Notes
Caucasus	Qafqaz	Azeri	
Sumgait	Sumqayıt	Azeri	

=== Belarus ===
Belarus Belarus (Беларус)
English name	Endonym		Notes
English name	Name	Language	Notes
Bielorussia, Byelorussia	Belarus	Belarusian	These exonyms were borrowed from Russian, not Belarusian; obsolete

=== Belgium ===
Historically, English borrowed French names for many places in Dutch-speaking areas of Belgium. With a few exceptions this practice is no longer followed by most sources.

Belgium België/ Belgique
English name	Endonym		Notes
English name	Name	Language	Notes
Antwerp	Antwerpen	Dutch	
Bruges	Brugge	Dutch	French name
Brussels	Brussel	Dutch	
Brussels	Bruxelles	French	
Courtrai	Kortrijk	Dutch	Archaic, French name
Filford	Vilvoorde	Dutch	Archaic
Flanders	Vlaanderen	Dutch	
Gaunt	Gent	Dutch	Archaic
Ghent	Gent	Dutch	
Louvain	Leuven	Dutch	Archaic, French name
Mechlin	Mechelen	Dutch	Archaic
Ostend	Oostende	Dutch	
Wallonia	Wallonie	French	
Ypres	Ieper	Dutch	French name

=== Bosnia & Herzegovina ===
Bosnia & Herzegovina Bosna & Hercegovina (Босна & Херцеговина)
English name	Endonym		Notes
English name	Name	Language	Notes
Bosnia	Bosna (Босна)	Bosnian	
Herzegovina	Hercegovina (Херцеговина)	Bosnian	German spelling, English name pronounced the same
Narenta	Neretva (Неретва)	Bosnian	Italian name, sometimes used in English

=== Bulgaria ===
Bulgaria Balgariya (България)
English name	Endonym		Notes
English name	Name	Language	Notes
Balkan Mountains	Stara Planina (Стара Планина)	Bulgarian	
Danube river	Dunav (Дунав)	Bulgarian	
Philippopolis	Plovdiv (Пловдив)	Bulgarian	Archaic
Rhodope Mountains	Rodopi (Родопи)	Bulgarian	
Southern Dobruja	Dobrudzha (Добруджа)	Bulgarian	Bulgarian half of former Dobruja region
Thrace	Trakiya (Тракия)	Bulgarian	

=== Canada ===
Numerous places in the predominantly French speaking province of Quebec have historically had English exonyms; in most cases, the English name was a straight translation of the place's French endonym, with only one major city which ever had an English exonym. With a few exceptions, such as Quebec City, these are no longer widely used. Exonyms are also commonly seen with regard to First Nations and Inuit peoples and communities; although government and media sources have evolved in recent years toward using these places' native endonyms, common usage may still favour the older exonyms.

Canada
English name	Endonym		Notes
English name	Name	Language	Notes
Arctic Red River	Tsiigehtchic	Gwich'in	Archaic
Big Trout Lake	Kitchenuhmaykoosib	Oji-Cree	
Cambridge Bay	Iqaluktuuttiaq	Inuinnaqtun	
Chesterfield Inlet	Igluligaarjuk (ᐃᒡᓗᓕᒑᕐᔪᒃ)	Inuktitut	
Fort Franklin	Délįnę	Sahtu	Archaic
Fort Hope	Eabametoong	Ojibwe	
Fort Norman	Tulita	Sahtu	Archaic
Fraserville	Rivière-du-Loup	French	Archaic
Frobisher Bay	Iqaluit (ᐃᖃᓗᐃᑦ)	Inuktitut	Archaic
Gjoa Haven	Uqsuqtuuq (ᐅᖅᓱᖅᑑᖅ)	Inuktitut	
Holman	Ulukhaktok	Inuinnaqtun	Archaic
Harrington Lake	Lac Mousseau	French	
Iroquois River	Rivière Richelieu	French	Archaic
Island of Orleans	Île d'Orléans	French	
Lansdowne House	Neskantaga	Oji-Cree	
Mount Royal	Mont-Royal	French	
Quebec City	Québec	French	
Queen Charlotte Island	Haida Gwaii	Haida	Archaic
Rankin Inlet	Kangiqliniq (ᑲᖏᕿᓂᖅ)	Inuktitut	
Saint Andrew	Saint-André-d'Argenteuil	French	Archaic
Saint John	Saint-Jean-sur-Richelieu	French	Archaic
Summer Beaver	Nibinamik (ᓃᐱᓇᒥᐦᐠ)	Ojibwe	
The River Ouse	La Rivière Grand	French	Archaic
The River Ouse	Kenhionhata:tie	Mohawk	
Whale Cove	Tikiraqjuaq (ᑎᑭᕋᕐᔪᐊᖅ)	Inuktitut	

=== Cambodia ===
During the Khmer Rouge period (1975–1979), the country was known in English as Democratic Kampuchea, closer to the endonym than its modern English exonym. The English exonym of Cambodia is based on the French exonym, Cambodge. The endonym is sometimes used in English, but the exonym is far more common.

Cambodia Kampuchea (កម្ពុជា)
English name	Endonym		Notes
English name	Name	Language	Notes
Phnom Penh	Phnum Pénh (ភ្នំពេញគ)	Khmer	
Sihanoukville	Krong Preah Sihanouk (ក្រុងព្រះសីហនុ)	Khmer	
Sihanoukville	Kampong Som (កំពង់សោម)	Khmer	

=== China ===
Some of the apparent "exonyms" for China are the result of change in romanization of Chinese to modern pinyin, for example "Tientsin" to "Tianjin". Other apparent exonyms are the result of the English name being based on one of the other varieties of Chinese besides Mandarin. Additionally, certain names which may now be considered exonyms actually preserve older Mandarin pronunciations which have changed in the intervening centuries. For all areas in mainland China, names written in Chinese are written in simplified characters. For all areas in the special administrative regions (SARs), the names will be written in traditional characters.

China Zhōngguó (中国)
English name	Endonym		Notes
English name	Name	Language	Notes
Canton	Guǎngzhōu (广州)	Mandarin	Archaic
Canton	Gwong2 Zau1	Cantonese	Archaic
Chengchow	Zhèngzhōu (郑州)	Mandarin	Archaic, change in romanization
Chengtu	Chéngdū (成都)	Mandarin	Archaic, change in romanization
Chungking	Chóngqìng (重庆)	Mandarin	Archaic, change in romanization
Foochow	Fúzhōu (福州)	Mandarin	Archaic, change in romanization
Forbidden City	Gùgōng (故宫), Zǐjìnchéng (紫禁城)	Mandarin	Means "Ancient Palace" and "Purple Forbidden City" respectively
Fukien	Fújiàn (福建)	Mandarin	Archaic, change in romanization
Gobi Desert	Gēbì Shāmò (戈壁沙漠)	Mandarin	
Gobi Desert	Govi (ᠭᠣᠪᠢ)	Mongolian	
Hangchow	Hángzhōu (杭州)	Mandarin	Archaic, change in romanization
Heilungkiang	Hēilóngjiāng (黑龙江)	Mandarin	Archaic, change in romanization
Heilungkiang	Khejluntszyan (Хэйлунцзян)	Russian	Archaic, change in romanization
Hohhot	Kökeqota (ᠬᠥᠬᠡᠬᠣᠲᠠ)	Mongolian	
Hohhot	Hūhéhàotè (呼和浩特) / Hūshì (呼市)	Mandarin	
Hokkien	Fújiàn (福建)	Hokkien	Archaic, but survives in English name of the language
Hong Kong	Hoeng1 Gong2 (香港)	Cantonese	
Hong Kong	Xiānggǎng	Mandarin	
Kwangchow	Gwong2 Zau1	Cantonese	
Kwangchow	Guǎngzhōu (广州)	Mandarin	Archaic, change in romanization
Kweilin	Gveilinz	Zhuang	
Kweilin	Guìlín (桂林)	Mandarin	Archaic, change in romanization
Macau	Ou3 mun2 (澳門)	Cantonese	
Macau	Àomén (澳门)	Mandarin	
Macau	Macau	Portuguese	
Mount Everest	Zhūmùlǎngmǎ Fēng (珠穆朗玛峰)		
Mount Everest	Chomolungma (ཇོ་མོ་གླང་མ)	Tibetan	
Nanking	Nánjīng (南京)	Mandarin	Archaic, change in romanization
Paotou	Bāotóu (包头)	Mandarin	Obsolete English spelling
Paotou	Buɣutu qota (ᠪᠤᠭᠤᠲᠤ ᠬᠣᠲᠠ)	Mongolian	Obsolete English spelling
Peking	Běijīng (北京)	Mandarin	Archaic, change in romanization
Port Arthur	Dàlián (大连)	Mandarin	Archaic
Santow	Shàntóu (汕头)	Mandarin	Archaic
Shaanxi	Shǎnxī (陕西)	Mandarin	Name spelled using Guoyeu Romatzyh romanization, as the name would be the same as Shanxi using pinyin without tones.
Sian	Xī'ān (西安)	Mandarin	Archaic, change in romanization
Sinkiang	Xīnjiāng (新疆)	Mandarin	Archaic, change in romanization
Soochow	Sūzhōu (苏州)	Mandarin	Archaic, change in romanization
Swatow	Shàntóu (汕头)	Mandarin	
Swatow	Suan1tao5 (汕头)	Teochew	English orthography close to Teochew pronunciation (Teochew 'n' sound is nasal)
Szechuan	Sìchuān (四川)	Mandarin	Archaic, change in romanization
Tibet	Bod (བོད)	Tibetan	
Tibet	Xīzàng (西藏)	Mandarin	
Tsingtao	Qīngdǎo (青岛)	Mandarin	Archaic, change in romanization
Yangtze River	Cháng jiāng (長江／长江)	Mandarin	Based on the archaic name Yángzǐ Jiāng (揚子江／扬子江)
Yellow River	Huáng Hé (黃河)	Mandarin	
Yenchi Yenki	Yánjí (延吉)	Mandarin	Archaic, change in romanization
Yenchi Yenki	Yenji (옌지), Yŏn'gil (연길)	Korean	

=== Croatia ===
Croatia Hrvatska
English name	Endonym		Notes
English name	Name	Language	Notes
Danube	Dunav	Croatian	
Dalmatia	Dalmacija	Croatian	
Istria	Istra	Croatian	
Ragusa	Dubrovnik	Croatian	Historical exonym
Zara	Zadar	Croatian	Historical exonym

=== Cuba ===
Cuba
English name	Endonym		Notes
English name	Name	Language	Notes
Havana	(La) Habana	Spanish	

=== Cyprus ===
Cyprus Kýpros/ Kıbrıs
English name	Endonym		Notes
English name	Place	Language	Notes
Famagusta	Ammokhóstos (Αμμόχωστος)	Greek	
Famagusta	Gazimaǧusa	Turkish	
Kyrenia	Girne	Turkish	
Kyrenia	Kerýneia (Κερύνεια)	Greek	
Limassol	Lemesós (Λεμεσός)	Greek	
Limassol	Limasol	Turkish	
Nicosia	Lefkoşa	Turkish	
Nicosia	Lefkosía (Λευκωσία)	Greek	

=== Czech Republic ===
Historically, English-language sources used German names for many places in what is now the Czech Republic. With some exceptions (such as the Elbe and Oder rivers, both of which flow into Germany) this is no longer done by most sources.

Czech Republic Česká republika
English name	Endonym		Notes
English name	Name	Language	Notes
Beskids	Beskydy	Czech	
Bohemia	Čechy	Czech	Latin name
Bohemian Forest	Šumava	Czech	
Bohemian Karst	Český kras	Czech	
Bohemian Paradise	Český ráj	Czech	
Bohemian Switzerland	České Švýcarsko	Czech	
Budweis	České Budějovice	Czech	Archaic, German name
Carlsbad	Karlovy Vary	Czech	Archaic, German name
Elbe river	Labe	Czech	German name
Fichtel Mountains	Smrčiny	Czech	German name
Franzensbad	Františkovy Lázně	Czech	Archaic, German name
Giant Mountains	Krkonoše	Czech	
Hanakia	Haná	Czech	Archaic
Lachia	Lašsko	Czech	
Marienbad	Mariánské Lázně	Czech	Archaic, German name
Moravia	Morava	Czech	Latin name
Moravian Slovakia	Slovácko	Czech	
Moravian Wallachia	Valašsko	Czech	
Oder river	Odra	Czech	German name
Ore Mountains	Krušné hory	Czech	
Pilsen	Plzeň	Czech	Archaic, German name
Prague	Praha	Czech	French name
Silesia	Slezsko	Czech	
Silesia	Ślōnsk	Silesian	
Sudetes, Sudeten, Sudeten Mountains	Krkonošsko-jesenická subprovincie, Sudety	Czech	
Sudetenland	Sudety	Czech	
Upper Palatine Forest	Český les	Czech	

=== Denmark ===
Denmark Danmark
English name	Endonym		Notes
English name	Name	Language	Notes
Copenhagen	København	Danish	
Elsinore	Helsingør	Danish	Dated
Funen	Fyn	Danish	
Jutland	Jylland	Danish	
Sleswick	Schleswig	Low German	
Sleswick	Slesvig	Danish	
The Scaw	Skagen	Danish	Dated
Zealand	Sjælland	Danish	

==== Greenland ====
Several places were known under Danish names, or a variant of them. Now only the local Greenlandic is used.

Greenland Kalaallit Nunaat
English name	Endonym		Notes
English name	Name	Language	Notes
Frederikdshab	Paamiut	Greenlandic	Obsolete
Godthab	Nuuk	Greenlandic	Obsolete
Jacobshaven	Ilulissat	Greenlandic	Obsolete
Sondre Stromfjord	Kangerlussuaq	Greenlandic	Obsolete
Sondrestrom	Kangerlussuaq	Greenlandic	Obsolete
Thule	Qaanaaq	Greenlandic	Obsolete

=== Egypt ===
Egypt Miṣr (مصر)
English name	Endonym		Notes
English name	Name	Language	Notes
Alexandria	Al-Iskandariyyah (الإسكندرية)	Egyptian Arabic	
Alexandria	Alexandria (ⲁⲗⲉⲝⲁⲛⲇⲣⲓⲁ)	Coptic	
Alexandria	Eskendereyyah (اسكندرية)	Egyptian Arabic	
Alexandria	Rakote (ⲣⲁⲕⲟϯ )	Coptic	
Cairo	Al-Qāhirah (القاهرة)	Standard Arabic	
Cairo	Maṣr (مَصر)	Egyptian Arabic	
Giza	Al-Jīzah (الجيزة)	Standard Arabic	
Giza	El-Gīzeh (الجيزة)	Egyptian Arabic	
Luxor	Al-Uqṣur (الأقصر)	Standard Arabic	
Luxor	Babe (ⲡⲁⲡⲉ)	Coptic	
Luxor	Loqṣor (الأقصر)	Egyptian Arabic	
Memphis	Manf (مَنْف)	Standard Arabic	
Memphis	Memfi (ⲙⲉⲙϥⲓ)	Coptic	
Nile	An-Nīl (النيل)	Standard Arabic	
Nile	En-Nīl (النيل)	Egyptian Arabic	
Nile	Nilus	Latin	
Port Said	Būr Sa'īd (بور سعيد)	Standard Arabic	
Port Said	Bor Sa'īd (بور سعيد)	Egyptian Arabic	
Suez	As-Suways (السوَيس)	Standard Arabic	

The English name of Egypt derives from the French name, Egypte, which is derived from the Greek name, Aigyptos (Αίγυπτος).

=== Estonia ===
Estonia Eesti
English name	Endonym		Notes
English name	Name	Language	Notes
Lake Peipus	Peipsi järv	Estonian	
Reval	Tallinn	Estonian	Obsolete

=== Finland ===
Finland Suomi
English name	Endonym		Notes
English name	Name	Language	Notes
Karelia	Karjala	Finnish	From Latin
Lapland	Lappi	Finnish	From Swedish Lappland
Ostrobothnia	Pohjanmaa	Finnish	From Latin, compare Swedish Österbotten
Savonia	Savo	Finnish	From Latin
Tavastia	Häme	Finnish	From Latin

=== France ===
France
English name	Endonym		Notes
English name	Name	Language	Notes
Bay of Biscay	Golfe de Gascogne	French	
Bethwyn	Béthune	French	Archaic
Brittany	Breizh	Breton	
Brittany	Bretagne	French	
Burgundy	Bourgogne	French	
Camerick	Cambrai	French	Obsolete
Cressy	Crécy-en-Ponthieu	French	
Dauphiny	Dalfinat	Occitan	
Dauphiny	Darfenât	Arpitan	
Dauphiny	Dauphiné	French	Archaic
Dunkirk	Dunkerque	French	
English Channel	La Manche	French	
French Flanders	Flandre française	French	
French Riviera	Côte d'Azur	French	
Gascony	Gascogne	French	
Gascony	Gasconha	Gascon	
Lyons	Liyon	Arpitan	
Lyons	Lyon	French	Archaic
Marseilles	Marseille	French	Archaic
Marseilles	Marselha	Occitan	
Rheims	Reims	French	Archaic
Rhine River	Rhin	French	
Rone	Rouen	French	Obsolete
Ushant	Eusa	Breton	
Ushant	Ouessant	French	

=== Georgia ===
Georgia Sakartvelo (საქართველო)
English name	Endonym		Notes
English name	Name	Language	Notes
Caucasus	Kavkasioni (კავკასიონი)	Georgian	
Tiflis	Tbilisi (თბილისი)	Georgian	Obsolete

=== Germany ===
This list does not include German place names with ß written with "ss" or umlauts being removed in some writing.

Germany Deutschland
English name	Endonym		Notes
English name	Name	Language	Notes
Aix-la-Chapelle	Aachen	Standard German	Archaic
Aix-la-Chapelle	Oche	Ripuarian	
Baltic Sea	Ostsee	Standard German	
Bavaria	Bayern	Standard German	
Brunswick	Braunschweig	Standard German	Archaic
Brunswick	Brunswiek	Low Saxon	
Cleves	Kleve	Standard German	Archaic
Coblence	Koblenz	Standard German	Archaic
Cologne	Kölle	Ripuarian	
Cologne	Köln	Standard German	
Constance	Konstanz	Standard German	Dated
Danube river	Donau	Standard German	
Eastphalia	Oostfalen	Low Saxon	
Eastphalia	Ostfalen	Standard German	
Franconia	Franken	Standard German	
Franconia	Frankn	Austro-Bavarian	
Franconian Jura	Frankenalb	Standard German	Frankenjura also used in German
Frankfort	Frangford (am Maa)	Hessian	Archaic
Frankfort	Frankfurt (am Main)	Standard German	Archaic
Hamelin	Hameln	Standard German	
Hanover	Hannober	Low Saxon	
Hanover	Hannover	Standard German	
Heligoland	deät Lun	Heligolandic North Frisian	
Heligoland	Hälilönj	Bökingharde North Frisian	
Heligoland	Helgoland	Standard German	
Hesse	Hessen	Standard German	
Hessia	Hessen	Standard German	
Hither Pomerania	Vorpommern	Standard German	
Kaufungen Forest	Kaufunger Wald	Standard German	
Kiel Canal	Nordostseekanal	Standard German	
Knüll	Knüllgebirge	Standard German	German name also used in English
Lake Constance	Bodensee	Standard German	
Lower Bavarian Upland	Niederbayerisches Hügelland	Standard German	
Lusatia	Lausitz	Standard German	
Lusatia	Łužica	Upper Sorbian	
Lusatia	Łužyca	Lower Sorbian	
Malborow	Marburg	Standard German	Archaic
Mayence	Mainz	Standard German	Archaic
Mentz	Mainz	Standard German	Archaic, British English
Moselle river	Mosel	Standard German	
Moselle river	Musel	Moselle Franconian	
Munich	Minga	Austro-Bavarian	
Munich	München	Standard German	
Nuremberg	Narrnberch	East Franconian	
Nuremberg	Nürnberg	Standard German	
Ore Mountains	Erzgebirge	Standard German	
Palatinate	Palz	Standard German	
Palatinate	Pfalz	Standard German	
Pomerania	Pommern	Standard German	
Prussia	Preußen	Standard German	
Ratisbon	Regensburg	Standard German	Archaic
Ratisbon	Rengschburch	Austro-Bavarian	
Rhenish Massif	Rheinisches Schiefergebirge	Standard German	
Rhine river	Rhein	Standard German	
Saxe-Coburg-Gotha	Sachsen-Coburg und Gotha	Standard German	English now uses translation Saxe-Coburg and Gotha
Saxony	Sachsen	Standard German	
Saxony	Sassen	Low Saxon	
Swabia	Schwaben	Standard German	
Szczecin Lagoon	Stettiner Haff	Standard German	
Thuringia	Thüringen	Standard German	
Thuringia	Tréier	Moselle Franconian	
Treves	Trier	Standard German	Archaic, French name
Western Pomerania	Vorpommern	Standard German	
Westphalia	Westfalen	Low Saxon	
Westphalia	Westfalen	Standard German	

=== Greece ===
The exonym for Greece in English comes from Magna Graecia, which was a historical region in Italy colonized by the Greeks. The endonym Ellás comes from Hellen, the mythological ancestor of the Greeks.

Greece Elládha/ Ellás (Ελλάδα/ Ἑλλάς)
English name	Endonym		Notes
English name	Name	Language	Notes
Attica	Attikí (Αττική)	Greek	
Athens	Athína (Αθήνα)	Greek	
Boetia	Voiotía (Βοιωτία)	Greek	
Corfu	Kérkyra (Κέρκυρα)	Greek	
Corinth	Kórinthos (Κόρινθος)	Greek	
Crete	Kríti (Κρήτη)	Greek	
Cyclades	Kykládhes (Κυκλάδες)	Greek	
Dodecanese	Dhodhekánisa (Δωδεκάνησα)	Greek	
Epirus	Ipeiros (Ήπειρος)	Greek	
Euboea	Evvoia (Εύβοια)	Greek	
Heraklion	Irákleio (Ηράκλειο)	Greek	
Ithaca	Itháki (Ιθάκη)	Greek	
Lepanto	Náfpaktos (Νάυπακτος)	Greek	Archaic
Macedonia	Makedonía (Μακεδονία)	Greek	
Missolonghi	Mesológi (Μεσολόγγι)	Greek	
Naupactus	Náfpaktos (Νάυπακτος)	Greek	Greek name also used in English
Navarino	Pýlos (Πύλος)	Greek	Archaic
Patras	Pátra (Πάτρα)	Greek	
Peloponnese	Pelopónnisos (Πελοπόννησος)	Greek	
Philippi	Fílippoi (Φίλιπποι)	Greek	
Piraeus	Peiraiás (Πειραιάς)	Greek	
Rhodes	Ródhos (Ρόδος)	Greek	
Rhodope Mountains	Rodhópi (Ροδόπη)	Greek	
Salonica	Thessaloníki (Θεσσαλονίκη)	Greek	Archaic
Samothrace	Samothráki (Σαμοθράκη)	Greek	
Sparta	Spárti (Σπάρτη)	Greek	
Thebes	Thíva (Θήβα)	Greek	
Thessalonica	Thessaloníki (Θεσσαλονίκη)	Greek	Greek name also used in English
Thessaly	Thessalía (Θεσσαλία)	Greek	
Thrace	Thráki (Θράκη)	Greek	
Zante	Zákynthos (Ζάκυνθος)	Greek	Archaic

=== Hungary ===
Hungary Magyarország
English name	Endonym		Notes
English name	Name	Language	Notes
Carpathian Mountains	Kárpátok	Hungarian	
Comorn	Komárom	Hungarian	Dated
Danube River	Duna	Hungarian	
Pesth	Pest	Hungarian	Archaic

=== India ===
India Bhārat (भारत)
English name	Endonym		Notes
English name	Name	Language	Notes
Allahabad	Prayagraj (प्रयागराज)	Hindi	Officially amended to Prayagraj but still in use in popular culture.
Allepey	Alappuzha (ആലപ്പുഴ)	Malayalam	Dated
Bangalore	Bengaluru (ಬೆಂಗಳೂರು)	Kannada	
Benares	Varanasi (वाराणसी)	Hindi	Dated
Bombay	Mumbai (मुंबई)	Marathi	Dated
Calcutta	Kolkata (কলকাতা)	Bengali	Dated
Cawnpore	Kanpur (कानपुर)	Hindi	Obsolete
Cochin	Kochi (കൊച്ചി)	Malayalam	
Delhi	Dilli (दिल्ली)	Hindi	
Ganges River	Ganga (गंगा)	Hindi	
Indus River	Sindhū (सिन्धु)	Sanskrit	
Jaypore	Jaipur (जयपुर)	Hindi	Obsolete
Laccadive Islands	Lakshadweep (ലക്ഷദ്വീപ്)	Malayalam	Obsolete
Madras	Chennai (சென்னை)	Tamil	Dated
Palghat	Palakkad (പാലക്കാട്)	Malayalam	Obsolete
Pondicherry	Puducherry (புதுச்சேரி)	Tamil	Dated
Poona	Pune (पुणे)	Marathi	Dated
Simla	Shimla (शिमला)	Hindi	Obsolete
Trivandrum	Thiruvananthapuram (തിരുവനന്തപുരം)	Malayalam	

=== Indonesia ===
Indonesia
English name	Endonym		Note
English name	Name	Language	Note
Bencoolen	Bengkulu	Indonesian	Historical
Billiton	Belitung	Indonesian	Obsolete
Borneo	Kalimantan	Indonesian	These exonyms are also unofficially used in Indonesia.
Celebes	Sulawesi	Indonesian	These exonyms are also unofficially used in Indonesia.
Ceram	Seram	Indonesian	
Lesser Sunda Islands (Nusa Tenggara Islands)	Kepulauan Nusa Tenggara	Indonesian	
Lesser Sunda Islands (Nusa Tenggara Islands)	Kepulauan Sunda Kecil	Indonesian	Historical
New Guinea (Papua)	Papua	Indonesian	
New Guinea (Papua)	Irian Jaya	Indonesian	Historical
New Guinea (Papua)	Nugini	Indonesian	Fossil word, only in compounds.
Tengaron	Tenggarong	Indonesian	Archaic

=== Iran ===
Iran Irān (اݐران)
English name	Endonym		Note
English name	Name	Language	Note
Bushire	Bushehr (بوشهر)	Persian	Obsolete
Isfahan	Ešfahān (اصفهان)	Persian	
Meshed	Mashhad (مشهد)	Persian	Obsolete
Teheran	Tehran (تهران)	Persian	Obsolete

=== Iraq ===
Iraq Al-Irāq (العراق)
English name	Endonym		Notes
English name	Name	Language	Notes
Ctesiphon	Ṭaysafūn (طيسفون) or Qaṭaysfūn (قطيسفون)	Standard Arabic	
Duhok	Dahūk (دهوك)	Standard Arabic	
Duhok	Dihok (دهۆک)	Kurdish	
Duhok	Beth Nohadra (ܒܝܬ ܢܘܗܕܪܐ)	Syriac	
Euphrates River	Al-Furāt (الفُرات)	Standard Arabic	
Euphrates River	Firat	Kurdish	
Euphrates River	Pǝrāth (ܦܪܬ)	Syriac	
Mosul	Al-Mawṣil (المَوْصِل)	Standard Arabic	
Mosul	Māwṣil (ܡܘܨܠ)	Syriac	
Mosul	Mosil (مووسڵ)	Kurdish	
Tigris River	Deqlath (ܕܹܩܠܵܬ)	Syriac	
Tigris River	Dîcle (دیجلە)	Kurdish	
Tigris River	Dijla (دِجْلَة)	Standard Arabic	

=== Ireland ===
The vast majority of placenames in Ireland are anglicisations, or phonetic renderings, of Irish language names. The exceptions to this are listed here:

Ireland Éire
English name	Endonym		Notes
English name	Name	Language	Notes
Arklow	an tInbhear Mór	Irish	
Carlingford	Cairlinn	Irish	
Connaught	Connacht	Irish	Dated
Dalkey	Deilginis	Irish	
Dursey	Baoi Bhéarra, Oileán Baoi	Irish	
Dublin	Baile Átha Cliath	Irish	
Fastnet	Carraig Aonair	Irish	
Haulbowline	Inis Sionnach	Irish	
Howth	Binn Éadair	Irish	
Killarney	Cill Airne	Irish	
Lambay	Reachrainn	Irish	
Leinster	Laighin	Irish	
Leixlip	Léim an Bhrádain	Irish	
Meath	Mí	Irish	
Munster	Mumhan	Irish	
Oxmantown	Baile Lochlannach	Irish	
Saltee	Na Sailtí	Irish	
Selskar	Seilsceir	Irish	
Skerries	Na Sceirí	Irish	
Ulster	Ulaidh	Irish	
Waterford	Port Láirge	Irish	
Wexford	Loch Garman	Irish	
Wicklow	Cill Mhantáin	Irish	

=== Israel ===
The below listing is only a summary. Modern Israeli transcription systems (romanization of Hebrew) vary from the spellings of many hundreds of place names of Ancient Israel adopted by Bible translations - both Christian, such as the King James Version (1611) and also Jewish versions such as the JPS (1917).

Israel Yisrael (ישראל)
English name	Endonym		Notes
English name	Name	Language	
Acre	Ako (עכו)	Modern Hebrew	Greek name
Beersheba	Beer Sheva' (באר שבע)	Modern Hebrew	
Capernaum	Kfar Nachum (כפר נחום)	Modern Hebrew	Latin name
Dead Sea	Āl-Baḥrū l-Maytū (اَلْبَحْرُ الْمَيْتُ)	Standard Arabic	
Dead Sea	Yam hamMelaḥ (ים המלח)	Modern Hebrew	
Galilee	haGalil (הגליל)	Modern Hebrew	
Jaffa	Yafo (יפו)	Modern Hebrew	
Joppa	Yafo (יפו)	Modern Hebrew	Greek name, dated
Jerusalem	Ūršalīm (أُورُشَلِيمَ)	Standard Arabic	
Jerusalem	Yerushalayim (ירושלים)	Modern Hebrew	Latin name
Nazareth	Natzrat (נצרת)	Modern Hebrew	Greek name
Sea of Galilee	Imat Tbria (بحيرة طبريا)	Standard Arabic	
Sea of Galilee	Yamat haKineret (ימת הכינרת)	Modern Hebrew	
Safed	Tzfat (צפת)	Modern Hebrew	Arabic name
Tiberias	Tverya (טבריה)	Modern Hebrew	Greek name

=== Italy ===
Italy Italia
English name	Endonym		Notes
English name	Name	Language	Notes
Apulia	Puglia	Standard Italian	
Apulia	Pùglia	Neapolitan	
Aventine Hill	Aventino	Standard Italian	
Caelian Hill	Celio	Standard Italian	
Capitoline Hill	Campidoglio	Standard Italian	
Florence	Firenze	Standard Italian	French name
Genoa	Genova	Standard Italian	
Genoa	Zêna	Ligurian	
Herculaneum	Ercolano	Standard Italian	English uses different names for the ancient and modern places
Janiculum	Gianicolo	Standard Italian	Latin name
Latium	Lazio	Standard Italian	English uses different names for the ancient and modern places
Leghorn	Livorno	Standard Italian	Obsolete
Lombardy	Lombardéa	Lombard	French name
Lombardy	Lombardia	Standard Italian	French name
Montferrat	Monferrato	Standard Italian	French name
Montferrat	Monfrà	Piedmontese	French name
Naples	Napoli	Standard Italian	French name
Naples	Napule	Neapolitan	French name
Padua	Padova	Standard Italian	
Padua	Pàdova	Venetian	
Piedmont	Piemont	Piedmontese	
Piedmont	Piemonte	Standard Italian	
Phlegraean Fields	Campi Flegrei	Standard Italian	
Pompeii	Pompei	Standard Italian	Latin name
Pontine Marshes	Agro Pontino	Standard Italian	
Rome	Roma	Standard Italian	French name
Rubicon River	Rubicone	Standard Italian	
Sardinia	Sardegna	Standard Italian	
Sicily	Sicilia	Standard Italian	
Sicily	Sicilia	Sicilian	
Sienna	Siena	Standard Italian	Obsolete
Syracuse	Sarasusa	Sicilian	
Syracuse	Siracusa	Standard Italian	
The Marches	Marche	Standard Italian	Obsolete
Tiber	Tevere	Standard Italian	Latin name
Tuscany	Toscana	Standard Italian	
Tyrol	Tirolo	Standard Italian	
Venice	Venesia	Venetian	French name
Venice	Venezia	Standard Italian	French name
Vesuvius	Vesuvio	Neapolitan	Latin name
Vesuvius	Vesuvio	Standard Italian	Latin name

Many English exonyms were derived from the French variations, such as Rome and Venice.

=== Japan ===
Japan Nihon, Nippon (日本)
English name	Endonym		Notes
English name	Name	Language	Notes
Bonin Islands	Ogasawara Guntou (小笠原群島)	Japanese	
Iwo Jima	Iou-tou (硫黄島)	Japanese	Alternative reading of endonym
Liancourt Rocks	Takeshima (竹島)	Japanese	

The English name for Japan derives from the Portuguese name for the country, Japão, which was based on a Chinese transcription of Japan's endonym, Nippon or Nihon (日本).

=== Laos ===
Laos Lāo (ລາວ)
English name	Endonym		Notes
English name	Name	Language	Notes
Louangphabang	Luang Prabang (ຫລວງພະບາງ)	Lao	Also spelled Luangphabang
Savannakhet	Kaysone Phomvihane (ໄກສອນ ພົມວິຫານ)	Lao	
Viangchan	Wīang chan (ວຽງຈັນ)	Lao	
Vientiane	Wīang chan (ວຽງຈັນ)	Lao	from French

An older variant of the country's name in English uses the definite article, the Laos, which is now obsolete.

=== Latvia ===
Latvia Latvija
English name	Endonym		Notes
English name	Name	Language	Notes
Courland	Kurzeme	Latvian	
Lettgallia	Latgale	Latvian	Dated
Semigallia	Zemgale	Latvian	Dated

=== Lebanon ===
Lebanon Lubnān (لبنان)
English name	Endonym		Notes
English name	Name	Language	Notes
Sidon	Ṣaydā (صيدا)	Standard Arabic	
Tyre	Ṣūr (صور)	Standard Arabic	
Tripoli	Ṭarābulus (طرابلس)	Standard Arabic	

=== Libya ===
Libya Libiyā (ليبيا)
English name	Endonym		Notes
English name	Name	Language	Notes
Cyrenaica	Barqah (برقة)	Standard Arabic	
Sirte	Sirt (سرت)	Standard Arabic	
Tripoli	Ṭrables	Berber	
Tripoli	Ṭarābulus (طرابلس)	Standard Arabic	
Tripoli	Ṭrābləs (طرابلس)	Maghrebi Arabic	
Tripolitania	Ṭrables	Berber	
Tripolitania	Ṭarābulus (طرابلس)	Standard Arabic	
Tripolitania	Ṭrābləs (طرابلس)	Maghrebi Arabic	

=== Lithuania ===
Lithuania Lietuva
English name	Endonym		Notes
English name	Name	Language	Notes
Neman river	Nemunas	Lithuanian	
Nieman river	Nemunas	Lithuanian	Dated
Samogitia	Žemaitija	Lithuanian	
Sudovia	Sudūva	Lithuanian	
Yotvingia	Dainava	Lithuanian	
Vilna or Wilna	Vilnius	Lithuanian	Obsolete

=== Malaysia ===
Malaysia
English name	Endonym		Notes
English name	Name	Language	Notes
Malacca	Melaka	Malay	
Penang Island	Pulau Pinang	Malay	
Johore	Johor	Malay	

=== Mexico ===
Mexico México
English name	Endonym		Notes
English name	Name	Language	Notes
Kino Bay	Hermosillo	Spanish	

=== Moldova ===
Moldova
English name	Endonym		Notes
English name	Name	Language	Notes
Kishinev	Chișinău	Romanian	Obsolete

=== Mongolia ===
Mongolia Mongγol Ulus (Монгол Улc/ ᠮᠣᠩᠭᠣᠯ ᠤᠯᠤᠰ)
English name	Endonym		Notes
English name	Name	Language	Notes
Gobi Desert	Govi (Говь/ ᠭᠣᠪᠢ)	Mongolian	
Ulan Bator	Ulaanbaatar (Улаанбаатар/ ᠤᠯᠠᠭᠠᠨᠪᠠᠭᠠᠲᠤᠷ)	Mongolian	Obsolete

=== Morocco ===
Morocco Al-Magrib (المغرب)
English name	Endonym		Notes
English name	Name	Language	Notes
Casablanca	Ad-Dār Al-Bayḍā' (الدار البيضاء)	Standard Arabic	
Casablanca	Kaza (كازا)	Moroccan Arabic	Informal name for the city
Casablanca	Anfa (ⴰⵏⴼⴰ)	Berber	
Fez	Fās (ⴼⴰⵙ)	Berber	
Fez	Fās (فاس)	Standard Arabic	
Marrakesh	Murrākush (مراكش)	Standard Arabic	
Tangier	Ṭanja (ⵟⴰⵏⵊⴰ)	Berber	
Tangier	Ṭanjah (طنجة)	Standard Arabic	

The English name for the country derives from the city name Marrakesh. The Arabic name for the country, al-Magrib (المغرب), is Arabic for "the west".

=== Myanmar ===
Myanmar Myanma (မြန်မာ)
English name	Endonym		Notes
English name	Name	Language	Notes
Naypyidaw	Nay Pyi Taw (နေပြည်တော်)	Burmese	
Pagan	Bagan (ပုဂံ)	Burmese	Dated
Rangoon	Yangon (ရန်ကုန်မြို့)	Burmese	Dated
Ummerapoora	Amarapura (အမရပူရ)	Burmese	Dated

=== Nepal ===
Nepal Nepāl (नेपाल)
English name	Endonym		Notes
English name	Name	Language	Notes
Mount Everest	Sagarmatha (सगरमाथा)	Nepali	

=== Netherlands ===
Netherlands Nederland
English name	Endonym		Notes
English name	Name	Language	Notes
Brill	Brielle	Dutch	Obsolete
Dort	Dordrecht	Dutch	Obsolete
Flushing	Vlissingen	Dutch	Obsolete
Guelders	Gelderland	Dutch	Dated
Leyden	Leiden	Dutch	Dated
Meuse river	Maas	Dutch	French name
Rhine river	Rijn	Dutch	
Ryswick	Rijswijk	Dutch	Obsolete
The Hague	Den Haag	Dutch	

=== North Korea ===
The inhabitants of North Korea prefer the official name of the country, the Democratic People's Republic of Korea (DPRK), Chosŏn, or simply Korea.

North Korea Chosŏn (조선)
English name	Endonym		Notes
English name	Name	Language	Notes
Diamond Mountain	Kŭmgang-san (금강산)	Korean	English now uses rough transliteration Mount Kumgang
Tumen River	Tuman-gang (두만강)	Korean	Mandarin name, as the river borders China
Yalu River	Amnok-kang (압록강)	Korean	Mandarin name, as the river borders China

=== Palestine ===
Palestine Filasṭīn (فلسطين)
English name	Endonym		Notes
English name	Name	Language	Notes
Bethany	Al-'Eizariya (العيزرية)	Standard Arabic	
Bethlehem	Beyt Laḥm (بيت لحم)	Levantine Arabic	
Bethlehem	Bayta Laḥm (بيت لحم)	Standard Arabic	
Gaza City	Ghazzah (غَزَّة)	Standard Arabic	
Hebron	Al-Khalīl (الخليل)	Standard Arabic	
Jericho	Arīḥā (أريحا)	Standard Arabic	
Jerusalem	Al-Quds (القُدس)	Standard Arabic	Latin name

=== Philippines ===
Philippines Pilipinas
English name	Endonym		Notes
English name	Name	Language	Notes
Cebu	Sugbo	Cebuano	
Davao	Dabaw	Cebuano	
Manila	Maynila	Tagalog	

=== Poland ===
Poland Polska
English name	Endonym		Notes
English name	Name	Language	Notes
Auschwitz	Oświęcim	Polish	Dated, German name
Breslau	Wrocław	Polish	Dated, German name
Carpathian Mountains	Karpaty	Polish	
Cracow	Kraków	Polish	
Danzig	Gdańsk	Polish	Dated, German name
Giant Mountains	Karkonosze	Polish	
Kashubia	Kaszëbë	Kashubian	
Kashubia	Kaszuby	Polish	
Kuyavia	Kujawy	Polish	
Mazovia	Mazowsze	Polish	
Mazuria	Mazury	Polish	
Oder river	Odra	Polish	
Pomerania	Pomorze	Polish	
Subcarpathia	Podkarpacie	Polish	
Sudetes, Sudeten, Sudeten Mountains	Sudety	Polish	
Silesia	Śląsk	Polish	
Silesia	Ślōnsk	Silesian	
Vistula river	Wisła	Polish	
Warsaw	Warszawa	Polish	

=== Portugal ===
Portugal
English name	Endonym		Notes
English name	Name	Language	Notes
Azores	Açores	Portuguese	Spanish name
Braganza	Bragança	Portuguese	Dated, Spanish name
Lisbon	Lisboa	Portuguese	
Oporto	Porto	Portuguese	Obsolete
Tagus river	Tejo	Portuguese	Latin name

=== Romania ===
Romania România
English name	Endonym		Notes
English name	Name	Language	Notes
Bucharest	București	Romanian	
Carpathian Mountains	Carpați	Romanian	
Danube River	Dunărea	Romanian	
Jassy	Iași	Romanian	Obsolete
Northern Dobruja	Dobrogea, Dobrogea de Nord	Romanian	Romanian part of the region of Dobruja
Transylvania	Transilvania	Romanian	
Wallachia	Țara Românească, Valahia	Romanian	

=== Russia ===
Russia Rossiya (Россия)
English name	Endonym		Notes
English name	Name	Language	Notes
Archangel	Arkhangelsk (Архангельск)	Russian	Dated
Caucasus	Kavkaz (Кавказ)	Russian	
Moscow	Moskva (Москва)	Russian	
Orel	Oryol (Орёл)	Russian	Obsolete
Plescow	Pskov (Псков)	Russian	Obsolete
Saint Petersburg	Sankt-Peterburg (Санкт-Петербург)	Russian	
Siberia	Sibir' (Сибирь)	Russian	

=== Saudi Arabia ===
Saudi Arabia As-Sa'ūdīyah (السعودية)
English name	Endonym		Notes
English name	Name	Language	Notes
Jeddah	Jiddah (جِدَّة)	Standard Arabic	
Mecca	Makkah (مکة)	Standard Arabic	
Medina	Al-Madīnah (المدينة)	Standard Arabic	
Riyadh	Er-Riyāḍ (الرياض)	Najdi Arabic	
Riyadh	Ar-Riyāḍ (الرياض)	Standard Arabic	

=== Serbia ===
Serbia Srbija (Србија)
English name	Endonym		Notes
English name	Name	Language	Notes
Balkan Mountains	Stara Planina (Стара Планина)	Serbian	
Belgrade	Beograd (Београд)	Serbian	French name
Danube river	Dunav (Дунав)	Serbian	

=== Slovakia ===
Slovakia Slovensko
English name	Endonym		Notes
English name	Name	Language	Notes
Carpathian Mountains	Karpaty	Slovak	
Cassovia	Košice	Slovak	Latin name
Danube river	Dunaj	Slovak	
Gerlach Peak	Gerlachovský štít	Slovak	
Maple Mountains	Javorníky	Slovak	
Slovak Ore Mountains	Slovenské rudohorie	Slovak	

=== Slovenia ===
Slovenia Slovenija
English name	Endonym		Notes
English name	Name	Language	Notes
Carinthia	Koroška	Slovene	
Inner Carniola	Notranjska	Slovene	
Karawanks	Karavanke	Slovene	
Karst	Kras	Slovene	
Lower Carniola	Dolenjska	Slovene	
Slovene Littoral	Primorska	Slovene	
Styria	Štajerska	Slovene	
Upper Carniola	Gorenjska	Slovene	

=== Somalia ===
Somalia Soomaaliya
English name	Endonym		Notes
English name	Name	Language	Notes
Baidoa	Baydhabo	Somali	
Chisimaio	Kismaayo	Somali	Obsolete
Mogadishu	Muqdisho	Somali	
Villabruzzi	Jowhaar	Somali	Dated

=== South Africa ===
Many South African towns have multiple names due to the number of languages. Additionally, some places have been renamed from English and Afrikaans.

South Africa
English name	Endonym		Notes
English name	Name	Language	Notes
Aliwal North	Maletswai	Sotho	
Fish Hoek	Vishoek	Afrikaans	
Grahamstown	Grahamstad	Afrikaans	Dated in Afrikaans and English
Makhanda	iRhini	Xhosa	
Queenstown	Komani	Sotho	

=== South Korea ===
South Korea Hanguk (한국)
English name	Endonym		Notes
English name	Name	Language	Notes
Liancourt Rocks	Dokdo (독도)	Korean	
Port Hamilton	Geomundo (거문도)	Korean	
Pusan	Busan (부산시)	Korean	Dated
Quelpart	Jeju (제주도)	Korean	Obsolete

=== Spain ===
English uses Spanish-language exonyms for some places in non-Spanish speaking regions of Spain.

Spain España
English name	Endonym		Notes
English name	Name	Language	Notes
Andalusia	Andalucía	Spanish	
Basque Country	País Vasco	Spanish	
Basque Country	Euskadi	Basque	
Biscay	Bizkaia	Basque	
Biscay	Vizcaya	Spanish	
Castile	Castilla	Spanish	
Catalonia	Catalunya	Catalan	Latin name
Corunna	A Coruña	Galician	Obsolete
Douro	Duero	Spanish	Portuguese name
Majorca	Mallorca	Catalan	Dated
Minorca	Menorca	Catalan	Dated
Navarre	Nafarroa	Basque	
Pampeluna	Pamplona	Spanish	Dated
Saragossa	Zaragoza	Spanish	Dated
Seville	Sevilla	Spanish	
Tagus	Tajo	Spanish	Latin name
Teneriffe	Tenerife	Spanish	Obsolete, French name
The Groyne	A Coruña	Galician	Obsolete
Vittoria	Vitoria-Gasteiz	Compound of the Spanish and Basque names (often used separately)	Dated
Vittoria	Vitorixe	Basque form of Spanish name	Dated

=== Sri Lanka ===
Sri Lanka was known as Ceylon in English until 1972.

Sri Lanka Shri Lanka (ශ්‍රී ලංකා)/ Ilaṅkai (இலங்கை)
English name	Endonym		Notes
English name	Name	Language	Notes
Adam's Peak	Civaṉoḷipātam (சிவனொளிபாதம்) Civaṉaṭipātam (சிவனடிபாதம்)	Tamil	
Adam's Peak	Śrī Pāda (ශ්‍රී පාද)	Sinhala	
Batticaloa	Maṭṭakkaḷappu (மட்டக்களப்பு)	Tamil	
Batticaloa	Madakalapuwa (මඩකලපුව)	Sinhala	
Chilaw	Cilāpam (சிலாபம்)	Tamil	
Chilaw	Halawta (හලාවත)	Sinhala	
Colombo	Kolamba (කොළඹ)	Sinhala	
Colombo	Koḻumpu (கொழும்பு)	Tamil	
Elephant Pass	Āṉaiyiṟavu (ஆனையிறவு)	Tamil	
Elephant Pass	Alimankada (අලිමංකඩ)	Sinhala	
Galle	Galla (ගාල්ල)	Sinhala	
Galle	Kāli (காலி)	Tamil	
Jaffna	Yāḻppāṇam (யாழ்ப்பாணம்)	Tamil	
Jaffna	Yāpanaya (යාපනය)	Sinhala	
Kandy	Kaṇṭi (கண்டி)	Tamil	
Kandy	Mahanuwara (මහනුවර)	Sinhala	
Kayts	Ūrkāvaṟtuṟai (ஊர்காவற்துறை)	Tamil	
Kayts	Kayiṭs (කයිට්ස්)	Sinhala	
Mutwal	Modara (මෝදර)	Sinhala	
Mutwal	Mukattuvāram (முகத்துவாரம்)	Tamil	
Negombo	Meegumuwa (මීගමුව)	Sinhala	
Negombo	Nirkolompu (நீர்கொழும்பு)	Tamil	
Point Pedro	Paruttittuṟai (பருத்தித்துறை)	Tamil	
Point Pedro	Pēduru Tuḍuva (පේදුරු තුඩුව)	Sinhala	
Pooneryn	Poonakary (பூநகரி)	Tamil	
Pooneryn	Pūneriya (පූනෙරිය)	Sinhala	
Trincomalee	Tirukōṇamalai (திருகோணமலை)	Tamil	
Trincomalee	Thrikunamalaya (ත්‍රිකුණාමළය)	Sinhala	

=== Sudan ===
Sudan As-Sūdān (السودان)
English name	Endonym		Notes
English name	Name	Language	Notes
Khartoum	Al-Khurṭūm (الخُرطوم)	Standard Arabic	
Khartoum	El-Khortūm (الخرطوم)	Sudanese Arabic	
Nile River	An-Nīl (النيل)	Standard Arabic	
Nile River	En-Nīl (النيل)	Sudanese Arabic	
Omdurman	Omm Dormān (أُم درمان)	Sudanese Arabic	
Omdurman	Umm Durmān (أُمّ دُرمان)	Standard Arabic	
Port Sudan	Būr Sūdan (بور سودان)	Standard Arabic	
Port Sudan	Bar'uut	Beja	

=== Sweden ===
Sweden Sverige
English name	Endonym		Notes
English name	Name	Language	Notes
Dalecarlia	Dalarna	Elfdalian	Latin name; Swedish name also used
Dalecarlia	Dalarna	Swedish	Latin name; Swedish name also used
Gothenburg	Göteborg	Swedish	
North Bothnia	Norrbotten	Swedish	Swedish name also used
Scania	Skåne	Swedish	Latin name
The Dales	Dalarna	Elfdalian	Obsolete; translation of Swedish name
The Dales	Dalarna	Swedish	Obsolete; translation of Swedish name
West Bothnia	Västerbotten	Swedish	Swedish name also used in English

=== Switzerland ===
Historically, English-language sources borrowed French-language names for some places in German-speaking Switzerland. This is no longer done, and many sources now use German names for most Swiss German-speaking places.

Switzerland Schweiz/ Suisse/ Svizzera/ Svizra
English name	Endonym		Notes
English name	Name	Language	Notes
Basle	Basel	Standard German	Obsolete
Berne	Bern	Standard German	Obsolete
Geneva	Genève	French	
Geneva	Genf	Standard German	
Lucerne	Luzern	Standard German	
Rhine River	Rhein	Standard German	
Valais	Wallis	Standard German	

=== Syria ===
Syria Sūrīyah (سورية)
English name	Endonym		Notes
English name	Name	Language	Notes
Aleppo	Ḥalab (حَلَب)	Standard Arabic	
Aleppo	Ḥalab (حَلَب)	Levantine Arabic	
Damascus	Dimashq (دِمَشْق)	Standard Arabic	
Damascus	Dimash' (دِمَشْق)	Levantine Arabic	
Euphrates River	Al-Furat (الفرات)	Standard Arabic	
Homs	Ḥimṣ (حِمْص)	Standard Arabic	
Homs	Ḥumṣ (حُمْص)	Levantine Arabic	
Palmyra	Tadmur (تَدْمُر)	Standard Arabic	
Palmyra	Tadmur (تَدْمُر)	Levantine Arabic	
Latakia	Al-Lādhiqīyah (اللاذقية)	Standard Arabic	
Latakia	El-Lādi'iyyeh (اللاذقية)	Levantine Arabic	

=== Thailand ===
Thailand was known as Siam in English until the Siamese revolution of 1932.

Thailand Prathet Thai (ประเทศไทย)
English name	Endonym		Notes
English name	Name	Language	Notes
Bangkok	Krung Thep (กรุงเทพ)	Thai	Bangkok was the name of a village built on the west bank of the Chao Phraya river before it grew and became the new capital of Siam, after the fall of Ayutthaya in 1767. The city is called Krung Thep among Thai citizens, but Bangkok among non-Thai citizens. The Thai government has attempted to change the official English name to Krung Thep, but the unofficial name of Bangkok remains in common use.
Junk Ceylon	Phuket (ภูเก็ต)	Thai	Obsolete; a corruption of the Malay Tanjung Salang
Kanburi	Kanchanaburi (กาญจนบุรี)	Thai	Obsolete
Menam	Maenam Chao Praya (แม่น้ำเจ้าพระยา)	Thai	Obsolete
Odia	Ayutthaya (อยุธยา)	Thai	Obsolete
Singora	Songkhla (สงขลา)	Thai	Obsolete
Zimme	Chiang Mai (เชียงใหม่)	Thai	Obsolete

=== Taiwan ===
The main island of Taiwan is also known in English as Formosa. All Chinese names below are written in traditional characters. As mentioned above in the China section, many place names in Taiwan use either pinyin or Wade-Giles.

Taiwan (臺灣)
English name	Endonym		Notes
English name	Name	Language	Notes
Pehoe	Phîⁿ-ô͘	Hokkien	
Pehoe	Penghu (澎湖)	Mandarin	Obsolete, from Min Nan name Phênô
Pescadores	Phîⁿ-ô͘	Hokkien	
Pescadores	Penghu (澎湖)	Mandarin	Dated, Portuguese name
Quemoy	Kimoi	Hokkien	
Quemoy	Kinmen (金門)	Mandarin	Possibly a Spanish or Portuguese transcription of the Zhengzhou Hokkien name for the city, Kim-mûi

=== Tunisia ===
Tunisia Tūnis (تونس)
English name	Endonym		Notes
English name	Name	Language	Notes
Sfax	Sifaks (ⵙⵉⴼⴰⴽⵙ)	Berber	
Sfax	Ṣfāqes (صفاقس)	Maghrebi Arabic	
Sfax	Ṣafaqis (صفاقس)	Standard Arabic	
Sousse	Susa	Berber	
Sousse	Sūseh (سوسة)	Maghrebi Arabic	
Sousse	Sūsah (سوسة)	Standard Arabic	

=== Turkey ===
Turkey Türkiye
English name	Endonym		Notes
English name	Name	Language	Notes
Adalia	Antalya	Turkish	Dated
Adrianople	Edirne	Turkish	Dated
Alexandretta	İskenderun	Turkish	Dated
Anemurium	Anamur	Turkish	Dated
Antioch	Antakya	Turkish	Dated
Bosphorus	Boǧaziçi	Turkish	
Byzantium	İstanbul	Turkish	Obsolete
Caeserea	Kayseri	Turkish	Dated
Cappadocia	Kapadokya	Turkish	
Claudiopolis	Mut	Turkish	Dated
Constantinople	İstanbul	Turkish	Dated
Dardanelles	Çanakkale Boǧazı	Turkish	
Edessa	(Sanlı)urfa	Turkish	Dated
Ephesus	Efes	Turkish	Dated
Euphrates River	Fırat	Turkish	
Gallipoli	Gelibolu	Turkish	Dated
Halicarnassus	Bodrum	Turkish	Dated
Heraclea Pontica	Karadeniz Ereǧli	Turkish	Dated
Iconium	Konya	Turkish	Dated
Imbros	Gökçeada	Turkish	Greek name
Istanbul	İstanbul	Turkish	Some consider Istanbul to be an English exonym of İstanbul. Normally spelled without İ in English, even in sources which would otherwise use it.
Kerasous	Giresun	Turkish	Dated
Laranda	Karaman	Turkish	Dated
Magnesia ad Sipylum	Manisa	Turkish	Dated
Nicaea	Iznik	Turkish	Dated
Nicomedia	Izmit	Turkish	Dated
Pergamon	Bergama	Turkish	Dated
Philadelphia	Alaşehir	Turkish	Dated
Prusa	Bursa	Turkish	Dated
Scutari	Üsküdar	Turkish	Dated
Seleucia	Silifke	Turkish	Dated
Smyrna	İzmir	Turkish	Dated
Tenedos	Bozcaada	Turkish	Greek name
Thrace	Trakya	Turkish	
Tigris River	Dicle	Turkish	
Tralles	Aydın	Turkish	Dated
Trebizond	Trabzon	Turkish	Dated

In June 2022, the United Nations agreed to change the country's official name in English as Türkiye at the request of the Turkish government. However, the majority of English speakers still refer to the country as Turkey in daily use.

=== Ukraine ===
Ukraine Ukrayina (Україна)
English name	Endonym		Notes
English name	Name	Language	Notes
Carpathian Ruthenia	Karpatska Rus' (Карпатська Русь)	Ukrainian	Historic region
Carpathian Ukraine	Karpatska Ukrayina (Карпатська Україна)	Ukrainian	Historic region
Chernobyl	Chornobyl (Чорнобиль)	Ukrainian	Russian name
Crimea	Krym (Крим)	Ukrainian	Region claimed by Russia, but many nations do not recognize it as part of Russia
Danube River	Dunai (Дунай)	Ukrainian	
Galicia	Halychyna (Галичина)	Ukrainian	Historic region
Gorlovka	Horlivka (Горлівка)	Ukrainian	Archaic, Russian name
Kharkov	Kharkiv (Харків)	Ukrainian	Archaic, Russian name
Kiev	Kyiv (Київ)	Ukrainian	Russian name; though the Russian endonym Kiev prevailed after the Soviet Union ended in 1991, in the late 2010s media outlets and governments began using Kyiv at the request of the Ukrainian government.
Krivoy Rog	Kryvyi Rih (Кривиі Ріг)	Ukrainian	Archaic, Russian name
Podolia	Podillia (Поділля)	Ukrainian	Historic region
Subcarpathia	Pidkarpattia (Підкарпаття)	Ukrainian	Historic region
Subcarpathian Ruthenia, Subcarpathian Rus	Pidkarpatska Rus' (Підкарпатська Русь)	Ukrainian	Historic region
Transcarpathia	Zakarpattia (Закарпаття)	Ukrainian	
Transcarpathian Ukraine	Zakarpatska Ukrayina (Закарпатська Україна)	Ukrainian	
Volhynia	Volyn' (Волинь)	Ukrainian	Historic region

=== Vietnam ===
All cities and towns are often spelled without diacritics and/or as a single word without spaces. Such names are not listed here.

Vietnam Việt Nam
English name	Endonym		Notes
English name	Name	Language	Notes
Annamite Range	Dãy Trường Sơn	Vietnamese	
Black River	Sông Đà	Vietnamese	
Faifo	Hội An	Vietnamese	Obsolete
Fansipan	Phan Xi Păng	Vietnamese	
Marble Mountains	Ngũ Hành Sơn	Vietnamese	Vietnamese name means "Five Elements Mountains"
Perfume River	Sông Hương	Vietnamese	Vietnamese name means "Fragrant River"
West Lake	Hồ Tây	Vietnamese	

=== Yemen ===
Yemen al-Yaman (ٱلْيَمَنْ)
English name	Endonym		Notes
English name	Name	Language	Notes
Socotra	Suquṭrá (سُقُطْرَىٰ)	Standard Arabic	
Socotra	Saqatri (ساقطري)	Soqotri	

== See also ==
- List of European exonyms
- List of European regions with alternative names
- List of European rivers with alternative names
- List of English exonyms for German toponyms—some no longer current
- List of renamed Indian public places—some without current acceptance
