= List of English translated personal names =

This is a list of personal names known in English that are modified from another language and are or were not used among the person themselves.

It does not include:

- names of historical monarchs (current and recent monarchs are rarely translated, e.g. Philip V of Spain but Felipe VI of Spain)
- commonly translated names of religious leaders (e.g. Pope Francis)
- aliases, pseudonyms, and stage names (such as the librettist Metastasio)
- latinized spellings of other languages and other spelling variants (such as removal/spelling out of diacritics, e.g. Arnold Schoenberg, born Arnold Schönberg, US citizen in 1941))
- permanent name changes, colloquially known as "Ellis Island Specials" (such as George Frideric Handel born Georg Friedrich Händel, naturalised British subject in 1727; Sumner Redstone, legally translated his originally German/Yiddish surname Rothstein along with the rest of his family in 1940)

This list also includes names from non-English languages the individual did not use, such as Latin or French.

Modern convention is not to translate modern personal names.

== Translated names currently used ==
English name	Original name	Language	Notability	Notes
Alexander Agricola	Alexander Ackerman	Dutch	Artist (musician)	
Averroes	Muḥammad Ibn-'Aḥmad Ibn-Rushd	Arabic	Intellectual (philosopher)	
Avicenna	'Ali Ibn Al-Ḥusayn Ibn-'Abdillāh Ibn-Ḥasan Ibn-Sīnā	Arabic	Intellectual (philosopher)	
Bill Alexander	Wilhelm Alexander	German	Artist (painter)	Self-translated
Catiline	Lucius Sergius Catilina	Latin	Political leader	
Christopher Columbus	Cristóbal Colón	Spanish	Explorer	
Christopher Columbus	Cristoffa Corombo	Ligurian	Explorer	
Claudius Salmasius	Claude Saumise	French	Intellectual	
Clovis I	Chlodovechus	Latin	Political leader	
Clovis I	Hlōdowig	Frankish	Political leader	
Confucius	Kǒng Qiū (孔丘)	Mandarin	Intellectual (philosopher)	Birth name, no longer used
Confucius	Kǒng Fūzǐ (孔夫子)	Mandarin	Intellectual (philosopher)	
Cornplanter	Gaiänt'wakê	Seneca	Political leader	
Cornplanter	John Abeel III	English	Political leader	Birth name, no longer used
Denis the Carthusian	Denys van Leeuwen	Dutch	Religious figure	
Ferdinand Magellan	Fernão de Magalhães	Portuguese	Explorer	
Ferenc Dávid	Franz David Hertel	German	Religious figure	Hungarian and German names were both in use
George Santayana	Jorge Agustín Nicolás Ruiz de Santayana	Spanish	Intellectual (philosopher)	Self-translated
Georgius Agricola	Georg Pawer	German	Intellectual (scientist)	
Gerardus Mercator	Gheert Cremer	Dutch	Intellectual (philosopher)	
Hector Boyardee	Ettore Boiardi	Italian	Chef	
Henry of Ghent	Henri de Gand	French	Intellectual (philosopher)	
Henry of Ghent	Henricus Gadavensus	Latin	Intellectual (philosopher)	
Hieronymous Bosch	Jheronimus Bosch	Dutch	Artist (painter)	
Homer	Hómēros (Ὅμηρος)	Ancient Greek	Artist (poet)	
Horace	Quintus Horatius Flaccus	Latin	Artist (poet)	
Hugo Etherianis	Ugo Eteriano	Italian	Religious figure	
Hugo Grotius	Huig de Groot	Dutch	Intellectual	
Ignatius of Loyola	Ignacio de Loyola	Spanish	Religious figure (saint)	
Jacobus Arminius	Jacob Hermanszoon	Dutch	Religious figure	
Jerome	Eusebius Sophronius Hieronymus	Latin	Theologian	
Jesus	Iēsoûs (Ἰησοῦς)	Koine Greek	Religious figure	
John Amos Comenius	Jan Amos Komenský	Czech	Intellectual (philosopher) Religious figure	
John Cabot	Zuan Chabotto	Venetian	Explorer	
John Calvin	Jehan Cauvin	French	Religious figure (reformer)	
John Huss	Jan Hus	Czech	Religious figure (reformer)	
John of Damascus	Yuḥannā Ad-Dimashqi (يوحنا الدمشقي,)	Arabic	Religious figure (saint)	
Josephus	Titus Flavius Josephus	Latin	Intellectual (philosopher)	Full Latin name.
Josephus	Yosef Ben-Matityahu (יוסף בן מתתיהו)	Hebrew	Intellectual (philosopher)	
Lee Iacocca	Lido Iacocca	Italian	Businessman	Other members of the Iacocca family used a different English adaptation, Yocco.
Livy	Titus Livius Patavinus	Latin	Intellectual (historian)	
Julius Evola	Giulio Cesare Andrea baron Evola	Italian	Intellectual (philosopher) Religious figure (mystic)	
Maimonides	Moses Maimonides	Latin	Intellectual (philosopher)	
Maimonides	Moshe Ben-Maymon (משה בן מימון)	Hebrew	Intellectual (philosopher)	
Maimonides	Mūsa Ibn-Maymūn (موسى بن ميمون)	Arabic	Intellectual (philosopher)	
Mark Antony	Marcus Antonius	Latin	Political leader	
Mencius	Mèng Kē (孟軻)	Mandarin	Intellectual (philosopher)	Birth name, no longer used
Mencius	Mèngzī (孟子)	Mandarin	Intellectual (philosopher)	
Michael Servetus	Miguel Serveto	Spanish	Intellectual (scientist)	
Moses	Mōše (מֹשֶׁה)	Biblical Hebrew	Religious figure (prophet)	
Muhammad ibn Abdullah	Muḥammad ibn ʿAbd Allāh (مُحَمَّد ٱبن عَبْد ٱللَّٰه)	Arabic	Religious figure (prophet)	
Nachmanides	Bonastruc ça Porta	Catalan	Intellectual (philosopher) Religious figure	
Nachmanides	Moshe Ben-Nachman (משה בן נחמן)	Hebrew	Intellectual (philosopher) Religious figure	
Nicolas Steno	Nicolas Stenonis	Latin	Intellectual (scientist) Religious figure	
Nicolas Steno	Niels Steensen	Danish	Intellectual (scientist) Religious figure	
Nicolaus Copernicus	Niklas Koppernigk	German	Intellectual (scientist)	
Nicolaus Copernicus	Mikołaj Kopernik	Polish	Intellectual (scientist)	
Nostradamus	Michel de Nostredame	French	Intellectual	
Octavian	Gaius Julius Caesar Octavianus	Latin	Roman emperor	
Ovid	Publius Ovidius Naso	Latin	Artist (poet)	
Patricia Palinkas	Patric Barczi	Hungarian	Athlete (American football player)	Palinkas was her married name. Her maiden name has also been simplified to Barzi.
Paul of Venice	Paolo da Veneto	Italian	Intellectual (philosopher)	
Paul of Venice	Paolo Nicoletto	Italian	Intellectual (philosopher)	Birth name, no longer used
Paul of Venice	Paulus Venetus	Latin	Intellectual (philosopher)	
Pete Fountain	Pierre LaFontaine, Jr.	French	Artist (musician)	
Peter Damian	Pietro Damiani	Italian	Religious figure (saint)	
Peter Lombard	Pietro Lombardo	Italian	Intellectual (philosopher)	
Peter of Bruys	Pierre de Bruys	French	Religious figure (priest)	
Peter of Ravenna	Pietro de Ravenna	Italian	Intellectual	
Peter Waldo	Pierre Vaudès	French	Religious figure	
Petrarch	Francesco Petracco	Italian	Artist (poet) Intellectual	
Petrarch	Franciscus Petrarca	Latin	Artist (poet) Intellectual	
Petrus Apianis	Peter Bienewitz	German	Intellectual (scientist)	
Plato	Plátōn	Ancient Greek	Philosopher	
Pompey	Gnaeus Pompeius Magnus	Latin	Political leader	
Raphael	Raffaello Sanzio	Italian	Artist	
Regiomontanus	Johannes Müller von Königsberg	German	Intellectual (scientist)	
Rodolphus Agricola	Roelof Huysman	Dutch	Intellectual	
Samuel Maresius	Samuel Des Marets	French	Intellectual	
Terence	Publius Terentius Afer	Latin	Artist (playwright)	
Theodore Beza	Théodore de Bèze	French	Religious figure	
Thomas Aquinas	Tommaso d'Aquino	Italian	Intellectual (philosopher) Religious figure (saint)	
Thomas à Kempis	Thomas Hammerlein	German	Intellectual (philosopher) Religious figure	Birth name, no longer used
Thomas à Kempis	Thomas Hemerkin	Dutch	Intellectual (philosopher) Religious figure	Birth name, no longer used
Thomas à Kempis	Thomas van Kempen	Dutch	Intellectual (philosopher) Religious figure	
Thomas à Kempis	Thomas von Kempen	German	Intellectual (philosopher) Religious figure	
Titian	Tiziano Vecelli	Italian	Artist	
Tycho Brahe	Tyge Brahe	Danish	Intellectual (scientist)	
Virgil	Publius Vergilius Maro	Latin	Artist (poet)	
William of Salicet	Guglielmo da Saliceto	Italian	Intellectual (scientist)	
William Fox	Wilmos Fuchs	Hungarian	Businessman	
Zoroaster	Zarathustra	Avestan	Prophet	

== See also ==
- List of Latinised names
