= Milton, Pennsylvania =

Borough in Pennsylvania, US

- Borough
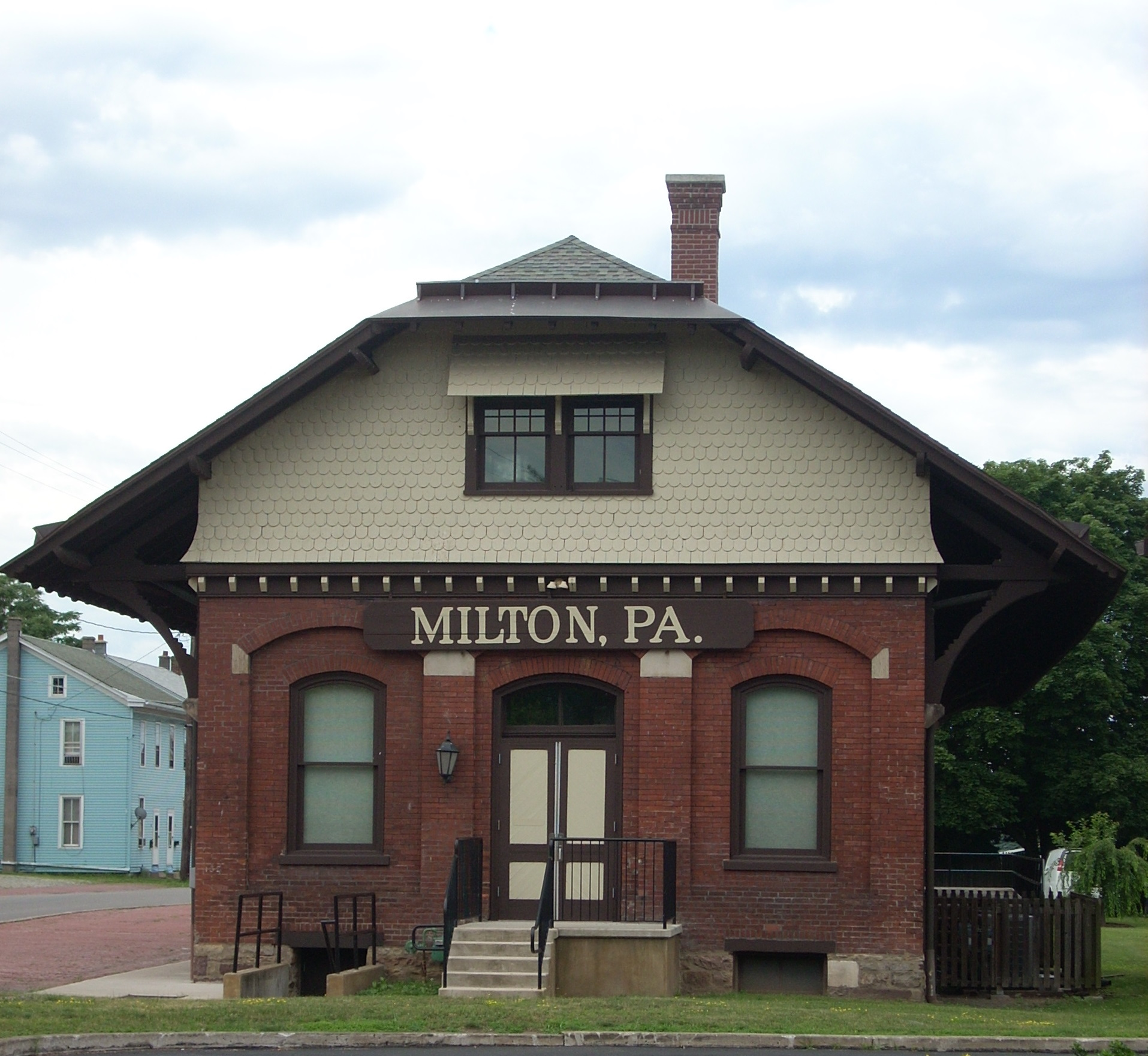
- Milton's old railroad depot and current borough office.

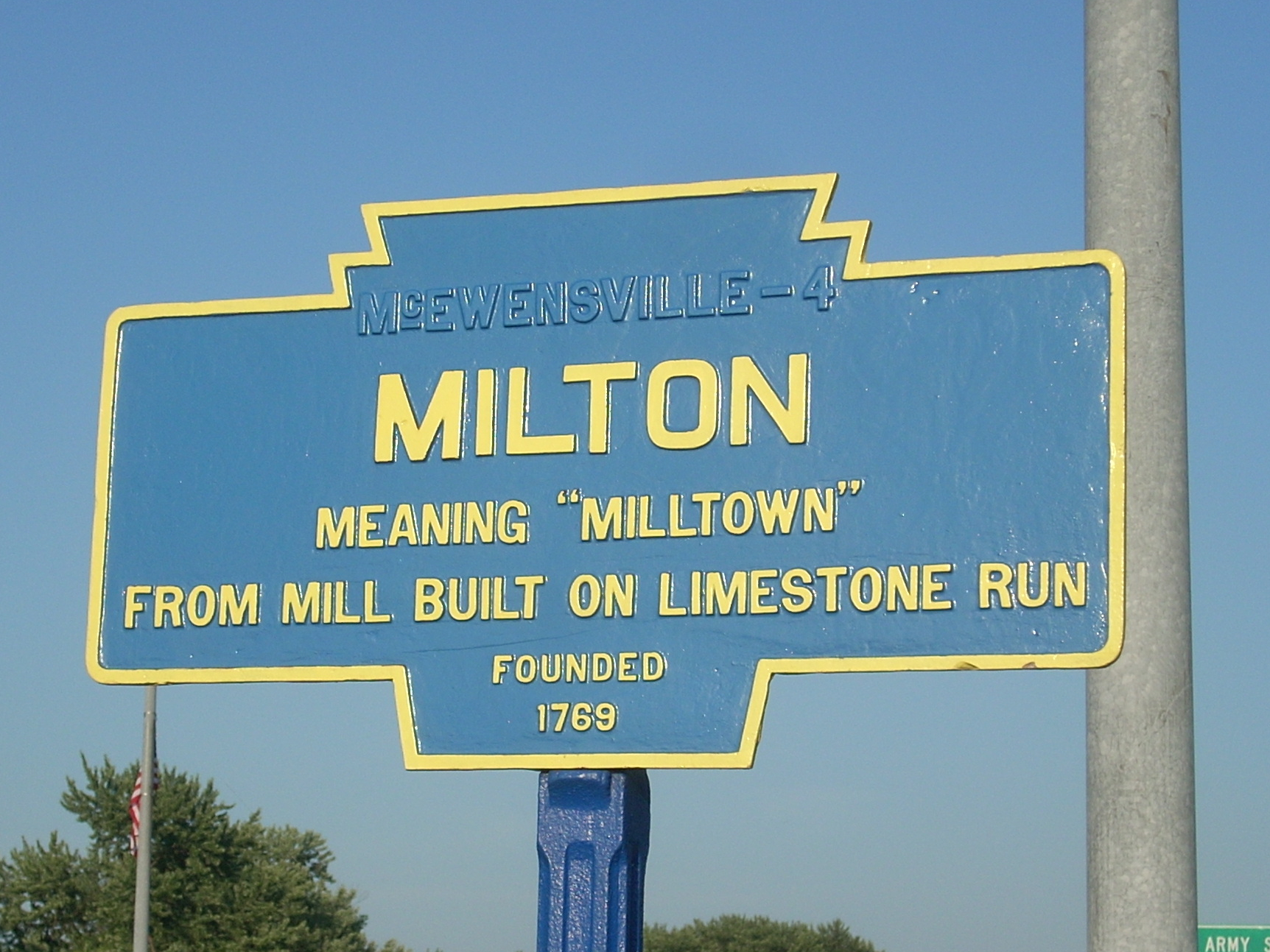
- Keystone marker

- Location of Milton in Northumberland County, Pennsylvania.

- Location within the U.S. state of Pennsylvania Milton (the United States)
- Coordinates: 41°00′43″N 76°51′15″W
- Country: United States
- State: Pennsylvania
- County: Northumberland
- Settled: 1770
- Incorporated (borough): 1817

Government
  - Mayor: Tom Aber

Area
  - Total: 3.77 sq mi (9.77 km^{2})
  - Land: 3.47 sq mi (8.98 km^{2})
  - Water: 0.30 sq mi (0.78 km^{2})
- Elevation (borough benchmark): 472 ft (144 m)
- Highest elevation (eastern boundary of borough): 570 ft (170 m)
- Lowest elevation (West Branch Susquehanna River): 435 ft (133 m)

Population (2020)
  - Total: 6,609
  - Density: 1,905/sq mi (735.6/km^{2})
- Time zone: Eastern (EST)
  - Summer (DST): EDT
- ZIP code: 17847
- Area codes: 570 and 272
- FIPS code: 42-50016
- Website: www.miltonpa.org

Milton is a borough in Northumberland County, Pennsylvania, United States, on the West Branch Susquehanna River, 50 miles (80 km) north of Harrisburg, located in Central Pennsylvania's Susquehanna River Valley. As of the 2020 census, Milton had a population of 6,609. It is approximately 10 miles (16 km) upriver from the mouth of the West Branch Susquehanna River and about 30 miles (48 km) downriver of Williamsport.

== History ==
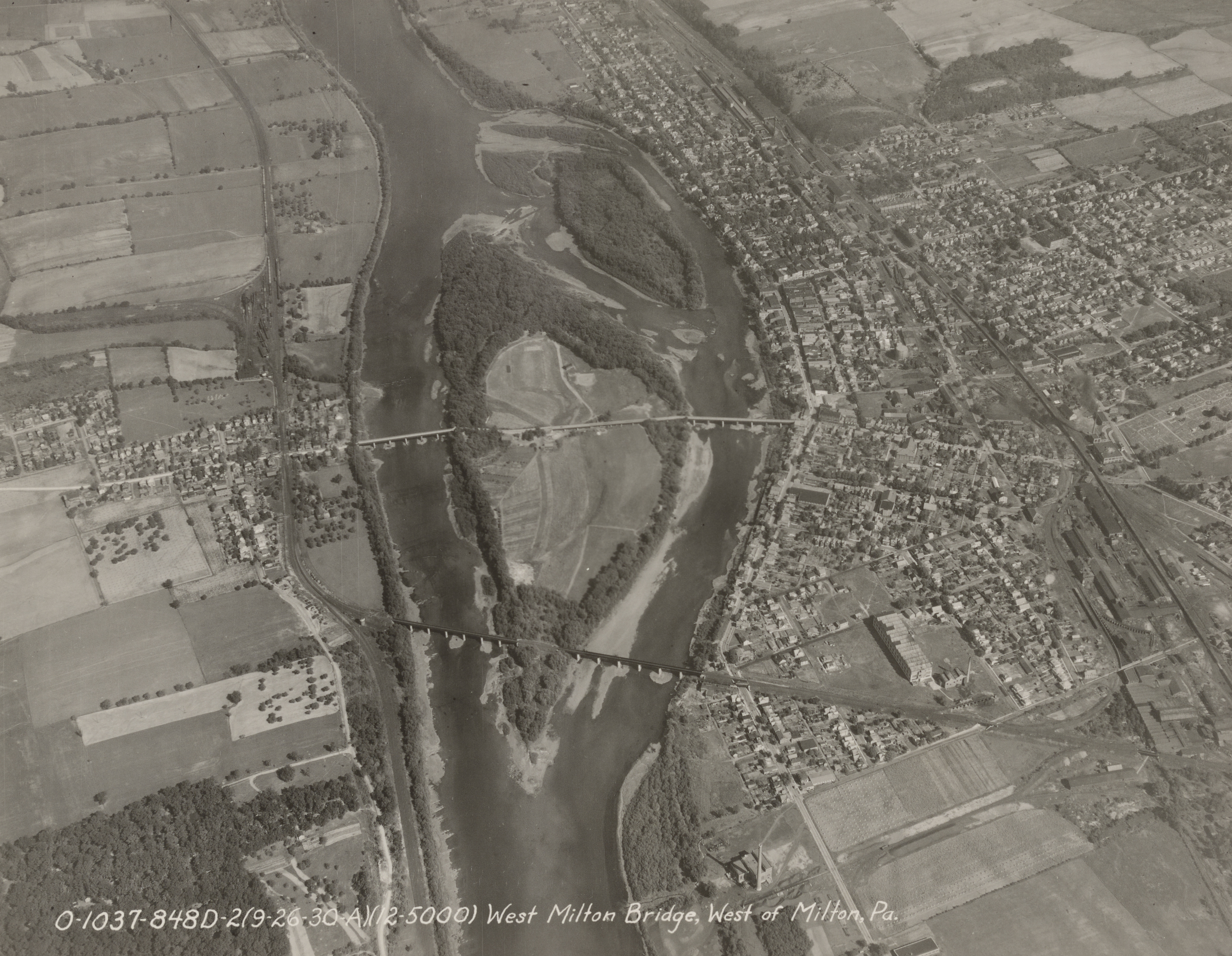
Milton in 1930

Settled in 1770, Milton was incorporated in 1817, and is governed by a charter that was revised in 1890. Formerly, its extensive manufacturing plants included car and woodworking machinery shops; rolling, flour, knitting, planing, and saw mills; washer, nut, and bolt works; and furniture, shoe, couch, nail, fly net, bamboo novelty, and paper-box factories. In 1900, 6,175 people lived in Milton. In 1940, 8,313 people lived there. The population was 6,650 at the 2000 census, and 7,042 at the 2010 census.

The Milton Historic District, Pennsylvania Canal and Limestone Run Aqueduct, Milton Armory, and Milton Freight Station are listed on the National Register of Historic Places.

=== Industry ===
At the turn of the 20th century, several industrial and manufacturing companies were located within the borough. The six principal industries were Samuel J. Shimer & Sons, the Milton Manufacturing Company, the American Car and Foundry Company, the F.A. Godcharles Company, the Sydney H. Souter Silk Company, and the West Branch Novelty Company. Many smaller businesses flourished in parallel with the large manufacturing companies during this early period, which made the borough an industrial center in the region at the time.

The original Chef Boyardee factory was located here and Conagra Foods operates a factory in the borough which produces Chef Boyardee products.

== Geography ==
Milton is located at 41°1′3″N 76°51′3″W (41.017413, -76.850758). According to the United States Census Bureau, the borough has a total area of 3.8 square miles (9.8 km^{2}), of which, 3.5 square miles (9.1 km^{2}) is land and 0.3 square miles (0.78 km^{2}) (7.73%) is water.

Milton's terrain is mostly flat, with some scattered hills. The borough is home to the Milton State Park, and is served by state routes 254, 405 and 642.

== Demographics ==
Historical population
Census	Pop.	Note	%±
1820	1,016		—
1830	1,270		25.0%
1840	1,508		18.7%
1850	1,649		9.4%
1860	1,702		3.2%
1870	1,909		12.2%
1880	2,102		10.1%
1890	5,317		152.9%
1900	6,175		16.1%
1910	7,460		20.8%
1920	8,638		15.8%
1930	8,552		−1.0%
1940	8,313		−2.8%
1950	8,578		3.2%
1960	7,972		−7.1%
1970	7,723		−3.1%
1980	6,730		−12.9%
1990	6,746		0.2%
2000	6,650		−1.4%
2010	7,042		5.9%
2020	6,609		−6.1%

As of the census of 2000, 6,650 people, 2,762 households, and 1,748 families resided in the borough. The population density was 1,922.6 inhabitants per square mile (742.3/km^{2}). The 3,000 housing units averaged 867.3 per square mile (334.8/km^{2}). The racial makeup of the borough was 94.81% White, 2.38% African American, 0.12% Native American, 0.21% Asian, 0.95% from other races, and 1.53% from two or more races. Hispanics or Latinos of any race were 2.17% of the population.

=== 2010 Census ===
As of 2010, the 7,042 people populating the borough were 88.4% White, 4.5% African American, and 6.2% Hispanic. The community has a growing Puerto Rican population. The Hispanic population has tripled since the 2000 census.

Of the 2,762 households, 29.9% had children under the age of 18 living with them, 48.3% were married couples living together, 10.9% had a female householder with no husband present, and 36.7% were not families. About 32.6% of all households were made up of individuals, and 15.3% had someone living alone who was 65 years of age or older. The average household size was 2.29, and the average family size was 2.89.

In the borough, the population was distributed as 23.7% under the age of 18, 7.2% from 18 to 24, 27.6% from 25 to 44, 22.6% from 45 to 64, and 18.9% who were 65 years of age or older. The median age was 39 years. For every 100 females, there were 88.7 males. For every 100 females age 18 and over, there were 84.2 males.

The median income for a household in the borough was $30,252, and for a family was $38,438. Males had a median income of $30,636 versus $21,384 for females. The per capita income for the borough was $16,980. About 10.6% of families and 13.5% of the population were below the poverty line, including 19.0% of those under age 18 and 13.1% of those age 65 or over.

== Education ==
The school district is Milton Area School District.

== Notable people ==
- Phil Auten (1840–1919) – business executive and co-owner of the Pittsburgh Pirates
- Ettore Boiardi (1897–1985) – known for his brand of food products, named Chef Boyardee
- James Curtis Hepburn (1815–1911) – missionary and linguist; deviser of the Hepburn system for writing Japanese in Roman characters
- George Theodore Hyatt (1830–1900) – Medal of Honor awardee for gallantry during the U.S. Civil War
- Fay Kellogg (1871–1918) – architect in the early 20th century
- Lew McCarty (1888–1930) – professional baseball player who played catcher for the Brooklyn Superbas/Robins, New York Giants and St. Louis Cardinals
- James Pollock (1810–1890) – congressman, Governor of Pennsylvania, director of the Philadelphia Mint; buried in Milton Cemetery
- Christian Markle Straub (1804–1860) – U.S. Representative for Pennsylvania's 11th congressional district from 1853 to 1855
