= Dokdo (disambiguation) =

Dokdo (독도) is the Korean name for the Liancourt Rocks.

Dokdo may also refer to:

- Dokdo (currency), the former currency of Kutch, India
- Dokdo class amphibious assault ship and its lead ship

== See also ==
- Takeshima (disambiguation), Japanese name of the island
