= Milton Historic District (Milton, Pennsylvania) =

Historic district in Pennsylvania, United States

- U.S. National Register of Historic Places
- U.S. Historic district
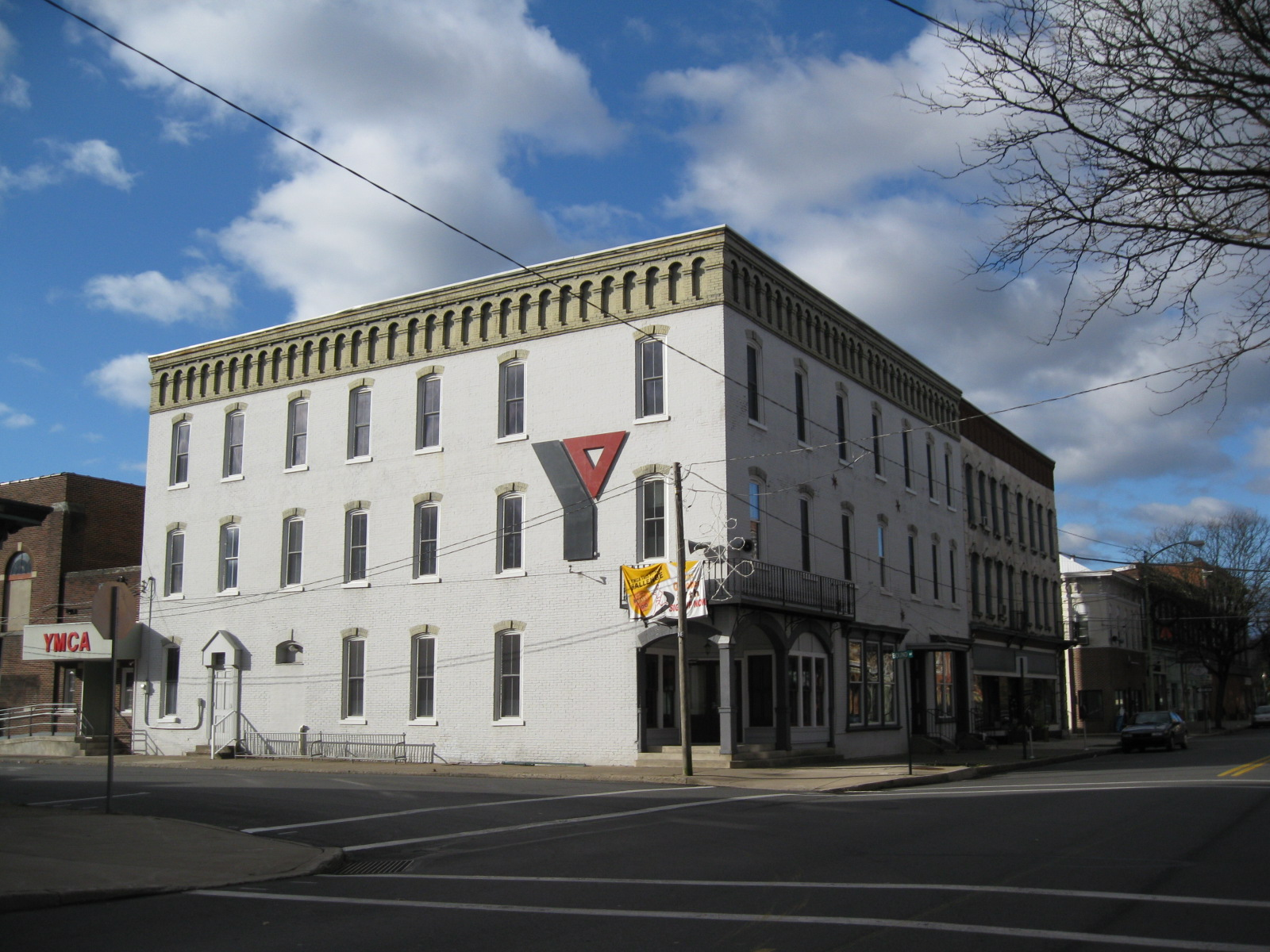
- YMCA in Milton Historic District, November 2009

- Location within Pennsylvania Location within the United States
- Location: Roughly bounded by Eight and Upper Market Sts., Spruce Ave. and Stanton, High and Apple Sts., and the Susquehanna River, Milton, Pennsylvania
- Coordinates: 41°01′20″N 76°50′59″W
- Area: 101 acres (41 ha)
- Built: 1852
- Architect: Nesbit, John; Et al.
- Architectural style: Colonial Revival, Bungalow/craftsman, Late Victorian
- NRHP reference No.: 86001933
- Added to NRHP: July 24, 1986

The Milton Historic District is a national historic district that is located in Milton, Northumberland County, Pennsylvania.

It was added to the National Register of Historic Places in 1986.

== History and architectural features ==
This historic district encompasses 719 contributing buildings that are located in the central business district and surrounding residential areas of Milton.

The buildings mostly date from the 1880s to the early twentieth century; older buildings were largely lost due to a fire in 1880 and floods in 1972 and 1977. Residential buildings were designed in a variety of architectural styles including Colonial Revival, Bungalow / American Craftsman, Queen Anne, and Richardsonian Romanesque.

Notable buildings include two surviving Federal style stone houses at 355 S. Front and 37 W. 4th, the Methodist Episcopal Church (1882), the First Presbyterian Church (1882), the Hotel Milton, a former Elk's Home, the Sears Roebuck Building, a former Dreifuss Brothers Store, the Stetler Hotel, the Milton Water Company Building (1890), the Milton National Bank/Public Library, the Masonic Temple (1930), the U.S. Post Office, a former Shimer Corporation works, the Pennsylvania and Reading Freight Station, the YMCA building, and the Reid Tobacco Company building.

It was added to the National Register of Historic Places in 1986.

== Gallery ==
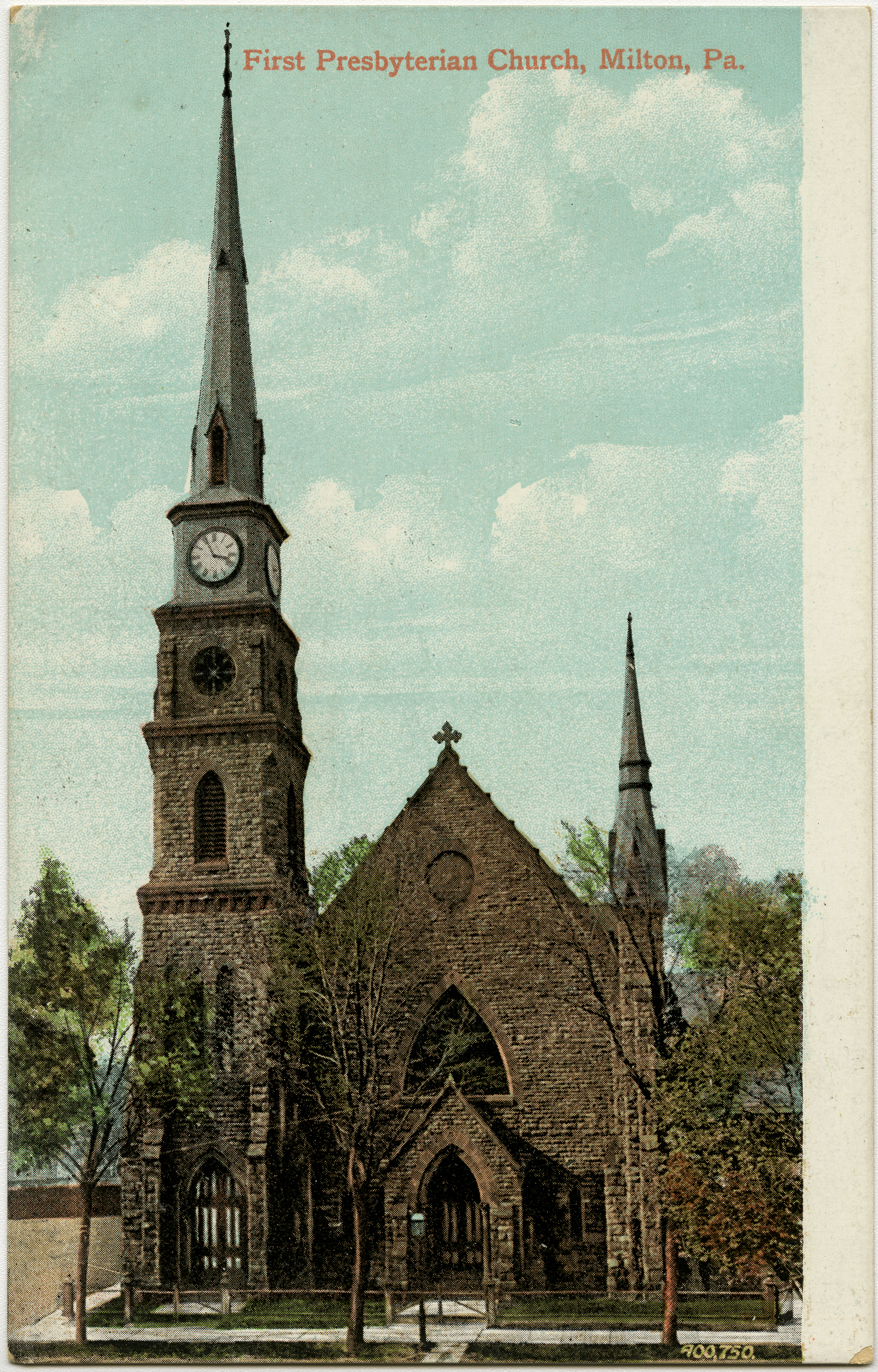
First Presbyterian Church

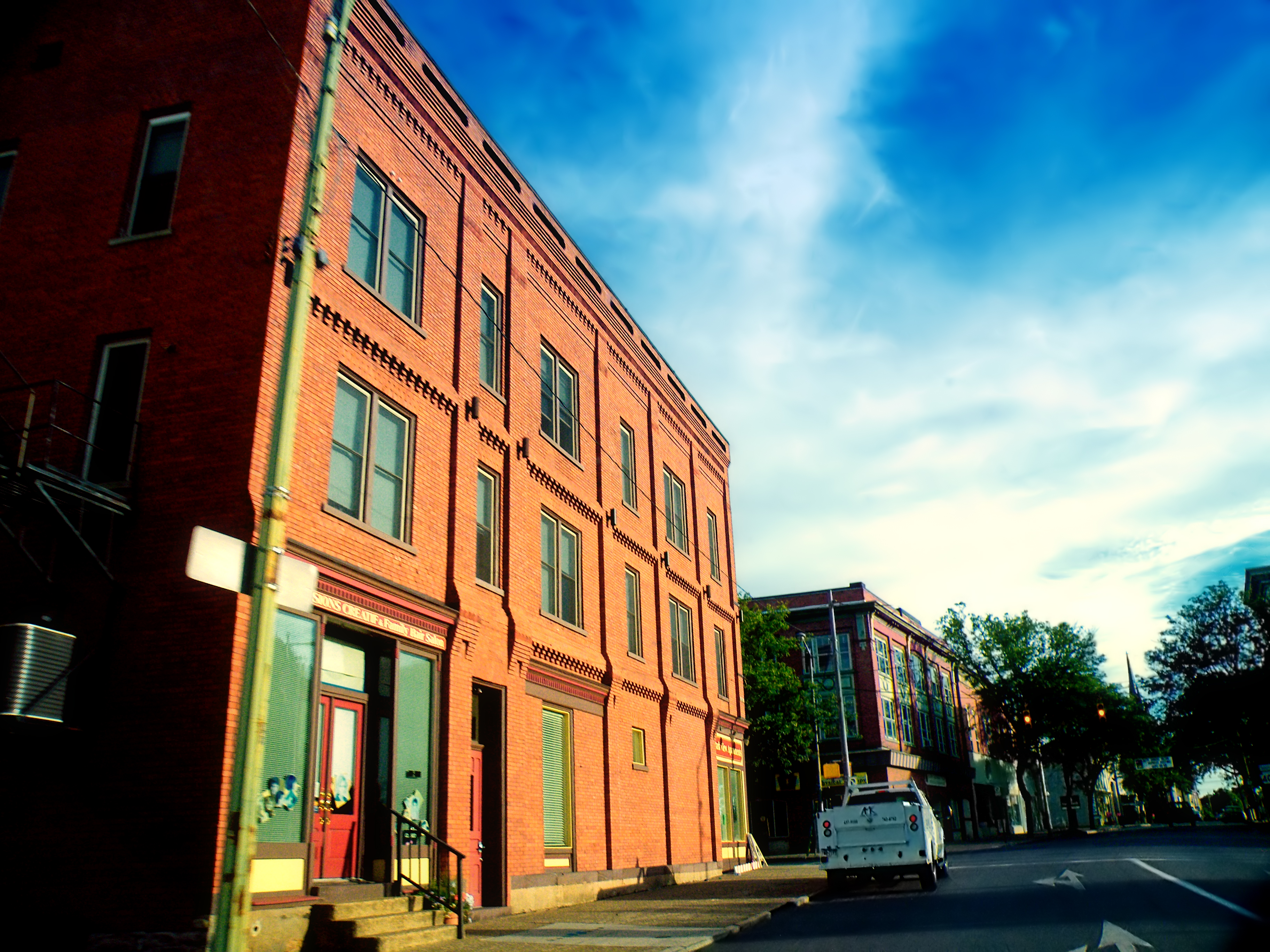
Downtown

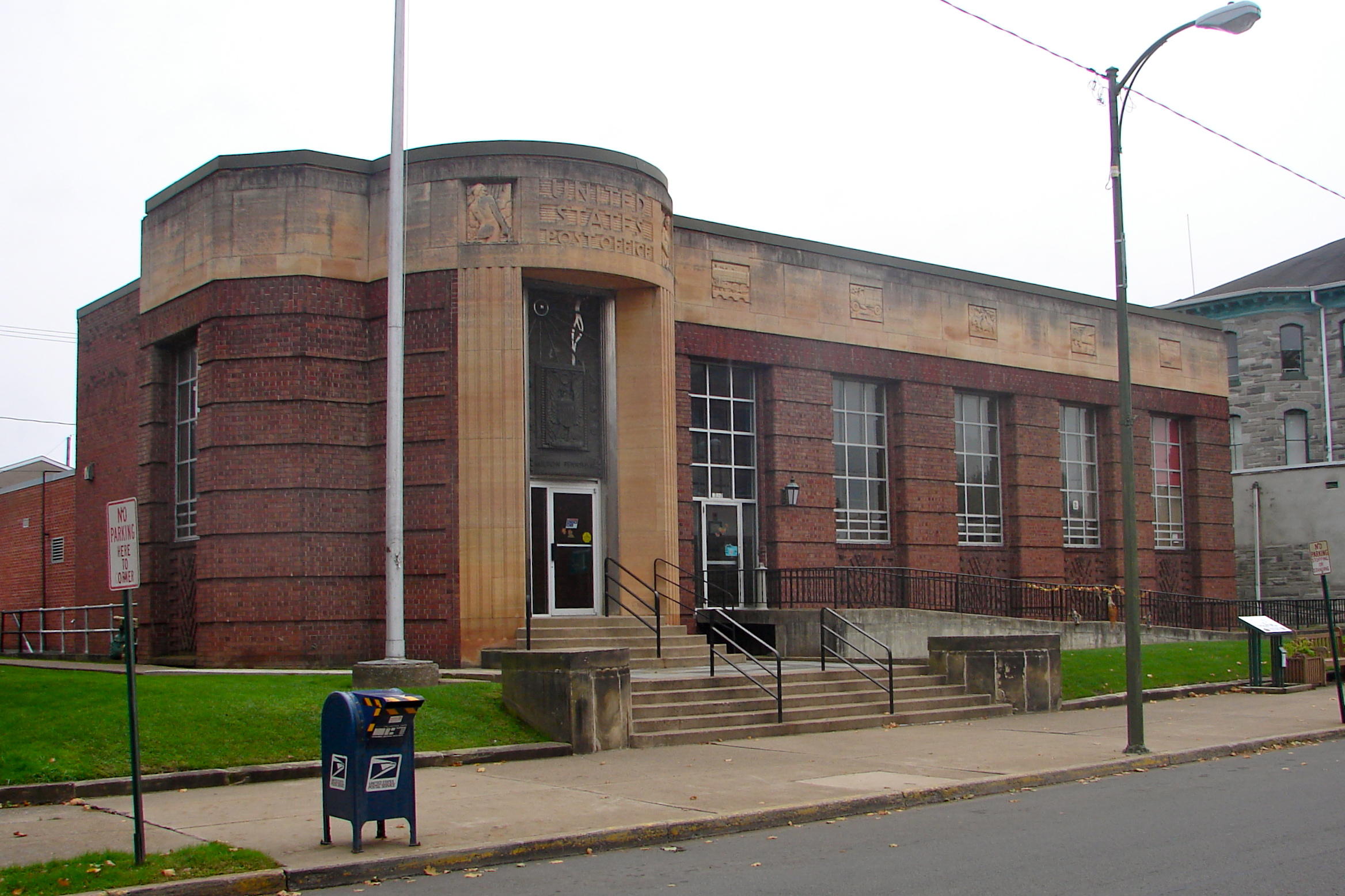
Milton Post Office, October 2011

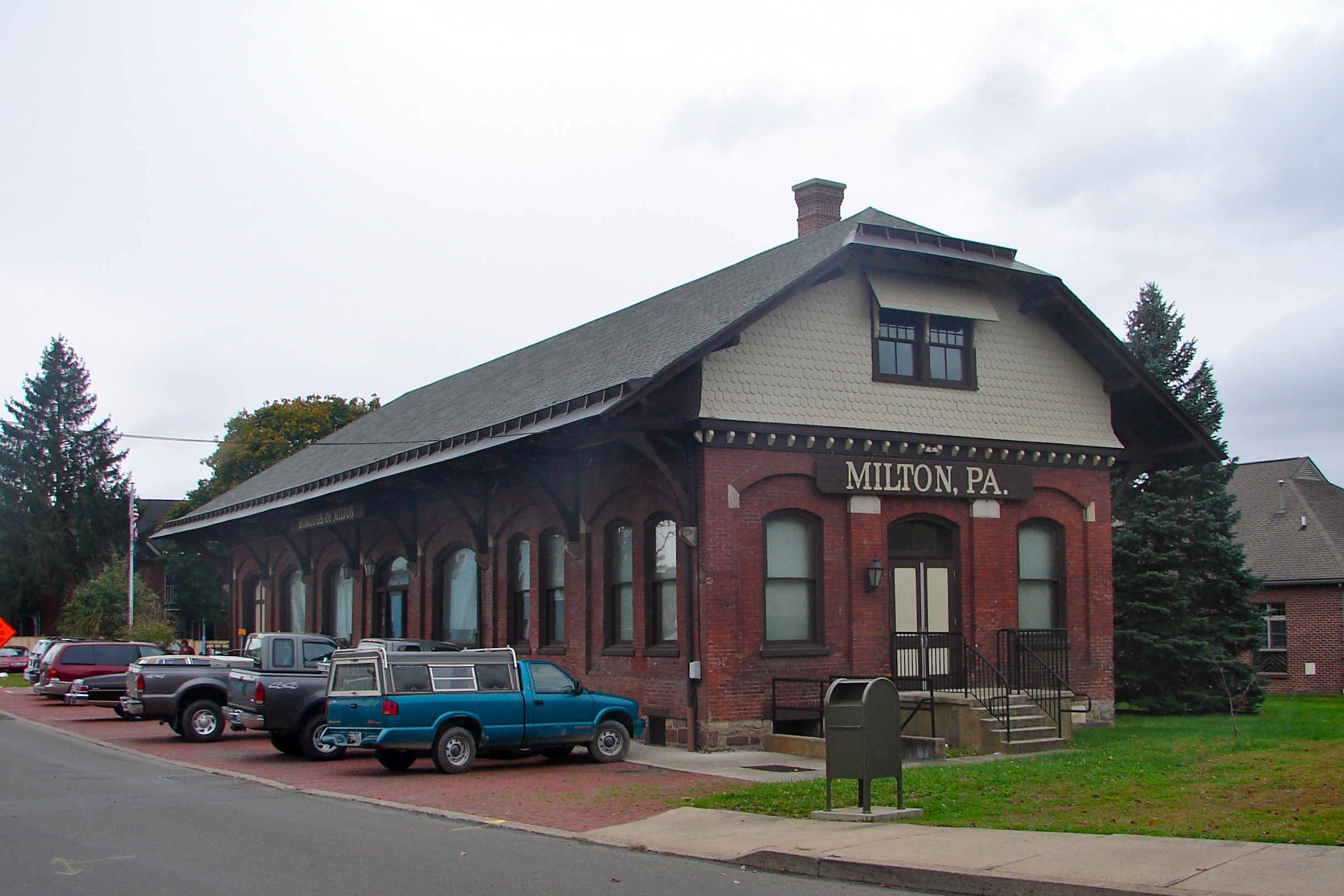
Milton Freight Station

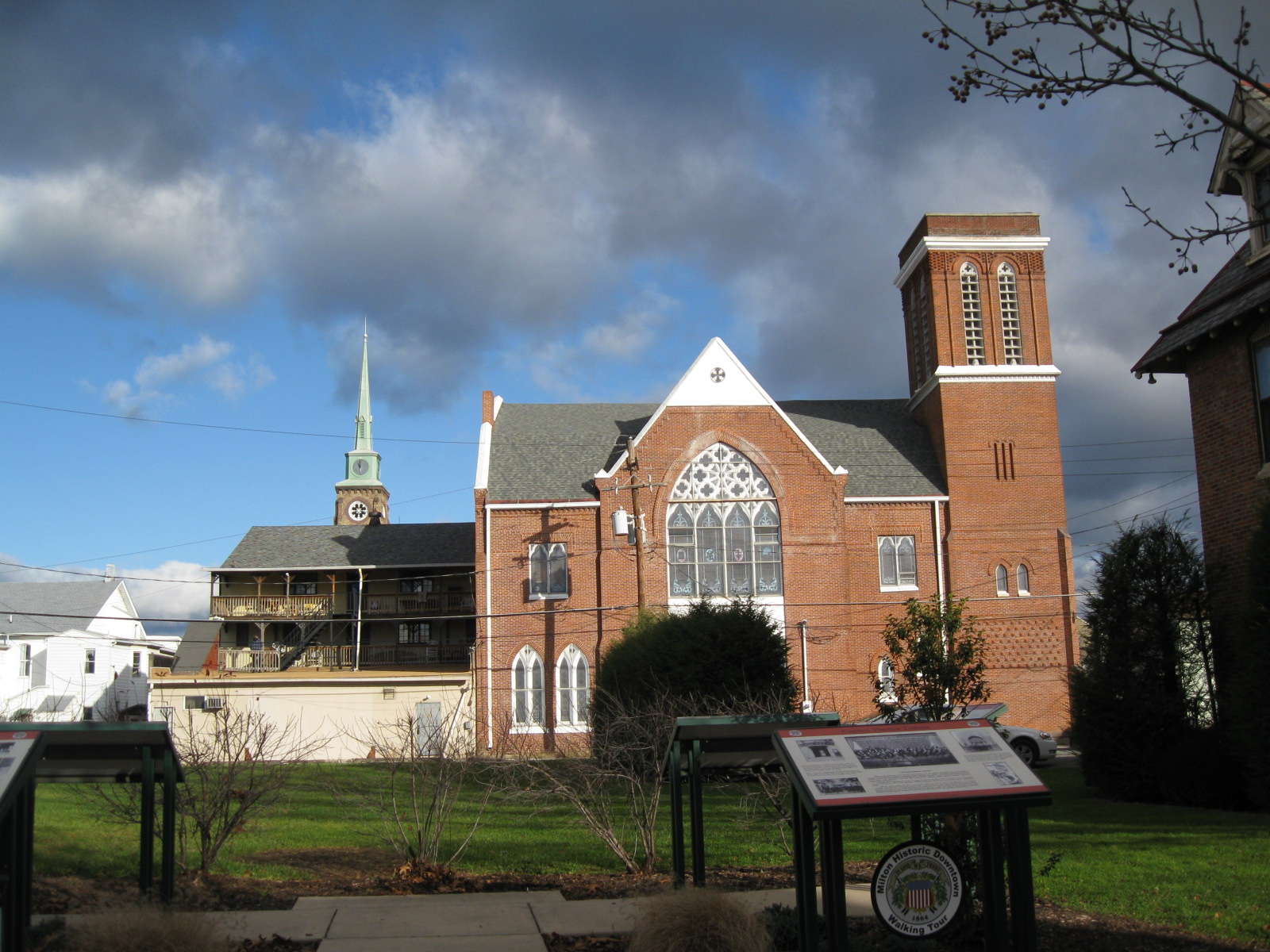
Methodist church

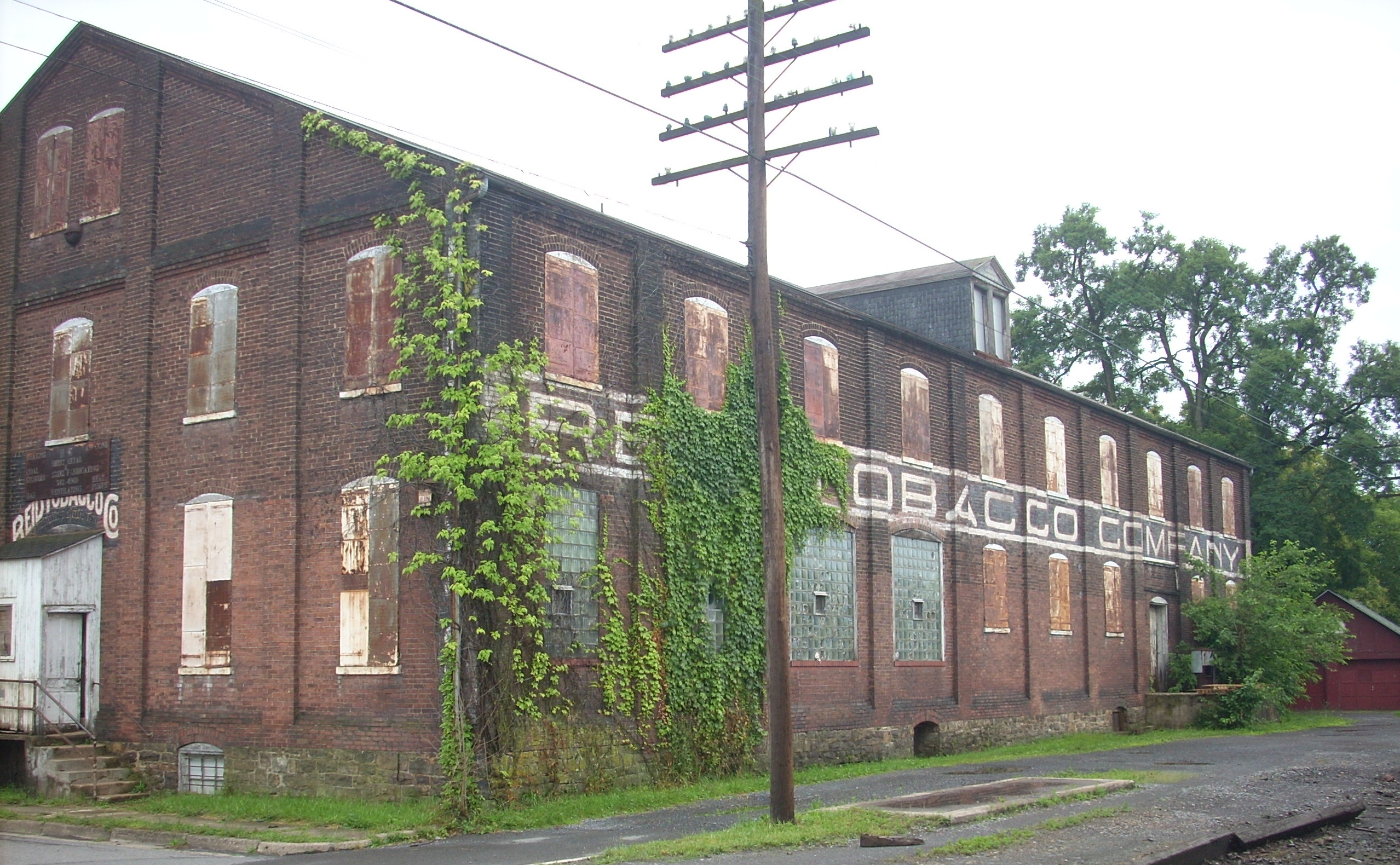
Reid Tobacco Company
