= Milton Freight Station =

Historic freight station in Milton, Pennsylvania

- U.S. National Register of Historic Places
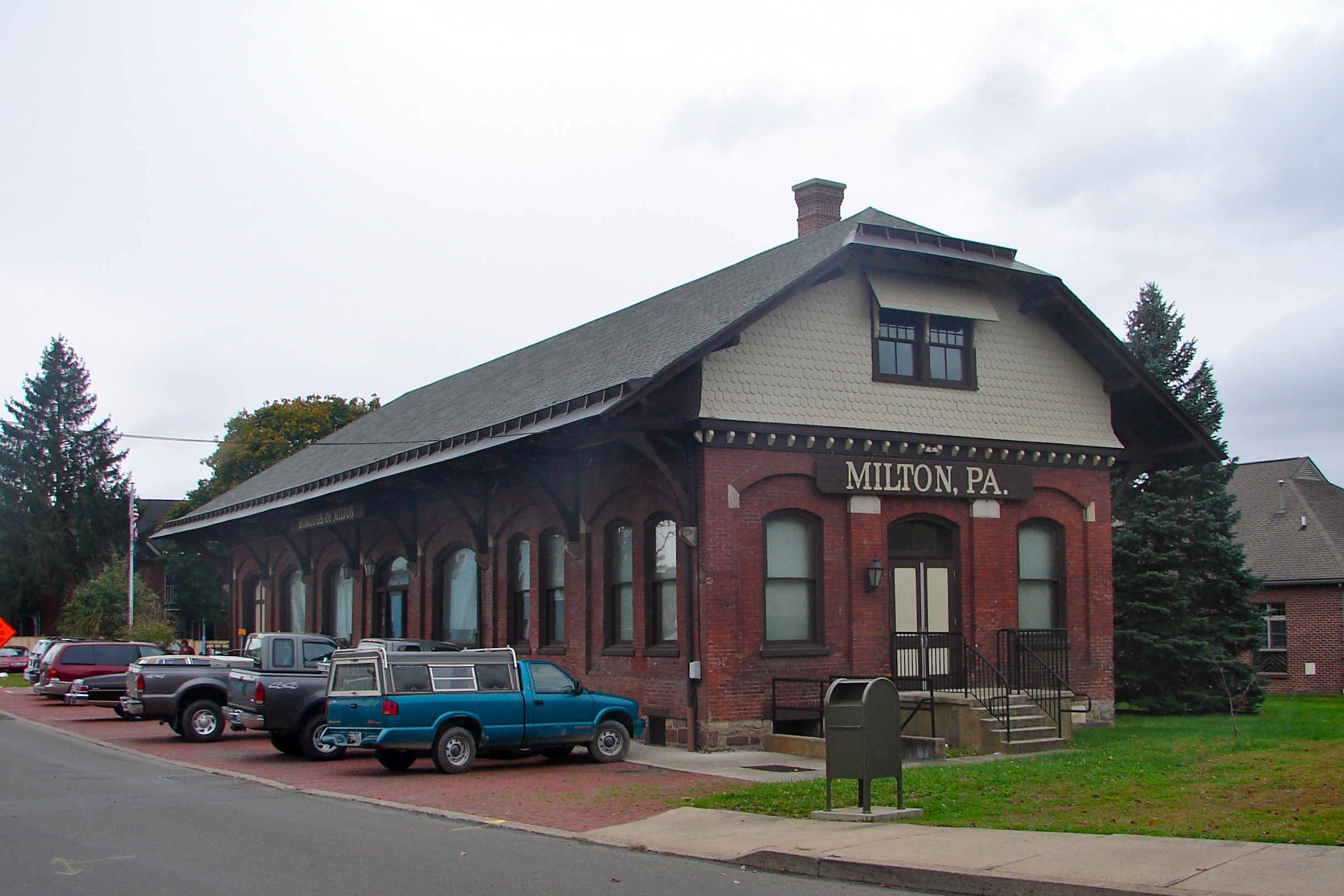
- Milton Freight Station, October 2011

- Location within Pennsylvania Location within the United States
- Location: 90 Broadway, Milton, Pennsylvania
- Coordinates: 41°1′10″N 76°51′8″W
- Area: 0.5 acres (0.20 ha)
- Built: 1883
- Built by: Philadelphia & Reading Railroad Co.; Nesbit, Joseph
- NRHP reference No.: 77001180
- Added to NRHP: April 13, 1977

The Milton Freight Station is an historic freight station in Milton, Northumberland County, Pennsylvania, United States. It was built by the Philadelphia & Reading Railroad in 1883.

It was added to the National Register of Historic Places in 1977. It is located in the Milton Historic District.

== History and architectural features ==
This historic train station is a one-story, brick building that measures thirty feet by one hundred feet, with a twenty-foot-long platform located at the southern end. It sits on a stone foundation and has a gable roof. The building houses borough offices.
