= Takeshima (disambiguation) =

Takeshima (竹島) is the Japanese name for the Liancourt Rocks.

Takeshima may also refer to:

== Places ==
- Takeshima (Shiga), an island within Lake Biwa, part of Shiga Prefecture, Japan
- Takeshima (Kagoshima), one of the Ryukyu Islands just south of Kyushu, part of Kagoshima Prefecture, Japan
- Eten Island in Chuuk Atoll, known to the Japanese as Takeshima

== People ==
- Hiroshi Takeshima, an enka singer
- Toshifumi Takeshima, an Akita Television announcer
- Yumiko Takeshima, a Japanese designer and ballet dancer

== See also ==
- Dokdo (disambiguation), Korean name of the island
