= Chef Boyardee =

Canned pasta brand

- Product type: Canned pasta products
- Current owner: Hometown Food Company
- Country: United States
- Introduced: 1928; 98 years ago
- Website: chefboyardee.com

Chef Boyardee is an American brand of canned pasta products owned by Hometown Food Company. The company was founded by Italian immigrant Ettore Boiardi in Cleveland, Ohio, in 1928.

== History ==
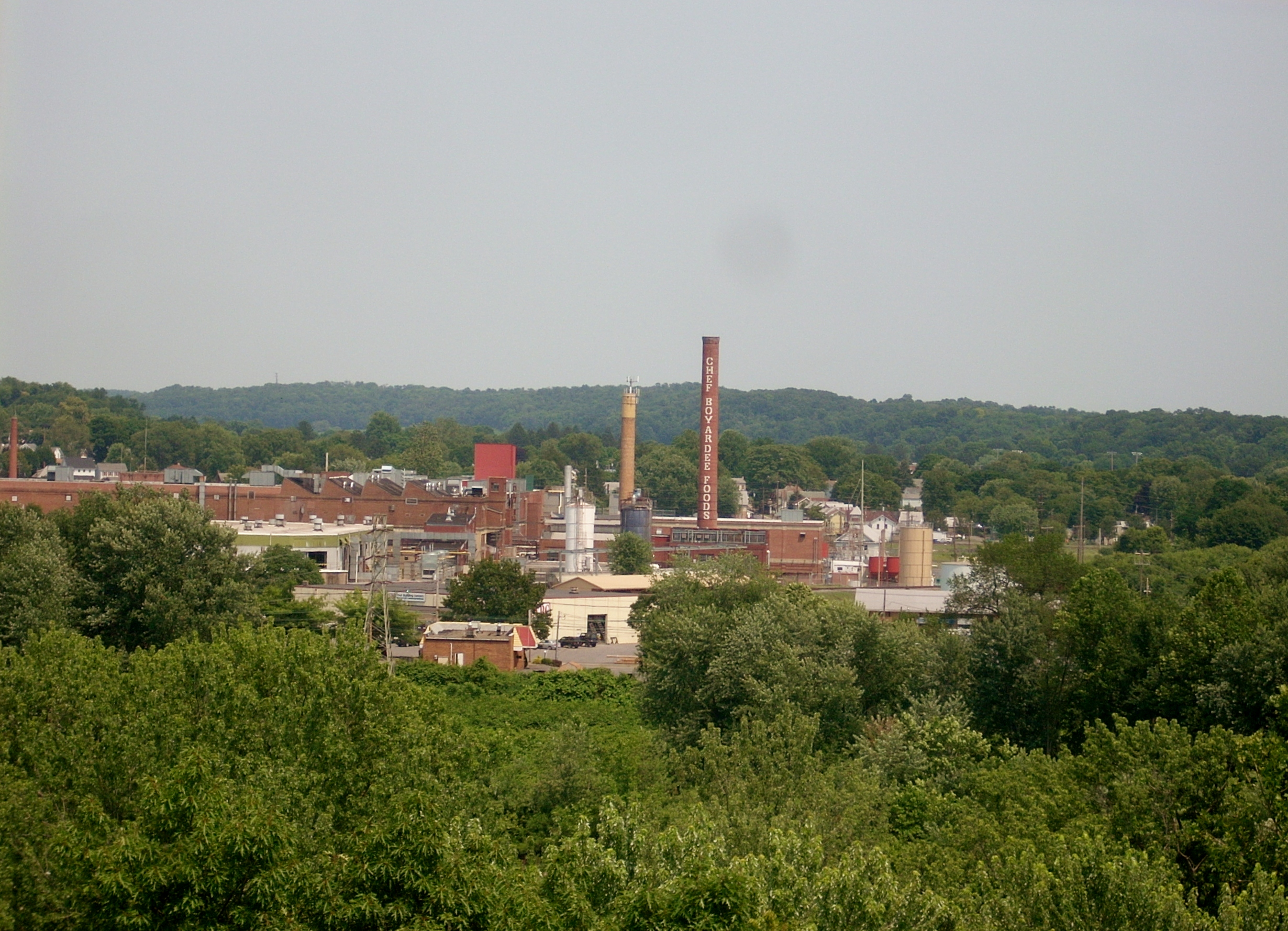
The Chef Boyardee factory in Milton, Pennsylvania, as seen from across the West Branch Susquehanna River at Central Oak Heights

In 1924, after leaving his position as head chef at the Plaza Hotel in New York City, Ettore Boiardi opened a restaurant called Il Giardino d'Italia ("The Garden of Italy") at East 9th Street and Woodland Avenue in Cleveland, Ohio. The idea for Chef Boiardi came about when restaurant customers began asking Boiardi for his spaghetti sauce, which he began to distribute in milk bottles. In 1928, Boiardi met Maurice and Eva Weiner, who were patrons of his restaurant and owners of a local self-service grocery store chain. The Weiners helped the Boiardi brothers develop a large-scale process for canning the food in Cleveland. They also procured distribution across the United States through their grocery's wholesale partners.

He decided to anglicize and phonetically spell out the name of his product as "Boy-Ar-Dee" to help Americans pronounce his name correctly. In 1928, the first product to be sold was a "ready-to-heat spaghetti kit". The kit included uncooked pasta, tomato sauce, and a container of grated cheese. By 1938, the company had outgrown its Ohio facility, and production was moved to Milton, Pennsylvania, where they could grow their own mushrooms and there was a ready supply of tomatoes.

Two Chef Boyardee Mini Bites canned pasta products

During World War II, the U.S. military commissioned the company for the production of army rations, requiring the factory to run 24 hours a day. At its peak, the company employed approximately 5,000 workers and produced 250,000 cans per day. After the war, production was scaled down and many of the wartime staff became expendable and their jobs were at risk. In order to preserve the employees’ jobs, Boiardi and his brother Mario decided to sell the company to American Home Foods in 1946 for nearly $6 million (equivalent to $99 million in 2025).

Boiardi remained as a spokesman and consultant for the brand until 1978 and appeared in television commercials for the brand. In 1996, American Home Foods turned its food division into International Home Foods. In 2000, International Home Foods was purchased by ConAgra Foods, which continued to produce Chef Boyardee canned pastas bearing Boiardi's likeness.

In 2025, Chef Boyardee was sold to Brynwood Partners under its portfolio company Hometown Food Company.

== Advertising ==
Chef Boyardee is one of the few brands to request to be removed from an episode of Seinfeld. In the 1996 episode The Rye, Kramer is allowed to operate a Hansom cab for a week, and feeds the horse excess cans of Beefaroni, which causes frequent and foul smelling flatulence. As a result of the request, the name was changed to "Beef-a-reeno".

In 2005, Chef Boyardee was shown in MasterCard's Icons commercial during Super Bowl XXXIX, which depicts advertising mascots having dinner together.

In 2018, Barbara Lippert of Advertising Age compared the 1966 Young & Rubicam ad for Beefaroni to The 400 Blows and running of the bulls. The ad features a large group of children running through Venice singing, "Hooray...for Beefaroni!" Lippert believed the ad influenced other commercials such as Prince Spaghetti (known for "Anthony! Anthony!") and Hilltop for Coca-Cola.

== See also ==
- SpaghettiOs
