= Ettore Boiardi =

Italian-American chef (1897–1985)

- Boiardi in a 1953 television commercial
- Born: October 22, 1897; Borgonovo Val Tidone, Emilia, Kingdom of Italy
- Died: June 21, 1985 (aged 87); Parma, Ohio, U.S.
- Resting place: All Souls Cemetery, Chardon, Ohio, U.S.
- Occupation: Chef
- Known for: Chef Boyardee foods, head chef of Plaza Hotel
- Spouse: Helen J. Wroblewski (m. 1923)
- Children: 1

Ettore Boiardi (October 22, 1897 – June 21, 1985), Americanized as Hector Boyardee, was an Italian-American chef and entrepreneur, famous for his brand of food products, Chef Boyardee.

== Early life ==
Ettore Boiardi was born in Borgonovo Val Tidone, near Piacenza, Italy, in 1897, to Giuseppe Boiardi and Maria Maffi. At the age of 11, he was working as an apprentice chef at local restaurant La Croce Bianca (Italian for White Cross), although his duties were confined to non-cooking odd jobs such as potato peeling and dealing with the trash. He later learned more restaurant skills in Paris and London.

On May 9, 1914, at age 16, he arrived at Ellis Island aboard La Lorraine, a French ship.

== Career ==
After his arrival in New York, Boiardi worked in a succession of upscale Manhattan restaurants, including those at the Claridge and Ritz-Carlton hotels. He then followed his brother Paolo to the kitchen of the Plaza Hotel in New York City, working his way up to head chef. He supervised the preparation of the homecoming meal served by Woodrow Wilson at the White House for 2,000 returning World War I soldiers. During this time Boiardi also worked at The Greenbrier, in White Sulphur Springs, West Virginia.

In 1917, Boiardi moved to Cleveland and worked at first at The Union Club, then became the head chef at the Hotel Winton, where he introduced a menu featuring Italian cuisine, including spaghetti dinners. His tenure at the hotel lasted until 1924, at which point he departed to establish his own restaurant, Il Giardino d'Italia (The Garden of Italy), at the intersection of East 9th Street and Woodland Avenue. The patrons of Il Giardino d'Italia frequently asked for samples and recipes of his spaghetti sauce, so he began selling it packaged in milk bottles.

In 1928, Boiardi met Maurice and Eva Weiner, who were patrons of his restaurant and owners of a local self-service grocery store chain. The Weiners helped the Boiardi brothers develop a large-scale process for canning the food. They also procured distribution across the United States through their grocery's wholesale partners. Boiardi's spaghetti sauce was soon being stocked in markets nationwide. In 1928, the company opened a factory to meet the demands of national distribution.

After spaghetti sauce, their next product was a complete spaghetti meal, including a canister of grated Parmesan cheese, a box of dry spaghetti and a jar of sauce, held together in cellophane wrap. By then, the company was the largest importer of Parmesan cheese into the US, while also buying tons of olive oil. Boiardi introduced his product to the public in 1928.

In 1938, production was moved to Milton, Pennsylvania an area that was economically decimated from the Great Depression, where they could grow enough tomatoes to serve the factory's needs, which reached 20,000 tons of tomatoes per season at peak production; they also began growing their own mushrooms in the plant. Boiardi sold his products under the brand name "Chef Boy-Ar-Dee" because people who did not speak Italian mispronounced his name, including his own salesforce.

For producing rations supplying Allied troops during World War II, he was awarded a Gold Star order of excellence from the United States War Department.

After struggling with cash flow, compounded by internal family struggles over the ownership and direction of the company in managing rapid internal growth and to preserve the employees jobs, he and his brother Mario sold a controlling interest in his firm in 1946 a year after the war ended to American Home Foods for nearly $6 million (equivalent to $102,467,692.31 in 2026 adjusted for inflation), later International Home Foods. He continued to operate restaurants in Cleveland, including one named Chef Hector's.

Boiardi appeared in many print advertisements and television commercials for his brand from the 1940s to the 1970s. His last appearance in a television commercial promoting the brand aired in 1979. Boiardi continued developing new Italian food products for the American market until his death in 1985.

== Death ==
Boiardi died of natural causes on June 21, 1985, at age 87 in a nursing home in the Cleveland suburb of Parma, Ohio, survived by his wife Helen J. (née Wroblewski; d. 1995) and son. He had five grandchildren. He is buried at All Souls Cemetery in Chardon Township, Ohio.

== Legacy ==
He is the great-uncle of American author Anna Boiardi, who wrote Delicious Memories: Recipes and Stories from the Chef Boyardee Family.

In 2025, Brynwood Partners acquired Chef Boyardee. The firm continues to use his likeness on Chef Boyardee-brand products, which are still made in Milton, Pennsylvania.
