= List of German exonyms for places in Belgium =

This is a list of German language exonyms for towns in Belgium. German is a minority language in Belgium, being especially used in the region of Arelerland.

== Complete list of names ==
Belgium
| English name | Belgian place | | German name | Notes |
| English name | Name | Language | German name | Notes |
|---|---|---|---|---|
| Aix-sur-Cloie | | | Esch auf der Heck | |
| Anlier | | | Ansler | |
| Arlon | | | Arel | |
| Athus | | | Athem | |
| Aubange | | | Ibingen | |
| Autelbas | | | Nieder Elter | |
| Autelhaut | | | Ober Elter | |
| Baelen | | | Balen | |
| Baraque Michel | | | Michelshütte | |
| Bastogne | | | Bastnach | Archaic |
| Bébange | | | Bebingen | |
| Beho | | | Bocholz | |
| Bettincourt | | | Bettenhoven | |
| Bilstain | | | Bilstein | |
| Bodange | | | Bodingen | |
| Boorshem | | | Boorsheim | |
| Botrange | | | Bortringen | |
| Bras | | | Bracht | |
| Bruges | Brugge | | Brügge | |
| Brussels | Bruxelles (French); Brussel (Dutch) | | Brüssel | |
| Buvange | | | Büvingen | |
| Chevremont | | | Schewement | |
| Clairefontaine | | | Bardenburg | |
| Commanster | | | Gommels | |
| Dendermonde | | | Dendermünde | |
| Fauvillers | | | Feiteler | |
| Faymonville | | | Außenborn | |
| Fouches | | | Offen | |
| Freylange | | | Freilen | |
| Goé | | | Gulke | |
| Gouvy | | | Geylich | |
| Guelff | | | Gelf | |
| Guerlange | | | Gerlingen | |
| Guirsch | | | Girsch | |
| Habay | | | Habich | |
| Habergy | | | Hiewerdingen | |
| Hachy | | | Heuschlingen | |
| Halanzy | | | Helsingen | |
| Henri-Chapelle | | | Heinrichskapellen | |
| Hollange | | | Hollingen | |
| Hondelange | | | Hondelingen | |
| Honville | | | Hondorf | |
| Hotte | | | Hotten | |
| Houffalize | | | Hohenfels | |
| Houwald | | | Hauwald | |
| Jalhay | | | Gellert | |
| Klinkapell | | | Kleinkapell | |
| La Bruyère | | | Heide | |
| La Clouse | | | Klause | |
| La Roche-en-Ardenne | | | Welschfels | |
| Leuven | | | Löwen | |
| Liège | | | Lüttich | |
| Liverchamps | | | Liespelt | |
| Longeau | | | Laser | |
| Losange | | | Lössingen | |
| Louvain-la-Neuve | | | Neu-Löwen | |
| Lutrebois | | | Lauterbach | |
| Lutremagne | | | Lautermänchen | |
| Maasmechelen | | | Mecheln an der Maas | |
| Malmedy | | | Malmünd | |
| Martelange | | | Martelingen | |
| Mé | | | Meiz | |
| Mechelen | | | Mecheln | |
| Meix-le-Tige | | | Deutsch Meer | |
| Menufontaine | | | Munerhof | |
| Messancy | | | Metzig | |
| Meuschemen | | | Möschemen | |
| Mouscron | Moeskroen | | Mußkrunn | |
| Mussy-la-Ville | | | Mützich | |
| Nobressart | | | Elcherthal | |
| Nothomb | | | Nothum | |
| Oostduinkerke | | | Ostdünkirchen | |
| Oostende | | | Ostend | |
| Ourthe | | | Urt | |
| Parette | | | Parett | |
| Plombières | | | Bleiberg | |
| Rachecourt | | | Rösig | |
| Radelange | | | Radelingen | |
| Rekem | | | Reckheim | |
| Remersdaal | | | Reemersthal | |
| Rodenhoff | | | Rodenhof | |
| Sainlez | | | Saner | |
| Sampoint | | | Saas | |
| Schockville | | | Schockweiler | |
| Sélange | | | Selingen | |
| Sint-Niklaas | | | Sankt Nikolaus | |
| Sourbrodt | | | Sauerbrodt | Rare |
| Stembert | | | Steinberg | |
| Stokkem | | | Stockheim | |
| Strainchamps | | | Sauerfeld | |
| Thiaumont | | | Diedenberg | |
| Tintange | | | Tintingen | |
| Toernich | | | Törnich | |
| Tongeren | | | Tongern | |
| Tontelange | | | Tontelingen | |
| Trois-Ponts | | | Dreibrücken | |
| Turpange | | | Türpingen | |
| Udange | | | Üdingen | |
| Vance | | | Wanen | |
| Verviers | | | Velwisch | |
| Viller | | | Weiler | |
| Villers-la-Bonne-Eau | | | Weiterbach | |
| Villers-Tortru | | | Weiler-Törtchen | |
| Visé | | | Weset | |
| Vivier | | | Weier | |
| Viville | | | Alten-hofen | |
| Vlamerie | | | Flamerei | |
| Vlessart | | | Wallesser | |
| Waimes | | | Weismes | |
| Waltzing | | | Walzingen | |
| Wavre | | | Waver | |
| Welkenraedt | | | Welkenrath | |
| Wilcour | | | Wilkerheid | |
| Wisembach | | | Weißenbach | |
| Wô | | | Weiz | |
| Wolkrange | | | Wolkingen | |
| Ypres | Ieper | | Ypern | |
| Zeebrugge | | | Seebrügge | |

== See also ==
- German exonyms
- List of European exonyms
