= Messancy =

Municipality in Wallonia, Belgium

Messancy Miezeg (Luxembourgish): Metzig (German)
- Municipality
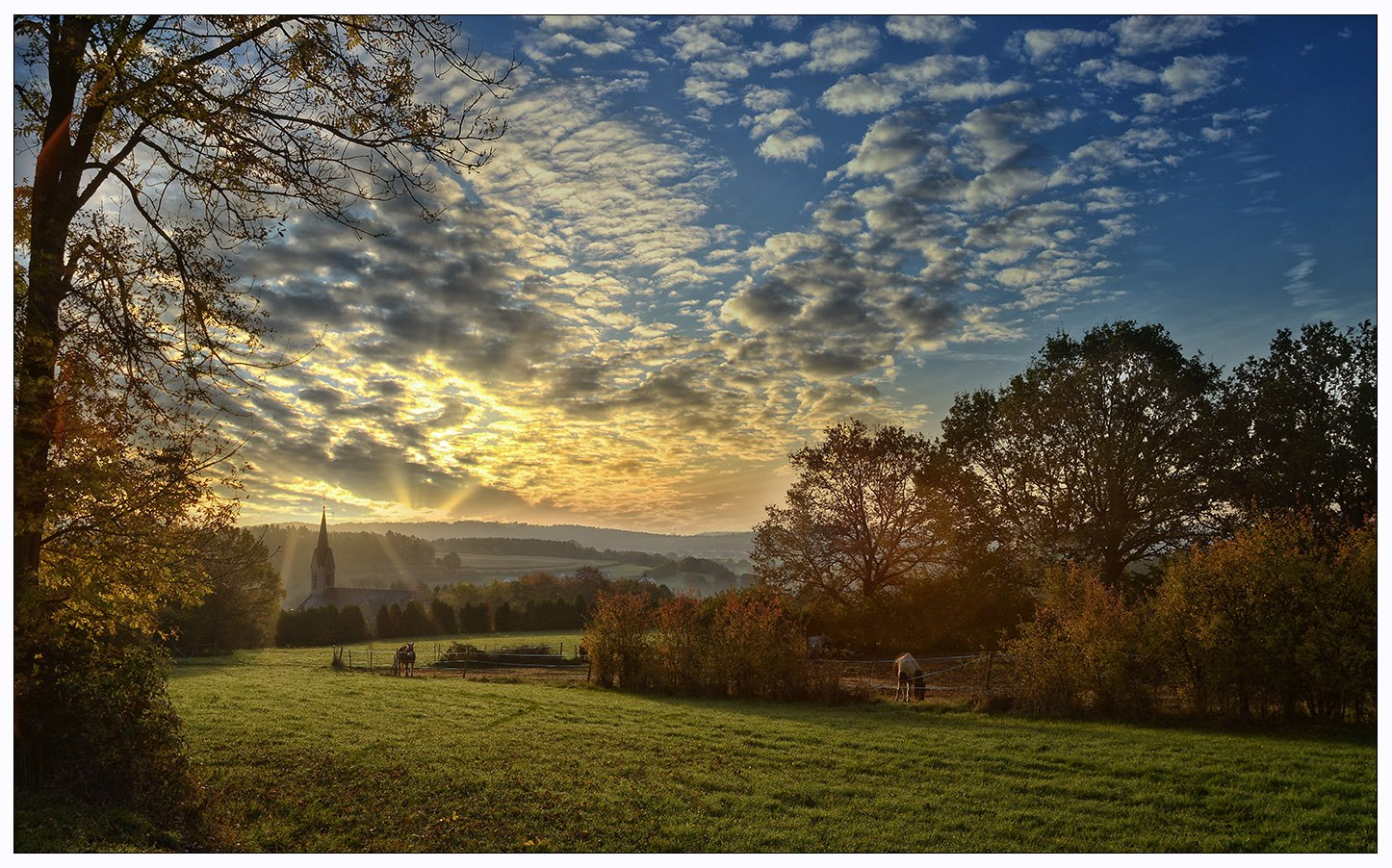

- Flag Coat of arms

- Location of Messancy in Luxembourg province
- Interactive map of Messancy
- Location in Belgium
- Coordinates: 49°35.7′N 05°49.1′E
- Country: Belgium
- Community: French Community
- Region: Wallonia
- Province: Luxembourg
- Arrondissement: Arlon

Government
  - Mayor: Christiane Kirsch
  - Governing party: Nouvelle Union Communale

Area
  - Total: 52.62 km^{2} (20.32 sq mi)

Population (2018-01-01)
  - Total: 8,185
  - Density: 155.5/km^{2} (402.9/sq mi)
- Postal codes: 6780–6782
- NIS code: 81015
- Area codes: 063
- Website: (in French) messancy.be

Messancy (French pronunciation: [mεsɑ̃si]; German: Metzig [ˈmɛtsɪç]; Luxembourgish: Miezeg; Walloon: Messanceye) is a municipality of Wallonia located in the province of Luxembourg, Belgium.

== Population ==
On 1 January 2022 the municipality, had 8,339 inhabitants, giving a population density of 159.1 inhabitants per km^{2}.

== Area ==
The municipality covers 52.43 km^{2}.

== Sub-Municipalities ==
The municipality consists of the following districts: Habergy, Hondelange, Messancy, Sélange, and Wolkrange.

Other population centers include: Bébange, Buvange, Differt, Guelff, Longeau, and Turpange.

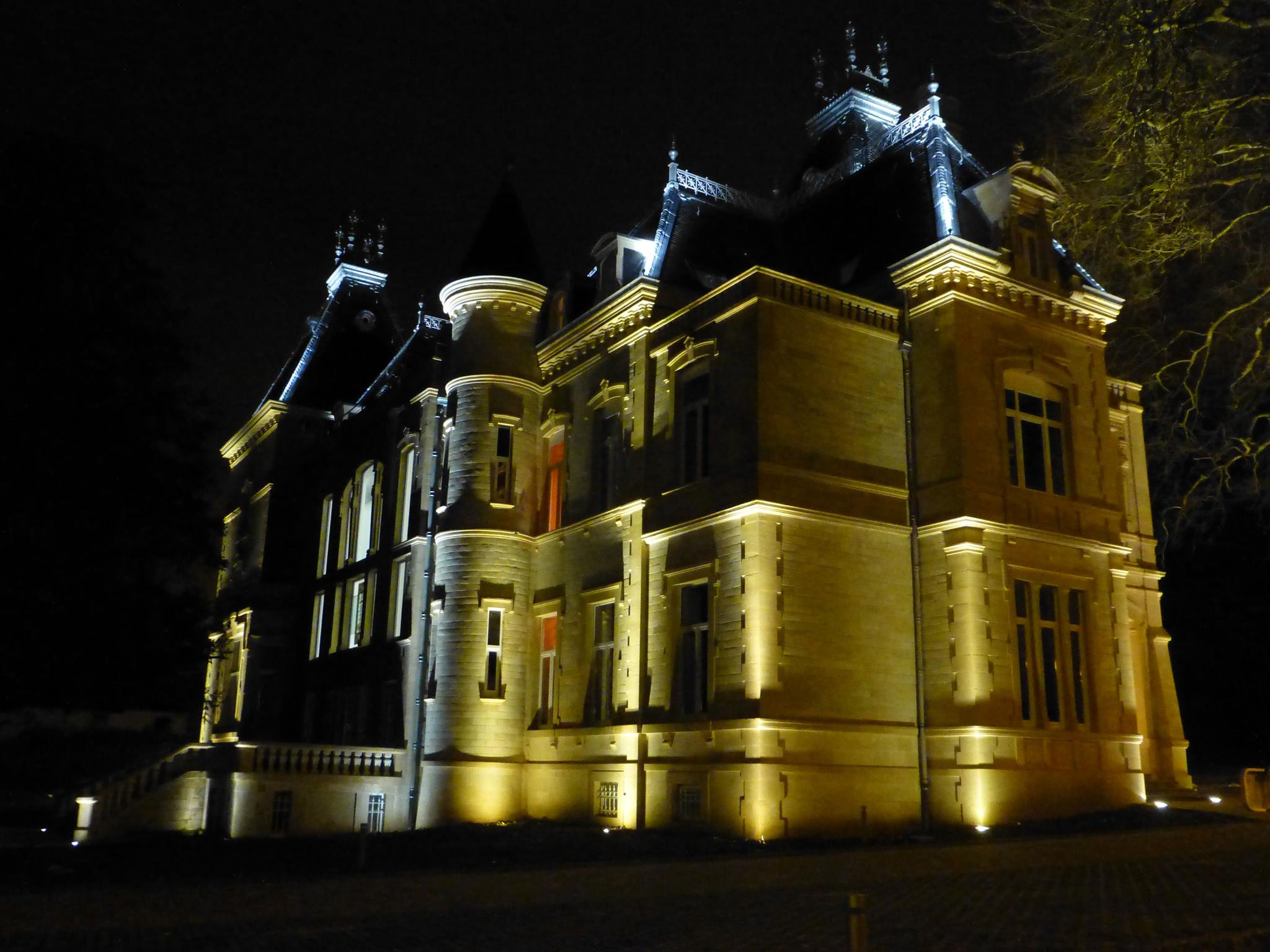
Messancy town hall

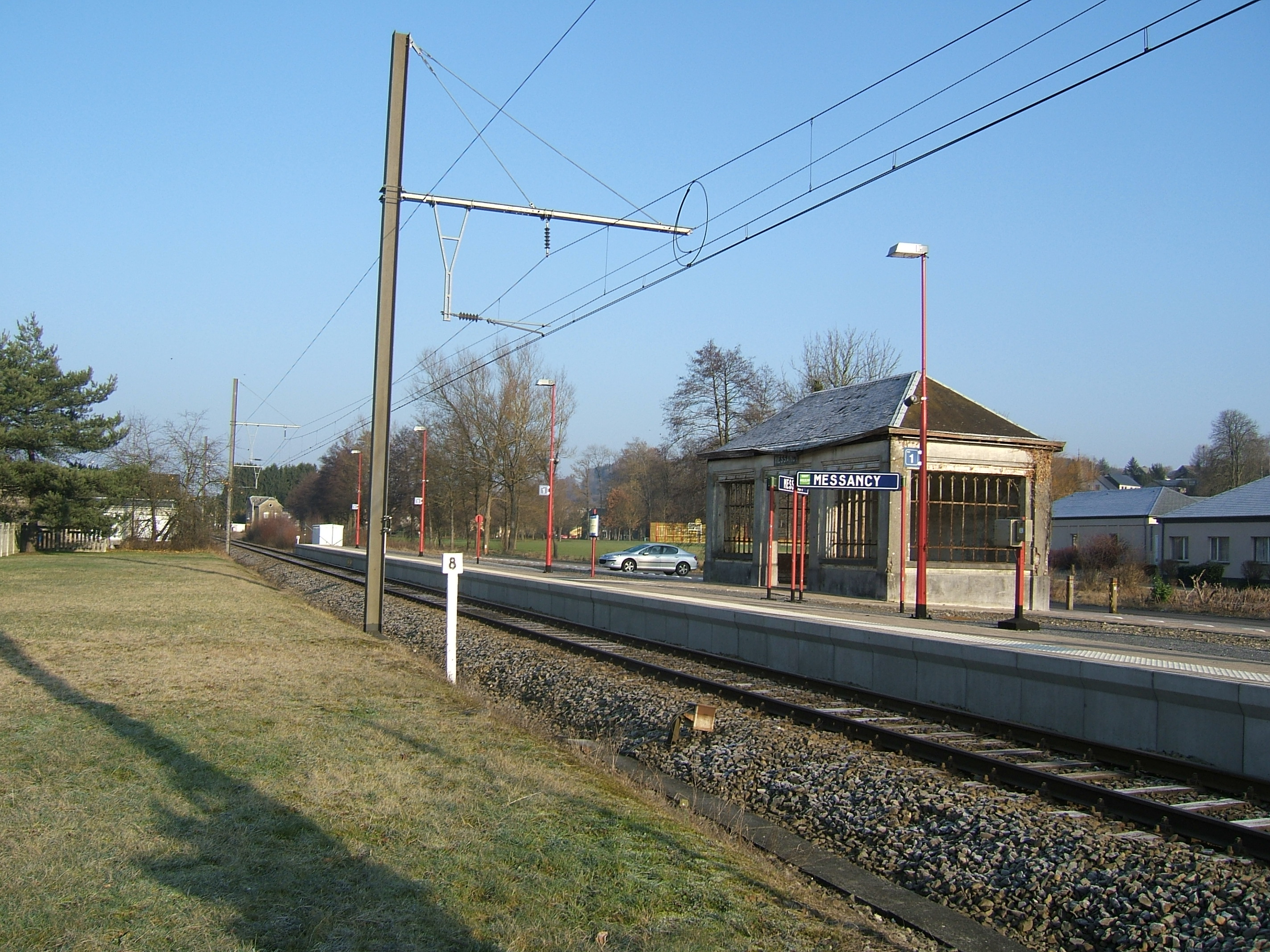
Messancy train station

== Transport ==
Messancy is transversed by the E25 highway from Liège to Luxembourg in the north. There are no highway exits in Messancy, but there is one exit just north of the municipality at Weyler. The European highway E411 from Brussels and Namur is double signed with the E25 until the exit in Weyler where it takes the N81 south. The major N81 route crosses the municipality north to south. It arrives from the provincial capital Arlon, passing the highway at the Weyler exit and continues south to Aubange and the French border near Longwy. It forms the backbone for transportation to the commune. The following national routes transvere Messancy:

- E25: Liège – Arlon – Luxembourg (Luxembourg City)
- E411: Brussels – Namur – Arlon – Messancy – France (Longwy)
- N81: Arlon – Differt – Messancy – Aubange
- N813: Aic-sur-Cloie – Meix-le-Tige – Étalle
- N870: Halanzy – Habergy – Arlon
- N883: France (Mont-Saint-Martin) – Aubange – Messancy – Differt

Guelff, Bébange, Buvange, Longeau, Sélange, Turpange, Wolkrange and Hondelange are only reachable via municipal roads and are not connected via the national route network. Wolkrange, Hondelange, Turpange and Buvange are located very close to the N81 road though. Sélange hosts the only border crossing in the municipality towards the Luxembourgish village Clemency.

Messancy is served by the Walloon transport authority TEC with following bus lines:

- 16/161: Virton – Athus – Messancy – Differt – Arlon
- 20/201: Châtillon – Rachecourt – Habergy – Guelff – Bébange – Differt – Buvange – Wolkrange – Arlon
- 21: Battincourt – Athus – Longeau – Messancy – Turpange – Differt – Arlon
- 211: Battincourt – Athus – Longeau – Messancy – Turpange/Differt OR Sélange/Hondelange – Arlon – Stockem
- 212: Rodange (LU) – Athus – Differt – Turpange – Buvange – Wolkrange – Arlon
- 213: Messancy – Sélange – Hondelange – Arlon
- 721: Musson – Athus – Messancy – Differt
- 722: Bascharage (LU) – Athus – Differt
- 723: Arlon – Differt
- 731: Saint-Léger – Habergy – Guelff – Bébange – Wolkrange – Buvange – Differt – Messancy – Athus
- 741: Arlon – Hondelange – Sélange – Messancy – Differt – Turpange – Messancy – Longeau – Athus
- 80: Arlon – Hondelange – Luxembourg City (LU)
- 83: Virton – Aubange – Messancy – Differt – Luxembourg City (LU)

Beside TEC, there is also Luxembourgish bus service:

- 801: Luxembourg City (LU) – Capellen (LU) – Hondelange – Sélange – Messancy

Messancy has one train station in the main village. It is only served by local, slow train service on one line:

- L-165: Libramont – Bertrix – Virton – Messancy – Arlon

The closest airport with public service is Luxembourg Airport 30km to the east.

== See also ==
- List of protected heritage sites in Messancy
