= Vietnamese exonyms =

Below is a list of Vietnamese exonyms for various places around the world:

== History ==
Historical exonyms include place names of bordering countries, namely Thailand, Laos, China, and Cambodia.

During the expansion of Vietnam (Nam tiến) some place names have become Vietnamized. Consequently, as control of different places and regions has shifted among China, Vietnam, and other Southeast Asian countries, the Vietnamese names for places can sometimes differ from the names residents of aforementioned places use, although nowadays it has become more common for the Vietnamese names of places to simply be Vietnamese transcriptions of the local placenames.

Many non-Vietnamese places may have more than one Vietnamese name, as shown below.

=== Sino-Vietnamese exonyms ===
Before modernity, sources of names of foreign places in Vietnam came from documents that were mostly written in Classical Chinese. So many exonyms derive directly from Chinese pronunciations (see: Chinese exonyms). This in turn got transliterated into the Vietnamese, sinoxenic pronunciations of the Chinese characters (also called Sino-Vietnamese pronunciation). For example, Scotland is rendered as 蘇格蘭 in Chinese. This is pronounced as Sū-gé-lán in Mandarin Chinese, a somewhat faithful transcription of the original name. However, as applied to all Chinese characters, 蘇格蘭 can be transliterated into Vietnamese as Tô Cách Lan, which strays a bit further from the native English and Scots name. A major issue using Chinese characters to transcribe words is the fact that Chinese characters can be pronounced drastically differently among all the spoken languages and dialects that use them, which include Mandarin, Cantonese, Japanese, Korean, and Vietnamese among several others, the majority of which have dramatically different phonologies and phonemes from each other. By the nature of the writing system itself, Chinese characters tend to preserve a word's syllable count, morphemes, and meanings more reliably than they do as an accurate representation of the word's pronunciation, considering that the Chinese character system itself primarily represents logograms (though some have elements of phonetic information) as opposed to phonemes of the language. The use of Sino-Vietnamese exonyms has become archaic during recent times, and only some countries, such as France, the US, Russia, Australia, India and most European countries, retain the Sino-Vietnamese pronunciations. Even so, many of the aforementioned countries also have exonyms more accurate to the native pronunciations of their respective endonyms. Currently, the countries still called by their Sino-Vietnamese names are: China, Egypt, India, Japan, Korea, Mongolia, Russia, Thailand, Turkey, Austria, Belgium, Denmark, Finland, France, Germany, Greece, Italy, the Netherlands, Norway, Poland, Portugal, Spain, Sweden, Switzerland, the UK, England, the US and Australia. London and Pyongyang are the only two cities in Europe and Korea known by the Sino-Vietnamese name.

=== Exonyms from other languages ===
In modern times, Vietnamese has relied less on Sino-Vietnamese-derived exonyms and it has become more common for Vietnamese exonyms to more accurately transcribe the endonym according to its native language. Thus, place names outside of East Asia can often be respelled in a way that Vietnamese can pronounce it using a transcription method called Vietnamization. For example, although Scotland can be called by its Sino-Vietnamese exonym, Tô Cách Lan, spellings such as Xcốt-len and Scôtlen are also acceptable. This method has more general patterns than steadfast rules, depending on the writer. For example, the name "Saddam Hussein" can be spelled as Sađam Hutxen, Sátđam Hutxen, or Saddam Hudsein. This is similar to native to how English speakers spelled their own names in various and inconsistent ways before English spelling became fossilized. For example, William Shakespeare spelled his own surname at least 3 different ways.

However, it has recently become more common for the English exonym or the romanization of the endonym to be written without any changes to spelling, though Vietnamese readers may still pronounce the name using a Vietnamese accent. In some cases, the name may retain an unchanged spelling, but a footnote may appear regarding how to pronounce the name in Vietnamese. For example, in the Harry Potter series of novels, the spelling of names for characters "Marge" and "Filch" remains unchanged, but footnotes exist to help Vietnamese speakers pronounce their names, which are written as "Mạc" and "Fít" respectively.

There are a few country names borrowed from French and Russian as Vietnam's history is closely linked to France and Russia. Countries whose names borrow from French are: Morocco, Cyprus, Lebanon, Saudi Arabia, Czech. And the countries whose names borrowed from Russian are Georgia and Lithuania. Vienna (Viên in Vietnamese) is the only city whose name in Vietnamese is borrowed from French. Hong Kong and Macau names are borrowed from English by direct transliteration into Hồng Kông and Ma Cao instead of Hương Cảng and Áo Môn in Sino-Vietnamese pronunciation.

=== Other cases ===
The names of Cambodia and Laos are directly transcribed from Khmer កម្ពុជា Kâmpŭchéa and Lao ລາວ Lav into Vietnamese as Campuchia and Lào. The names of Phnom Penh, Vientiane and Bangkok are directly transcribed from Khmer ភ្នំពេញ Phnum Pénh, Lao ວຽງຈັນ Viangchan and Thai บางกอก Bāngkxk into Vietnamese as Phnôm Pênh, Viêng Chăn and Băng Cốc. Ivory Coast is translated into Vietnamese as Bờ Biển Ngà, and at times it is transcribed from French as Cốt Đivoa.

== Afghanistan ==
Afghanistan A Phú Hãn, Áp-ga-ni-xtan
English name	Vietnamese name	Endonym		Notes
English name	Vietnamese name	Name	Language	
Kabul	Ka-bun	Kābol (کابل)	Persian	
Kabul	Ka-bun	Kābəl (کابل)	Pashto	

== Albania ==
Albania An-ba-ni
English name	Vietnamese name	Endonym		Notes
English name	Vietnamese name	Name	Language	
Tirana	Ti-ra-na	Tiranë	Albanian	

== Algeria ==
Algeria An-giê-ri
English name	Vietnamese name	Endonym		Notes
English name	Vietnamese name	Name	Language	
Algiers	thủ đô nước An-giê-ri	Al-Jazāʾir (الجزائر)	Standard Arabic	

== Argentina ==
Argentina Á Căn Đình, Ác-hen-ti-na
English name	Vietnamese name	Endonym		Notes
English name	Vietnamese name	Name	Language	
Buenos Aires	Lương Phong, Bu-ê-nốt Ai-rết	Buenos Aires	Spanish	

== Australia ==
Australia Úc Đại Lợi, Úc
English name	Vietnamese name	Endonym		Notes
English name	Vietnamese name	Name	Language	
Melbourne	Miêu Bình, Mai Bình, Men-bơn	Melbourne	English	
Sydney	Tất Ni, Xích-ni	Sydney	English	

== Austria ==
Austria Áo Địa Lợi, Áo
English name	Vietnamese name	Endonym		Notes
English name	Vietnamese name	Name	Language	
Vienna	Viên	Wien	German	

== Bahrain ==
Bahrain Ba-ranh

== Bangladesh ==
Bangladesh Băng-la-đét
English name	Vietnamese name	Endonym		Notes
English name	Vietnamese name	Name	Language	
Dhaka	Đắc-ca	Dhaka (ঢাকা)	Bengali	

== Belarus ==
Belarus Bê-la-rút, Bạch Nga
English name	Vietnamese name	Endonym		Notes
English name	Vietnamese name	Name	Language	
Minsk	Min-xcơ	Minsk (Мінск)	Belarusian	

== Belgium ==
Belgium Bỉ Lợi Thời, Biên Xích, Bỉ
English name	Vietnamese name	Endonym		Notes
English name	Vietnamese name	Name	Language	
Brussels	Bức San, Brúc-xen	Brussel	Dutch	
Brussels	Bức San, Brúc-xen	Bruxelles	French	

== Brazil ==
Brazil Ba Tây, Bi Lê Diên Lô, Bra-xin
English name	Vietnamese name	Endonym		Notes
English name	Vietnamese name	Name	Language	
Brasilia	Ba Tây thành, Bra-xi-li-a	Brasilia	Portuguese	
Rio de Janeiro	Ri-ô đề Gia-nây-rô	Rio de Janeiro	Portuguese	
São Paulo	Thánh Phao Lồ	São Paulo	Portuguese	

== Bulgaria ==
Bulgaria Bun-ga-ri
English name	Vietnamese name	Endonym		Notes
English name	Vietnamese name	Name	Language	
Sofia	Xô-phi-a	Sofija (София)	Bulgarian	

== Cambodia ==
Cambodia (Cao Miên, Cam Bốt, Campuchia)
English	Vietnamese	Endonym		Notes
English	Vietnamese	Name	Language	
Angkor	Đế Thiên Đế Thích	Ângkôr (អង្គរ)	Khmer	
Banteay Meas	Sài Mạt	Bântéay Méas (បន្ទាយមាស)	Khmer	
Battambang	Bát Tầm Bôn	Băt Dâmbâng (បាត់ដំបង)	Khmer	
Bavet	Truông Cát	Bavĭt (បាវិត)	Khmer	
Bokor	Tà Lơn	Bok Koŭ (បូកគោ)	Khmer	
Damrei Mountains	Tượng Sơn	Phnum Dâmri (ភ្នំដំរី)	Khmer	
Kampot	Cần Bột	Kâmpôt (កំពត)	Khmer	
Kep	Bạch Mã	Kêb (កែប)	Khmer	
Kiri Vong	Linh Quỳnh	Kĭrivóng (គិរីវង់)	Khmer	
Koh Tang	Hòn Thăng	Kaôh Tang (កោះតាង)	Khmer	
Koh Wai	Hòn Trọc, Hòn Vây	Kaôh Puluvey (កោះពូលូវៃ)	Khmer	
Kompong Chhnang	Xà Năng	Kâmpóng Chhnăng (កំពង់ឆ្នាំង)	Khmer	
Kratié	Cần Ché	Krâchéh (ក្រចេះ)	Khmer	
Lavek/Longvek	La Bích	Lvêk (ល្វែក); Lôngvêk (លង្វែក)	Khmer	
Neak Loeung	Hối Lương, Cầu Nam	'nâk Lœăng (អ្នកលឿង)	Khmer	
Peam Chor	Biên Chúc	Péam Chôr (ពាមជរ)	Khmer	
Phnom Penh	Nam Vang, Nam Vinh, Kim Biên, Phnôm Pênh	Phnum Pénh (ភ្នំពេញ)	Khmer	
Pursat	Phú Túc	Poŭthĭsăt (ពោធិ៍សាត់)	Khmer	
Siem Reap	Xiêm Riệp	Siĕm Réab (សៀមរាប)	Khmer	
Sihanoukville	Kâm Póng Sao, Hương Úc, Vũng Thơm	Krŏng Preăh Seihânŭ (ក្រុងព្រះសីហនុ); Kâmpóng Saôm (កំពង់សោម)	Khmer	
Svay Rieng	Tuy Lạp, Xoài Riêng	Svay Riĕng (ស្វាយរៀង)	Khmer	
Tonlé Sap	Đồng Lê, Biển Hồ	Tônlé Sab (ទន្លេសាប)	Khmer	

== Canada ==
Canada Gia Nã Đại
English name	Vietnamese name	Endonym		Notes
English name	Vietnamese name	Name	Language	
British Columbia	Columbia Thuộc Anh	British Columbia	English	
Montreal	Mông Triệu, Ngự Sơn	Montréal	French	
Ottawa	Ốc Đa Hoa, Ốt-ta-goa	Ottawa	English	
Quebec	Quế Bích	Québec	French	
Toronto	Tô Luân	Toronto	English	
Vancouver	Văn Cầu	Vancouver	English	

== China ==
China Trung Hoa, Trung Quốc
English name	Vietnamese name	Endonym		Notes
English name	Vietnamese name	Name	Language	
Beijing	Bắc Kinh	Běijīng (北京)	Mandarin	
Changchun	Trường Xuân	Chángchūn (长春)	Mandarin	
Changsha	Trường Sa	Chángshā (长沙)	Mandarin	
Chengdu	Thành Đô	Chéngdū (成都)	Mandarin	
Chongqing	Trùng Khánh	Chóngqìng (重庆)	Mandarin	
Fujian	Phúc Kiến	Fújiàn (福建)	Mandarin	
Fujian	Phúc Kiến	Hok-kiàn	Hokkien	
Guangzhou	Quảng Châu	Guǎngzhōu (广州)	Mandarin	
Guilin	Quế Lâm	Guìlín (桂林)	Mandarin	
Hainan	Hải Nam	Hǎinán (海南)	Mandarin	
Harbin	Cáp Nhĩ Tân	Hā'ĕrbīn (哈尔滨)	Mandarin	
Hohhot	Hô Hòa Hạo Đặc, Hồi Hột	Hūhéhàotè (呼和浩特)	Mandarin	
Hohhot	Hô Hòa Hạo Đặc, Hồi Hột	Kökeqota (ᠬᠥᠬᠡᠬᠣᠲᠠ)	Mongolian script	
Hong Kong	Hương Cảng, Hồng Kông	Xiānggǎng (香港)	Mandarin	
Hong Kong	Hương Cảng, Hồng Kông	Hēunggóng	Cantonese	
Hong Kong	Hương Cảng, Hồng Kông	Hong Kong	English	
Inner Mongolia	Nội Mông (Cổ)	Nèi Měnggǔ (内蒙古)	Mandarin	
Inner Mongolia	Nội Mông (Cổ)	Öbür Monggol (ᠥᠪᠥᠷ ᠮᠣᠩᠭᠣᠯ)	Mongolian script	
Lhasa	Lạp Tát	Lāsà (拉萨)	Mandarin	
Macau	Áo Môn, Ma Cao	Àomén(澳門)	Mandarin	
Macau	Áo Môn, Ma Cao	Ōumún	Cantonese	
Macau	Áo Môn, Ma Cao	Macau	Portuguese	
Nanjing	Nam Kinh	Nánjīng (南京)	Mandarin	
Sanya	Tam Á	Sānyà (三亚)	Mandarin	
Shanghai	Thượng Hải	Shànghǎi (上海)	Mandarin	
Shenzhen	Thâm Quyến	Shēnzhèn (深圳)	Mandarin	
Sichuan	Tứ Xuyên	Sìchuān (四川)	Mandarin	
Ürümqi	U-rum-xi, Urumsi, Ô Lỗ Mộc Tề	Wūlǔmùqí (乌鲁木齐)	Mandarin	
Ürümqi	U-rum-xi, Urumsi, Ô Lỗ Mộc Tề	Ürümchi (ئۈرۈمچی)	Uyghur	
Wuhan	Vũ Hán	Wǔhàn (武汉)	Mandarin	
Xiamen	Hạ Môn	Xiàmén (厦门)	Mandarin	
Xi'an	Tây An	Xī'ān (西安)	Mandarin	
Yangtze River	Trường Giang	Cháng Jiāng (长江)	Mandarin	
Zhengzhou	Trịnh Châu	Zhèngzhōu (郑州)	Mandarin	

== Cyprus ==
Cyprus Đảo Síp
English name	Vietnamese name	Endonym		Notes
English name	Vietnamese name	Name	Language	
Nicosia	Ni-cô-xi-a	Lefkosía (Λευκωσία)	Greek	
Nicosia	Ni-cô-xi-a	Lefkoşa	Turkish	

== Czech Republic ==
Czech Republic Tiệp Khắc, Séc
English name	Vietnamese name	Endonym		Notes
English name	Vietnamese name	Name	Language	
Prague	Thiệp Khẩu, Pra-ha	Praha	Czech	

== Denmark ==
Denmark Đan Mạch
English name	Vietnamese name	Endonym		Notes
English name	Vietnamese name	Name	Language	
Copenhagen	Cô-pen-ha-ghen, Cô-pen-ha-gen	København	Danish	
Greenland	Grin-len, Thanh Đảo	Grønland	Danish	
Nuuk	Nu-úc	Godthåb	Danish	

== Egypt ==
Egypt Ai Cập, Y Diệp, Ê-díp-tô
English name	Vietnamese name	Endonym		Notes
English name	Vietnamese name	Name	Language	
Alexandria	A-lếch-xan-đri-a	al-Iskandarīyya (الإسكندرية)	Standard Arabic	
Alexandria	A-lếch-xan-đri-a	Rakoti (Ⲣⲁⲕⲟϯ)	Coptic	
Cairo	Kê Thành	al-Qāhirah (القاهرة)	Standard Arabic	
Cairo	Kê Thành	Maṣr (مَصر)	Egyptian Arabic	Maṣr is the same name as the Arabic name for the country. As Cairo is the country's primate city, the endonym can sometimes be used to identify the city as well.
Port Said	thành phố Cảng (Port) Said	Bor Sa3yīd(بورسعيد)	Egyptian Arabic	

== Eritrea ==
Eritrea Ê-ri-tơ-rê-a

== Estonia ==
Estonia E-xtô-ni-a
English name	Vietnamese name	Endonym		Notes
English name	Vietnamese name	Name	Language	
Tallinn	Ta-lin	Talin	Estonian	

== Ethiopia ==
Ethiopia Ê-thi-óp, Ê-thi-ô-bi, Ê-ti-ô-pi-a
English name	Vietnamese name	Endonym		Notes
English name	Vietnamese name	Name	Language	
Addis Ababa	A-đi A-ba-ba	አዲስ አበባ (Addis Abeba)	Amharic	

== Finland ==
Finland Phần Lan
English name	Vietnamese name	Endonym		Notes
English name	Vietnamese name	Name	Language	
Helsinki	Hiệu Sinh Kì	Helsinki	Finnish	

== France ==
France Pháp Lan Tây, Pháp, Phú Lãng Sa
English name	Vietnamese name	Endonym		Notes
English name	Vietnamese name	Name	Language	
Lyon	Li-ông	Lyon	French	
Marseille	Ma-xai	Marseille	French	
Nice	Niết-xa	Nice	French	
New Caledonia	Tân Thế Giới	Nouvelle Calédonie	French	
Paris	Ba Lê, Pha Lí, Pa-ri	Paris	French	
Sète	Xét-ta	Sète	French	
Toulon	Thu-long	Toulon	French	

== Georgia ==
Georgia Gruzia, Gru-di-a, Giê-oóc-gi-a
English name	Vietnamese name	Endonym		Notes
English name	Vietnamese name	Name	Language	
Tbilisi	Tbi-li-xi	Tbilisi (თბილისი)	Georgian	

== Germany ==
Germany Đức, An-lê-mân
English name	Vietnamese name	Endonym		Notes
English name	Vietnamese name	Name	Language	
Berlin	Bá Linh, Béc-lin	Berlin	German	
Cologne	Côn, Cô-lô-nhơ	Köln / Koeln	German	
Hamburg	Hàm Phủ	Hamburg	German	
Hanover	An-nô-vi	Hannover	German	

== Greece ==
Greece Hy Lạp, Cự Liệt, Cừ Sách, Gờ-réc
English name	Vietnamese name	Endonym		Notes
English name	Vietnamese name	Name	Language	
Athens	Nhã Điển, Á Thiên, A-ten	Athína (Αθήνα)	Greek	
Ionian Islands	Y Du Nhiên		Greek	
Santorini	Đảo San Hô	Thíra (Θήρα)	Greek	
Thessalonica	Salonica	Thessaloníki (Θεσσαλονίκη)	Greek	
Zakynthos	San-tê	Zákynthos (Ζάκυνθος)	Greek	

== Iceland ==
Iceland Băng Đảo, Ai-xơ-len
English name	Vietnamese name	Endonym		Notes
English name	Vietnamese name	Name	Language	
Reykjavík	Rây-ki-a-vích	Reykjavík	Icelandic	

== India ==
India Ấn Độ, Thiên Trúc
English name	Vietnamese name	Endonym		Notes
English name	Vietnamese name	Name	Language	
Ganges	sông Hằng	Gangā (गंगा)	Hindi	
Goa	Cô Á	Gōvā (गोवा)	Hindi	
New Delhi	Tân Đề Li, Niu Đê-li	Naī Dillī (नई दिल्ली)	Hindi	

== Indonesia ==
Indonesia Nam Dương, Vạn Đảo, In-đô-nê-xi-a
English name	Vietnamese name	Endonym		Notes
English name	Vietnamese name	Name	Language	
Aceh	A Chinh	Aceh	Indonesian	
Batavia	Ba Thiềng			modern-day Jakarta
Jakarta	Giang Lưu Ba	Jakarta	Indonesian	
Java	Trảo Oa, Chà Và	Java	Indonesian	
Palembang	Tam Phật Tề	Palembang	Indonesian	

== Iran ==
Iran Ba Tư
English name	Vietnamese name	Endonym		Notes
English name	Vietnamese name	Name	Language	
Tehran	Tề Lan, Tê-hê-ran	Ťehrân (تهران)	Persian	

== Iraq ==
Iraq Y Lạp
English name	Vietnamese name	Endonym		Notes
English name	Vietnamese name	Name	Language	
Baghdad	Bác Đạt, Bát-đa	Baghdad (بغداد)	Standard Arabic	

== Ireland ==
Ireland Ái Nhĩ Lan, Ai-len
English name	Vietnamese name	Endonym		Notes
English name	Vietnamese name	Name	Language	
Dublin	Đạp Lân, Đu-blin	Baile Átha Cliath	Irish	English name also used locally

== Israel ==
Israel Do Thái, I-xra-en, Y-sơ-ra-ên, Ít-ra-en
English name	Vietnamese name	Endonym		Notes
English name	Vietnamese name	Name	Language	
Acre	Akko	Ako (עכו)	Hebrew	
Bethlehem	Bê-lem, Bết-lê-hem	Bayt Laḥm (בית לחם)	Hebrew	currently in Palestinian territories
Jerusalem	Gia Liêm, Giê-ru-xa-lem, Giê-ru-sa-lem	Yerushaláyim (ירושלים)	Hebrew	partially in Palestinian territories
Judea	Do Thái	Yehuda (יהודה)	Hebrew	currently in Palestinian territories

== Italy ==
Italy Ý Đại Lợi, Ý
English name	Vietnamese name	Endonym		Notes
English name	Vietnamese name	Name	Language	
Capri	Ca Pha Lí	Capri	Italian	
Florence	Phật Lan	Firenze	Italian	
Genoa	Giai Noa	Genoa	Italian	
Naples	Nạp Bồ Lê	Napoli	Italian	
Rome	La Mã	Roma	Italian	
Venice	Uy Nê Tư, Vơ-ni-dơ	Venezia	Italian	

== Japan ==
Japan Nhật Bản, Nhật, Nhựt Bổn
English name	Vietnamese name	Endonym		Notes
English name	Vietnamese name	Name	Language	
Hiroshima	Quảng Ðảo	Hiroshima (広島)	Japanese	
Hokkaido	Bắc Hải Ðạo	Hokkaidō (北海道)	Japanese	
Honshu	Bổn Châu	Honshū (本州)	Japanese	
Kansai	Quan Tây	Kansai (関西)	Japanese	
Kanto	Quan Ðông	Kantō (関東)	Japanese	
Kobe	Thần Hộ	Kōbe (神戸)	Japanese	
Kyoto	Kinh Ðô	Kyōto (京都)	Japanese	
Kyushu	Cửu Châu	Kyūshū (九州)	Japanese	
Mount Fuji	Núi Phú Sĩ, Phú Sĩ Sơn	Fujisan (富士山)	Japanese	
Nagasaki	Tràng Kỳ	Nagasaki (長崎)	Japanese	
Okinawa	Xung Thằng	Okinawa (沖縄)	Japanese	
Osaka	Đại Phản	Ōsaka (大阪)	Japanese	
Ryukyu	Lưu Cầu	Ryūkyū (琉球)	Japanese	
Sapporo	Trát Hoảng	Sapporo (札幌)	Japanese	
Sendai	Tiên Ðài	Sendai (仙台)	Japanese	
Senkaku	Tiêm Các	Senkaku Shotō (尖閣諸島)	Japanese	
Shikoku	Tứ Quốc	Shikoku (四国)	Japanese	
Tokyo	Đông Kinh	Tōkyō (東京)	Japanese	

While some Japanese have Sino-Japanese names, others have native Japanese names (yamato kotoba), or a combination of both, the Vietnamese names for these cities are based on the Sino-Vietnamese pronunciations of the kanji used to write their names. However, using the endonym is far more common than the Vietnamese exonym.

== Jordan ==
Jordan Gióc-đan, Gioóc-đa-ni

== Kazakhstan ==
Kazakhstan Ca-dắc-xtan
English name	Vietnamese name	Endonym		Notes
English name	Vietnamese name	Name	Language	
Astana	A-xta-na	Astana (Астана)	Kazakh	

== Kyrgyzstan ==
Kyrgyzstan Cư-rơ-gư-dơ-xtan, Ki-rơ-ghi-zi-a
English name	Vietnamese name	Endonym		Notes
English name	Vietnamese name	Name	Language	
Bishkek	Bi-sơ-kếch	Bishkek (Бишкек)	Kyrgyz	
Bishkek	Bi-sơ-kếch	Bishkek (Бишкек)	Russian	

== Laos ==
Laos Ai Lao, Lào
English name	Vietnamese name	Endonym		Notes
English name	Vietnamese name	Name	Language	
Champasak	Ba Thắc	Cham Pasak (ຈຳ ປາສັກ)	Lao	
Houaphanh	Sầm Châu	Huaphan (ຫົວພັນ)	Lao	
Kingdom of Luang Phrabang	Nam Chưởng			
Khamkeut	Cam Cát	Khamkoed (ຄຳເກີດ)	Lao	
Khammouane	Cam Môn	Kham Muan (ຄຳ ມ່ວນ)	Lao	
Luang Phrabang	Luông Pha Băng, Lão Qua	Luangphabang (ຫລວງພະບາງ)	Lao	
Samneua	Sầm Nứa	Sam Neu (ຊຳ ເໜືອ)	Lao	
Sam Tai	Sầm Tộ	Muang Xam Tai (ຊຳໃຕ້)	Lao	
Vientiane	Vạn Tượng, Viêng Chăn	Viangchan (ວຽງຈັນ)	Lao	Transcription based on native pronunciation as opposed to English spelling
Xiangkhoang	Trấn Ninh	Siangkhuaang (ຊຽງຂວາງ)	Lao	
Xiengkho	Trình Cố	Siangkho (ຊຽງຄໍ້)	Lao	

== Latvia ==
Latvia Lát-vi-a
English name	Vietnamese name	Endonym		Notes
English name	Vietnamese name	Name	Language	
Riga	Ri-ga	Riga	Latvian	

== Libya ==
Libya Li-bi
English name	Vietnamese name	Endonym		Notes
English name	Vietnamese name	Name	Language	
Tripoli	Tri-po-li	Ṭarābulus (طرابلس)	Standard Arabic	

== Lithuania ==
Lithuania Lít-va
English name	Vietnamese name	Endonym		Notes
English name	Vietnamese name	Name	Language	
Vilnius	Vin-ni-út	Vilnius	Lithuanian	

== Luxembourg ==
Luxembourg Lục Xâm Bảo
English name	Vietnamese name	Endonym		Notes
English name	Vietnamese name	Name	Language	
Luxembourg	Thành phố Lúc-xăm-bua	Lëtzebuerg	Luxembourgish	

== Malaysia ==
Malaysia Mã Lai Tây Á, Ma-lai-xi-a
English name	Vietnamese name	Endonym		Notes
English name	Vietnamese name	Name	Language	
Bidong Island	Hòn Rắn	Pulau Bidong	Malay	
Kuala Lumpur	Cát Long Pha	Kuala Lumpur	Malay	
Penang Island	Cù lao Cau	Pulau Pinang	Malay	

== Moldova ==
Moldova Môn-đô-va
English name	Vietnamese name	Endonym		Notes
English name	Vietnamese name	Name	Language	
Chișinău	Ki-si-nhốp	Chișinău	Moldovan	

== Mongolia ==
Mongolia Mông Cổ
English name	Vietnamese name	Endonym		Notes
English name	Vietnamese name	Name	Language	
Ulaanbaatar	Ulan Bato	Ulaanbaatar (Улаанбаатар)	Mongolian Cyrillic	
Ulaanbaatar	Ulan Bato	Ulaghanbaghator (ᠤᠯᠠᠭᠠᠨᠪᠠᠭᠠᠲᠤᠷ)	Mongolian script	

== Montenegro ==
Montenegro Môn-tê-nê-grô
English name	Vietnamese name	Endonym		Notes
English name	Vietnamese name	Name	Language	
Podgorica	Pốt-gô-ri-xa	Podgorica (Подгорица)	Montenegrin	

== Morocco ==
Morocco Ma-rốc
English name	Vietnamese name	Endonym		Notes
English name	Vietnamese name	Name	Language	
Casablanca	Bạch Ốc	ad-Dār al-Bayḍā' (الدار البيضاء) / Kazablanka (كازابلانكا)	Arabic	
Casablanca	Bạch Ốc	Anfa (ⴰⵏⴼⴰ)	Berber languages	
Rabat	Ra-bát	ar-Rabat (الرباط)	Arabic	

== Mexico ==
Mexico Mễ Tây Cơ, Mễ Ti Cơ, Mê-hi-cô
English name	Vietnamese name	Endonym		Notes
English name	Vietnamese name	Name	Language	
Mexico City	Thành phố Mễ Tây Cơ, Mê-hi-cô Xi-ti	Ciudad de México	Spanish	

== Myanmar ==
Myanmar Mi-an-ma, Miến Điện, Diến Điện
English name	Vietnamese name	Endonym		Notes
English name	Vietnamese name	Name	Language	
Naypyidaw	Nây-pi-tô	Nay Pyi Taw (နေပြည်တော်)	Burmese	
Yangon	Ngưỡng Quang, Ragoon	Raankone (ရန်ကုန်)	Burmese	

== Netherlands ==
Netherlands Hà Lan, Hòa Lan, Hoa Lang
English name	Vietnamese name	Endonym		Notes
English name	Vietnamese name	Name	Language	
Amsterdam	Am-tước-đàm, Am-xtéc-đam	Amsterdam	Dutch	
Rotterdam	Luật Tước Đàm	Rotterdam	Dutch	
The Hague	Hạc Phủ	Den Haag	Dutch	

== New Zealand ==
New Zealand Tân Tây Lan, Niu Di-lân
English name	Vietnamese name	Notes
Auckland	Áo Khắc Lan	
Wellington	Oen-ling-tơn	

== North Korea ==
North Korea Bắc Triều Tiên
English name	Vietnamese name	Endonym		Notes
English name	Vietnamese name	Name	Language	
Pyongyang	Bình Nhưỡng	Phyŏngyang (평양)	Korean	
Hamhung	Hàm Hưng	Hamhǔng (함흥)	Korean	
Rason	La Tiên	Rasŏn (라선)	Korean	
Sinuiju	Tân Nghĩa Châu	Sinŭiju (신의주)	Korean	
Kaesong	Khai Thành	Kaesŏng (개성)	Korean	
Chongjin	Thanh Tân	Chŏngjin (청진)	Korean	
Nampo	Nam Phổ	Nampho (남포)	Korean	
Wonsan	Nguyên Sơn	Wŏnsan (원산)	Korean	

== North Macedonia ==
North Macedonia Bắc Macedonia
English name	Vietnamese name	Endonym		Notes
English name	Vietnamese name	Name	Language	
Skopje	Xcốp-pi-ê	Скопје (Skopje)	Macedonian	

== Norway ==
Norway Na Uy
English name	Vietnamese name	Endonym		Notes
English name	Vietnamese name	Name	Language	
Oslo	Ốt-xlô	Oslo	Norwegian	

== Pakistan ==
Pakistan Pa-ki-xtan, Hồi Quốc
English name	Vietnamese name	Endonym		Notes
English name	Vietnamese name	Name	Language	
Islamabad	I-xla-ma-bát	Islamabad (اسلام آباد)	Urdu	

== Philippines ==
Philippines Phi Luật Tân, Phi-líp-pin
English name	Vietnamese name	Endonym		Notes
English name	Vietnamese name	Name	Language	
Manila	Ma Ní	Manila	Tagalog	
Luzon	Lữ Tống	Luzon	Tagalog	

== Poland ==
Poland Ba Lan
English name	Vietnamese name	Endonym		Notes
English name	Vietnamese name	Name	Language	
Warsaw	Vác-sa-va	Warszawa	Polish	

== Portugal ==
Portugal Bồ Đào Nha, Bút Tu Kê
English name	Vietnamese name	Endonym		Notes
English name	Vietnamese name	Name	Language	
Lisbon	Lisboa	Lisboa	Portugal	

== Qatar ==
Qatar Ca-ta

== Romania ==
Romania Ru-ma-ni
English name	Vietnamese name	Endonym		Notes
English name	Vietnamese name	Name	Language	
Bucharest	Bu-ca-rét	București	Romanian	

== Russia ==
Russia Nga La Tư, Nga
English name	Vietnamese name	Endonym		Notes
English name	Vietnamese name	Name	Language	
Kamchatka	Cam-sát-ca	Kamchatka (Камчатка)	Russian	
Kremlin	Điện Cẩm Linh	Kremlin (Кремль)	Russian	
Moscow	Mạc Tư Khoa, Mát-xcơ-va	Moskva (Москва)	Russian	
Novosibirsk	Nô-vô-xi-biếc	Novosibirsk (Новосибирск)	Russian	
Saint Petersburg	Bá Đa Phủ, Bỉ Đắc	Sankt-Peterburg (Санкт-Петербург)	Russian	
Sevastopol	Tô Bồ Lô	Sevastopol' (Севастополь)	Russian	
Siberia	Tây Bá Lợi Á, Xi-bia	Siberia (Сибирь)	Russian	
Vladivostok	Hải Sâm Uy, Thắng Đông, Viễn Đông	Vladivostok (Владивосток)	Russian	
Volga	Phục Nhĩ Gia	Volga (Волга)	Russian	
Volgograd	Vôn-ga-grát	Volgograd (Волгоград)	Russian	

== Saudi Arabia ==
Saudi Arabia Ả Rập Xê Út
English name	Vietnamese name	Endonym		Notes
English name	Vietnamese name	Name	Language	
Riyadh	E-ri-át	ar-Riyadh (لرياض)	Standard Arabic	

== Singapore ==
Singapore Xinh-ga-po, Tân Gia Ba

== South Africa ==
South Africa Nam Phi
English name	Vietnamese name	Endonym		Notes
English name	Vietnamese name	Name	Language	
Bloemfontein	Blô-phông-ten	Bloemfontein	Dutch	
Cape Town	Hảo Vọng Giác, Kếp-tao	Cape Town	English	
Pretoria	Pri-tơ-ri-a	Pretoria	English	

== South Korea ==
South Korea Đại Hàn, Nam Triều Tiên, Hàn Quốc
English name	Vietnamese name	Endonym		Notes
English name	Vietnamese name	Name	Language	
Busan	Phủ Sơn	Busan (부산)	Korean	
Chungju	Trung Châu	Chungju (충주)	Korean	
Daegu	Đại Khâu	Daegu (대구)	Korean	
Gangnam	Giang Nam	Gangnam (강남)	Korean	
Incheon	Nhân Xuyên	Incheon (인천)	Korean	
Jeju	Tế Châu	Jeju (제주)	Korean	
Seoul	Hán Thành; Xơ-un	Hanseong (한성); Seoul (서울)	Korean	

== Spain ==
Spain Tây Ban Nha, Y Pha Nho
English name	Vietnamese name	Endonym		Notes
English name	Vietnamese name	Name	Language	
Alicante	A Li Căn	Alicante	Spanish	
Almansa	An-ma-gia	Almansa	Spanish	
Barcelona	Ba Xà Luân	Barcelona	Spanish	
Cádiz	Ca-đích	Cádiz	Spanish	
Madrid	Ma Địch Lí, Ma Lí, Ma-đrít	Madrid	Spanish	
Menorca	Mi-nô-ca	Menorca	Spanish	
Valencia	Ba-linh-xa	València	Spanish	

== Sri Lanka ==
Sri Lanka Tích Lan, Sai Lăng, Xri Lan-ca
English name	Vietnamese name	Endonym		Notes
English name	Vietnamese name	Name	Language	
Colombo	Kha Luân Bố, Cô-lôm-bô	Kolamba (කොළඹ)	Sinhala	
Colombo	Kha Luân Bố, Cô-lôm-bô	Koḻumpu (கொழும்பு)	Tamil	

== Sweden ==
Sweden Thụy Điển, Xu Y Đà
English name	Vietnamese name	Endonym		Notes
English name	Vietnamese name	Name	Language	
Stockholm	Tốc Hàm, Xtốc-khôm	Stockholm	Swedish	

== Switzerland ==
Switzerland Thụy Sĩ
English name	Vietnamese name	Endonym		Notes
English name	Vietnamese name	Name	Language	
Bern	Bơn	Bern	German	
Bern	Bơn	Bärn	Alemannic German	
Bern	Bơn	Berne	French	
Bern	Bơn	Berna	Italian	
Bern	Bơn	Berna	Romansch	
Geneva	Genève	Genève	French	

== Taiwan ==
Taiwan Đài Loan
English name	Vietnamese name	Endonym		Notes
English name	Vietnamese name	Name	Language	
Hualien	Hoa Liên	Huālián (花蓮)	Mandarin	
Kaohsiung	Cao Hùng	Gāoxióng (高雄)	Mandarin	
Keelung	Cơ Long	Jīlóng (基隆)	Mandarin	
Taichung	Đài Trung	Táizhōng (台中 / 臺中)	Mandarin	
Tainan	Đài Nam	Táinán (台南 / 臺南)	Mandarin	
Taipei	Đài Bắc	Táiběi (台北 / 臺北)	Mandarin	
Taitung	Đài Đông	Táidōng (台东 / 臺東)	Mandarin	

== Thailand ==
Thailand (Thái Lan, Thái Quốc)
English name	Vietnamese name	Endonym		Notes
English name	Vietnamese name	Name	Language	
Ayutthaya	Thượng Thành	Ayutthaya (อยุธยา)	Thai	
Bangkok	Vọng Các, Băng Cốc	Krung Thep (กรุงเทพ)	Thai	
Chanthaburi	Chân Bôn	Chanthaburi (จันทบุรี)	Thai	
Chiang Mai	Chiêng Mài, Xương Mại	Chiang Mai (เชียงใหม่)	Thai	
Chiang Rai	Chiềng Rai	Chiang Rai (เชียงราย)	Thai	
Chiang Rai	Chiềng Hai	Jiang Hai (ᨩ᩠ᨿᨦᩁᩣ᩠ᨿ)	Northern Thai	
Ko Chang	Dương Khảm	Ko Chang (เกาะช้าง)	Thai	
Ko Kut	Cổ Cốt	Ko Kut (เกาะกูด)	Thai	
Lopburi	La Hộc	Lop Buri (ลพบุรี)	Thai	
Nakhon Phanom	Na Khổng Phù Nam	Nakhon Phanom (นครพนม)	Thai	
Nakhon Ratchasima	Cổ Lạc	Nakhon Ratchasima (นครราชสีมา)	Thai	
Nakhon Si Thammarat	Na Khổng Tam Hoạt	Nakhon Si Thammarat (นครศรีธรรมราช)	Thai	
Nongkhai	Mường Nông	Nongkhai (หนองคาย)	Thai	
Pattani	Tà Nê	Pattani (ปัตตานี)	Thai	
Sukhothai	Xụ-khổ-thay	Sukhothai (สุโขทัย)	Thai	

== Tajikistan ==
Tajikistan
English name	Vietnamese name	Endonym		Notes
English name	Vietnamese name	Name	Language	
Dushanbe	Đu-san-be	Dushanbe (Душанбе)	Tajik	

== Timor-Leste ==
Timor-Leste Đông Ti-mo, Đông Timor, Ti-mo Le-xte
English name	Vietnamese name	Endonym		Notes
English name	Vietnamese name	Name	Language	
Dili	Đi-li	Dili	Tetum	

== Tunisia ==
Tunisia Tuy-ni-di
English name	Vietnamese name	Endonym		Notes
English name	Vietnamese name	Name	Language	
Tunis	Tuy-nít	Tunis (تونس)	Standard Arabic	

== Turkey ==
Turkey Thổ Nhĩ Kỳ, Tu-ru-cô, Tu-ru-ky
English name	Vietnamese name	Endonym		Notes
English name	Vietnamese name	Name	Language	
Ephesus	Ê-phê-sô	Efes	Turkish	
Istanbul	Tân La Mã	İstanbul	Turkish	

== Ukraine ==
Ukraine U-crai-na, Ukraina
English name	Vietnamese name	Endonym		Notes
English name	Vietnamese name	Name	Language	
Kyiv	Cơ Phụ, Ki-ép	Kyiv (Київ)	Ukrainian	

== United Arab Emirates ==
United Arab Emirates Các Tiểu vương quốc Ả Rập Thống nhất
English name	Vietnamese name	Endonym		Notes
English name	Vietnamese name	Name	Language	
Abu Dhabi	ʼAbū Ẓaby	Abu Dhabi (أبوظبي)	Arabic	
Dubai	Đu-bai	Dubey (دبيّ)	Arabic	

== United Kingdom ==
United Kingdom Đại Anh, Anh Cát Lợi, Anh, Anh Quốc, Vương quốc Anh, Liên hiệp Anh
English name	Vietnamese name	Endonym		Notes
English name	Vietnamese name	Name	Language	
Edinburgh	Ê-đin-brơ	Edinburgh	English	
Edinburgh	Ê-đin-brơ	Edinburgh	Scots	
England	Anh Cát Lợi, Hồng Mao	England	English	
Northern Ireland	Bắc Ái Nhĩ Lan	Northern Ireland	English	
London	Luân Đôn, Long-đôn	London	English	
Scotland	Tô Cách Lan, Y Cốt, Xcốt-len, Scôtlen	Scotland	English	
Wales	Uy Nhĩ Sĩ, Huệ Châu, xứ Gan, xứ Wales	Wales	English	

== United States ==
United States Á Mĩ Lợi Gia, Mỹ, Hoa Kỳ
English name	Vietnamese name	Notes
Arlington, VA	Ái Linh Tân	
Arlington, TX	Ái Linh Tân	
Baltimore	Bạt Đế Mỗ	
Boston	Bật Tân	
California	Ca-li, Ca-li-ni-a, Ca-li-phoóc-nha	
Chicago	Chi Gia Kha	
Harlem	Hắc Lem	
Hawaii	Hạ Uy Di	
Hollywood	Hoa Lệ Ước, Hồ Ly Vọng	
Honolulu	Hòn Lau	
Los Angeles	Lốt, Lộc Án Gia Lê	
Manhattan	Mã Nhật Tân	
New Orleans	Ngọc Lân, Tân Linh	
New York	Nữu Ước, Niu Gioóc, Tiểu bang New York	
New York City	Thành phố New York	
North Carolina	Bắc Carolina	
North Dakota	Bắc Dakota	
Orange County	Quận Cam	
Philadelphia	Huynh Đệ thành	
San Francisco	Cựu Kim Sơn, Xăng Phăng, Phàn thành	
Seven Corners	Ngã Bảy	
South Carolina	Nam Carolina	
South Dakota	Nam Dakota	
Washington	Hoa Thịnh Đốn, Hoa Sinh Tân	
Washington, D.C.	Oa-xinh-tơn	
West Virginia	Tây Virginia	

The most common name for America in Vietnamese, Hoa Kỳ, means "Flower Flag" in Vietnamese, in reference to the United States' flag.

== Uzbekistan ==
Uzbekistan
English name	Vietnamese name	Endonym		Notes
English name	Vietnamese name	Name	Language	
Tashkent	Ta-sơ-ken	Toshkent	Uzbek	

== Other ==
English name	Vietnamese name	Notes
Alps	Ân Lô Bi, An-pơ, dãy Anpơ	
Annamite Mountains	Dãy (núi) Trường Sơn	
Aral Sea	Hàm Hải, Biển Aral	
Atlantic Ocean	Đại Tây Dương	
Dead Sea	Biển Chết	
East China Sea	Biển Hoa Đông	
Euphrates	Uông Phát, Ơ-phơ-rát, sông Euphrates	
Mount Everest	đỉnh Everest	
Himalayas	Hi Mã Lạp Sơn, dãy Himalaya, Tuyết Sơn	
Indian Ocean	Ấn Độ Dương	
Indus River	Sông Ấn (Độ)	
Issyk-Kul	Nhiệt Hải, hồ Issyk-Kul	
Mediterranean Sea	(Biển) Địa Trung Hải	
Mekong River	Mê Kông, Cửu Long	
Nile River	Sông Nin, sông Nhĩ Lô, Nhĩ Hà	
Pacific Ocean	Thái Bình Dương	
Palestine	Ba-lạc-đĩnh, vùng Palestine	
Persian Gulf	Vịnh Ba Tư	
Red Sea	Xích hải, Hồng Hải, Biển Đỏ	
Rocky Mountains	Thạch Sơn, dãy núi Rocky	
Sahara Desert	Sa mạc Lớn, Sa mạc Sahara	
Sea of Japan	Biển Nhật Bản	See also: Sea of Japan naming dispute
Sunda Strait	Cửa Song Đề, eo biển Sunda	
South China Sea	Hoa Nam hải, Đông hải (from East Sea), Biển Đông	
Tigris	Tích Giang, Ti-gơ-rơ, Tigrơ, sông Tigris	
Baltic Sea	Ba La Đích hải, biển Baltic	
