= List of protected heritage sites in Messancy =

This table shows an overview of the protected heritage sites in the Walloon town Messancy. This list is part of Belgium's national heritage.

Object	Year/architect	Town/section	Address	Coordinates	Number^{?}	Image
Calvary (see Stations of the Cross), next to the building No. 83 ^{(nl)} ^{(fr)}		Messancy	rue Albert Ier, Buvange	49.626163°N 5.798989°E	81015-CLT-0001-01 Info	Calvarie, naast het pand nr. 83
Calvary Saint-Nicolas, in the middle of the intersection of the streets and rue des Rochers Theisen in Hondelange ^{(nl)} ^{(fr)}		Messancy		49.633306°N 5.834197°E	81015-CLT-0002-01 Info	
Four calvaries: remains of a seven-station procession path with Stations of the Cross ^{(nl)} ^{(fr)}		Messancy	Wolkrange	49.632223°N 5.803573°E	81015-CLT-0003-01 Info	Vier calvaries: overblijfselen van een kruisweg met zeven stations
Calvary, at the corner of the roads rue Concordia and rue des Bles d'Or ^{(nl)} ^{(fr)}		Messancy		49.633639°N 5.832274°E	81015-CLT-0004-01 Info	
Calvary ^{(nl)} ^{(fr)}		Messancy	rue Concardia face au n°11	49.633205°N 5.831605°E	81015-CLT-0005-01 Info	Calvarie
Calvary ^{(nl)} ^{(fr)}		Messancy	rue de la Chapelle	49.634154°N 5.828580°E	81015-CLT-0006-01 Info	
Calvary, at the corner of the roads rue Concordia and rue de la Chapelle ^{(nl)} ^{(fr)}		Messancy		49.633088°N 5.831177°E	81015-CLT-0007-01 Info	Calvarie, op de hoek van de wegen rue Concordia en rue de la Chapelle
Calvary ^{(nl)} ^{(fr)}		Messancy	rue de la Chapelle, face au n°64	49.635233°N 5.823831°E	81015-CLT-0008-01 Info	
Calvary near the chapel of Sainte-Croix ^{(nl)} ^{(fr)}		Messancy	rue de la chapelle	49.635533°N 5.820216°E	81015-CLT-0009-01 Info	Calvarie in de buurt van de kapel Sainte-Croix
Calvary ^{(nl)} ^{(fr)}		Messancy	rue de la Chapelle, op de gevel van n°24	49.635479°N 5.818558°E	81015-CLT-0010-01 Info	Calvarie
Calvary at the front of the church ^{(nl)} ^{(fr)}		Messancy	Habergy	49.614370°N 5.759050°E	81015-CLT-0011-01 Info	Calvarie aan de voorzijde van de kerk
Calvary of Trinité ^{(nl)} ^{(fr)}		Messancy	rue de la Halte, Turpange	49.611827°N 5.818930°E	81015-CLT-0012-01 Info	Calvarie van Trinité
Calvary ^{(nl)} ^{(fr)}		Messancy	rue Neuve	49.593884°N 5.816155°E	81015-CLT-0013-01 Info	Calvarie
Calvary located at the front of the house located at Grand Rue 56, in the beginning of the Rue de la Trinité ^{(nl)} ^{(fr)}		Messancy		49.592643°N 5.815114°E	81015-CLT-0014-01 Info	Calvarie gelegen tegen de voorkant van het huis gelegen op Grand Rue 56, in het begin van de Rue de la Trinite
Calvary leaning against the right side of the wall of the room Concordia ^{(nl)} ^{(fr)}		Messancy	rue des Chasseurs Ardennais	49.592947°N 5.816191°E	81015-CLT-0015-01 Info	Calvarie steunend tegen de rechterkant van de muur van de kamer Concordia
Calvary in Longeau (located at the intersection of the roads to Guerlange and to Longeau) ^{(nl)} ^{(fr)}		Messancy		49.580155°N 5.841327°E	81015-CLT-0016-01 Info	Calvarie te Longeau (gelegen op het kruispunt van de weg van Guerlange en twee wegen naar Longeau)
Calvary located on the island in Longeau formed by the road that leads to Clemency and the road to Longeau when leaving the village Selange ^{(nl)} ^{(fr)}		Messancy		49.603841°N 5.853642°E	81015-CLT-0017-01 Info	Calvarie gelegen op het eiland dat wordt gevormd door de weg die leidt tot Clemency en deze te Longeau en Messancy bij het verlaten van het dorp Sélange

== See also ==
- List of protected heritage sites in Luxembourg (Belgium)
- Messancy
