= Endonym and exonym =

Categories in etymology

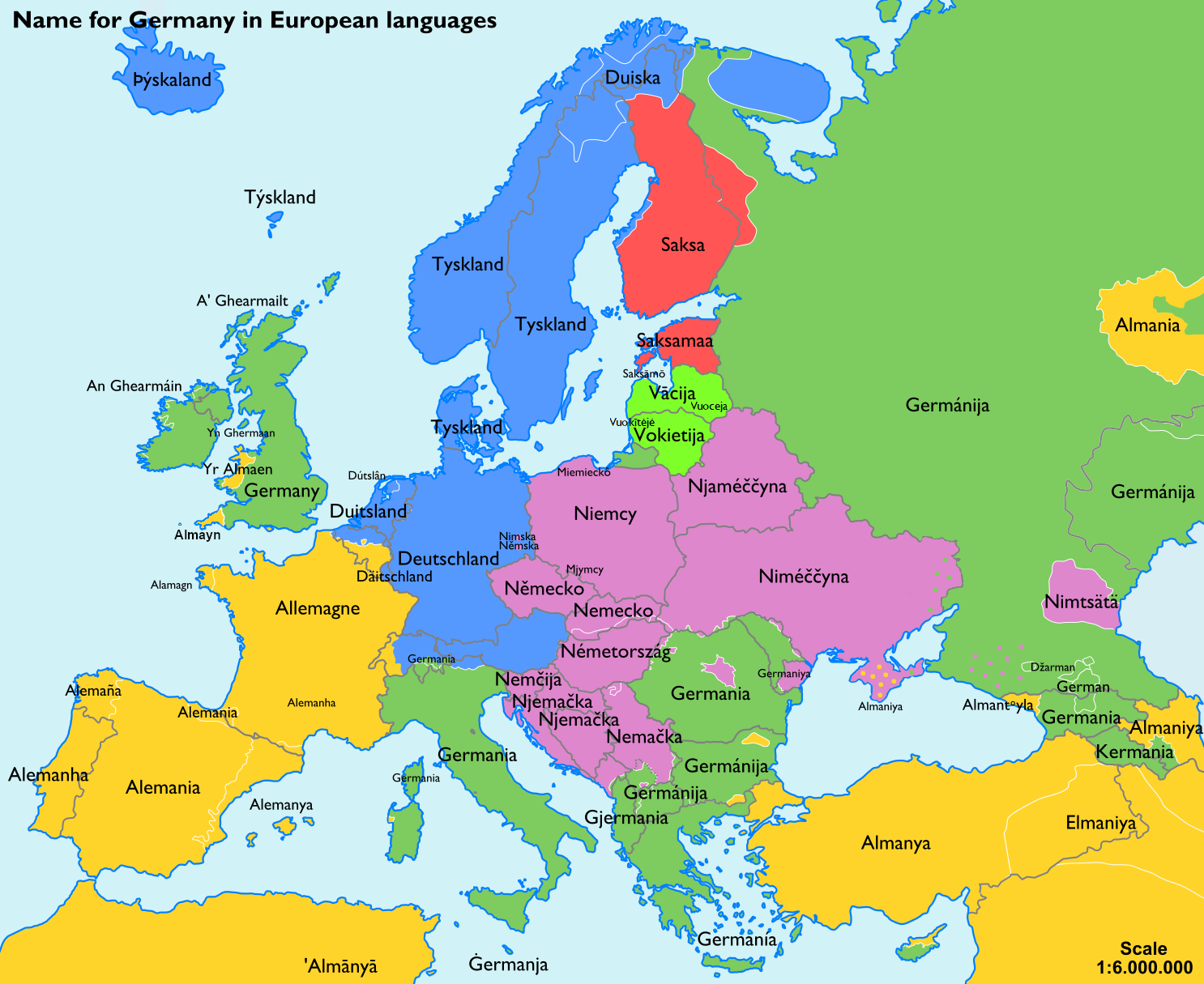
A map demonstrating the wide diversity of exonyms for Germany, compared to blue for names related to the modern German language endonym of Deutschland [country of the people]. Yellow descend from Latin Alemanni, a tribal confederation around the Danube meaning 'everyone'; dark green from Latin Germāni, a name for tribal groups in Northern Europe; red is Saxon; light green of uncertain origin; and purple is a Slavic term meaning 'mute'.

An endonym (Note: /ˈɛndənɪm/ EN-də-nim) or autonym (Note: /ˈɔːtənɪm/ AW-tə-nim) is a common, self-chosen, native name of a group of people, an individual person of that group, a geographical place, a language or a dialect; it is 'native' in the sense that it is used inside or by a particular group or linguistic community to identify or designate themselves, their place of origin, or their language.

An exonym (Note: /ˈɛɡzənɪm/ EG-zə-nim) or xenonym (Note: /ˈzɛnənɪm/ ZEN-ə-nim) is a foreign-established, non-native name for a group of people, an individual person of that group, a geographical place, a language, or a dialect, meaning that it is used primarily outside the particular place inhabited by the group or linguistic community. Exonyms exist not only for historico-geographical reasons but also in consideration of difficulties when pronouncing foreign words, or from non-systematic or failed attempts to properly and faithfully transcribe and translate local-originated names into different writing systems.

For instance, Deutschland is the endonym for the country that is also known by the exonyms Germany and Germania (in English and Italian, respectively), Alemania and Allemagne (in Spanish and French, respectively), Niemcy (in Polish), and Saksa and Saksamaa (in Finnish and Estonian, respectively).

== Naming and etymology ==
The terms autonym, endonym, exonym and xenonym are formed by adding specific prefixes to the Greek root word ὄνομα (ónoma) 'name', from Proto-Indo-European *h₃nómn̥.

The prefixes added to these terms are also derived from Greek:

- endonym: ἔνδον (éndon) 'within';
- exonym: ἔξω (éxō) 'outside';
- autonym: αὐτός (autós) 'self'; and
- xenonym: ξένος (xénos) 'foreign'.

The terms autonym and xenonym also have different applications, thus leaving endonym and exonym as the preferred forms.

Marcel Aurousseau, an Australian geographer, first used the term exonym in his work The Rendering of Geographical Names (1957).

== Typology ==
Endonyms and exonyms can be divided into three main categories:

- endonyms and exonyms of places (toponyms),
- endonyms and exonyms of humans (anthroponyms), including names of ethnic groups (ethnonyms), localised populations (demonyms), and individuals (personal names),
- endonyms and exonyms of languages (glossonyms).

=== Endonyms and exonyms of toponyms ===
As it pertains to geographical features, the United Nations Group of Experts on Geographical Names defines:

- Endonym: "Name of a geographical feature in an official or well-established language occurring in that area where the feature is located."
- Exonym: "Name used in a specific language for a geographical feature situated outside the area where that language is spoken, and differing in its form from the name used in an official or well-established language of that area where the geographical feature is located."

For example, India, China, Egypt, and Germany are the English-language exonyms corresponding to the endonyms Bhārat (भारत), Zhōngguó (中国), Masr (مَصر), and Deutschland, respectively. There are also typonyms of specific features, for example hydronyms for bodies of water.

=== Endonyms and exonyms of glossonyms ===
In the case of endonyms and exonyms of language names (glossonyms), Chinese, German, and Dutch, for example, are English-language exonyms for the languages that are endonymously known as Zhōngwén (中文), Deutsch, and Nederlands, respectively.

== Exonyms in relation to endonyms ==
By their relation to endonyms, all exonyms can be divided into three main categories:

- those that are cognate words, diverged only in pronunciation or orthography;
- those that are fully or partially translated (a calque) from the native language;
- those derived from different roots, as in the case of Germany for Deutschland.

Sometimes, a place name may be unable to use many of the letters when transliterated into an exonym because of the corresponding language's lack of common sounds. Māori, having only one liquid consonant, is an example of this.

=== Cognate exonyms ===
London (originally Latin: Londinium), for example, is known by the cognate exonyms:

- Londres in Basque, Catalan, Filipino, French, Galician, Portuguese, and Spanish;
- Λονδίνο (Greek pronunciation: [lon'ðino]) in Greek;
- Londen in Dutch and Afrikaans;
- Londra in Italian, Maltese, Romanian, Romansh, Sardinian and Turkish;
- Londër in Albanian;
- Londýn in Czech and Slovak;
- Londyn in Polish;
- Rānana in Māori;
- Lundúnir in Icelandic;
- Londain in Irish;
- Lunnainn in Scottish Gaelic;
- Llundain in Welsh;
- Lontoo in Finnish;
- Luân Đôn in Vietnamese;
- لندن (Landan) in Persian, Arabic, and Urdu;
- 伦敦 Lúndūn in Chinese.

=== Translated exonyms ===
An example of a translated exonym is the name for the Netherlands (Nederland in Dutch) used, respectively, in German (Niederlande), French (Pays-Bas), Italian (Paesi Bassi), Spanish (Países Bajos), Irish (An Ísiltír), Portuguese (Países Baixos), Romanian (Țările de Jos) and Czech (Nizozemsko), all of which mean "Low Countries". However, the endonym Nederland is singular, while all the aforementioned translations except Irish and Czech are plural (the French translation being the same in singular and plural).

=== Native and borrowed exonyms ===
Exonyms can also be divided into native and borrowed, e.g., from a third language. For example, the Slovene exonyms Dunaj (Vienna) and Benetke (Venice) are native, but the Avar name of Paris, Париж (Parizh) is borrowed from Russian Париж (Parizh), which comes from Polish Paryż, which comes from Italian Parigi.

A substantial proportion of English-language exonyms for places in continental Europe are borrowed (or adapted) from French; for example:

- Belgrade (Serbian: Београд, romanized: Beograd);
- Bucharest (Romanian: București);
- Cologne (German: Köln / Kölsch: Kölle);
- Florence (Italian: Firenze);
- Milan (Italian: Milano);
- Munich (German: München / Bavarian: Minga);
- Naples (Italian: Napoli / Neapolitan: Napule);
- Navarre (Spanish: Navarra / Basque: Nafarroa);
- Prague (Czech: Praha);
- Rome (Italian: Roma); and
- Seville (Spanish: Sevilla).

A lot of exonyms for places are borrowed but adapted to the target language's conventions, such as keyboard layout. For example diacritical marks such as two dots above are stripped when English-language media write about them. Transliterations take place if another alphabet is used originally. Pronunciations are also often adapted.

== Typical development of exonyms ==
Many exonyms result from adaptations of an endonym into another language, mediated by differences in phonetics, while others may result from translation of the endonym, or as a reflection of the specific relationship an outsider group has with a local place or geographical feature.

According to James Matisoff, who introduced the term autonym into linguistics, exonyms can also arise from the "egocentric" tendency of in-groups to identify themselves with "mankind in general", producing an endonym that out groups would not use, while another source is the human tendency towards neighbours to "be pejorative rather than complimentary, especially where there is a real or fancied difference in cultural level between the ingroup and the outgroup." For example, Matisoff notes, Khang "an opprobrious term indicating mixed race or parentage" is the Palaung name for Jingpo people and the Jingpo name for Chin people; both the Jingpo and Burmese use the Chinese word yeren (野人; 'wild men', 'savage', 'rustic people') as the name for Lisu people.

As exonyms develop for places of significance for speakers of the language of the exonym, consequently, many European capitals have English exonyms, for example:

- Athens (Greek: Αθήνα, romanized: Athína);
- Belgrade (Serbian: Београд, romanized: Beograd);
- Bucharest (Romanian: București);
- Brussels (French: Bruxelles, Dutch: Brussel);
- Copenhagen (Danish: København);
- Lisbon (Portuguese: Lisboa);
- Moscow (Russian: Москва, romanized: Moskva);
- Prague (Czech: Praha);
- Rome (Italian: Roma);
- Vienna (German: Wien); and
- Warsaw (Polish: Warszawa).

In contrast, historically less-prominent capitals such as Ljubljana and Zagreb do not have English exonyms, but do have exonyms in languages spoken nearby, e.g., German: Laibach and Agram (the latter being obsolete); Italian: Lubiana and Zagabria. Madrid, Berlin, Oslo, and Amsterdam, with identical names in most major European languages, are exceptions.

Some European cities might be considered partial exceptions, in that whilst the spelling is the same across languages, the pronunciation can differ. For example, the city of Paris is spelled the same way in French and English, but the French pronunciation [paʁi] is different from the English pronunciation [ˈpærɪs].

For places considered to be of lesser significance, attempts to reproduce local names have been made in English since the time of the Crusades. Livorno, for instance, was Leghorn because it was an Italian port essential to English merchants and, by the 18th century, to the British Navy; not far away, Rapallo, a minor port on the same sea, never received an exonym.

In earlier times, the name of the first tribe or village encountered became the exonym for the whole people beyond. Thus, the Romans used the tribal names Graecus (Greek) and Germanus (Germanic), the Russians used the village name of Chechen, medieval Europeans took the tribal name Tatar as emblematic for the whole Mongolic confederation (and then confused it with Tartarus, a word for Hell, to produce Tartar), and the Magyar invaders were equated with the 500-years-earlier Hunnish invaders in the same territory, and were called Hungarians.

The Germanic invaders of the Roman Empire applied the word "Walha" to foreigners they encountered and this evolved in West Germanic languages as a generic name for speakers of Celtic and later (as Celts became increasingly romanised) Romance languages; thence:

- Wallachia, the historic name of Romania inhabited by the Vlachs
- The Slavic term Vlah for "Romanian", dialectally "Italian, Latin"; additionally Vlaška means "Wallachia" in Serbo-Croatian and "Italian woman" in Czech
- Wallonia, the French-speaking region of Belgium
- Cornwall and Wales, the Celtic-speaking regions located west of the Anglo-Saxon-dominated England
- Wallis, a mostly French-speaking canton in Switzerland
- Welschland, the German name for the French-speaking Switzerland
- the Polish and Hungarian names for Italy, Włochy and Olaszország respectively

== Usage ==
=== In avoiding exonyms ===
During the late 20th century, the use of exonyms sometimes became controversial. Groups often prefer that outsiders avoid exonyms where they have come to be used in a pejorative way. For example, Romani people often prefer that term (Romani) over exonyms such as Gypsy (from the name of Egypt) or the French term bohémien, bohème (from the name of Bohemia). People may also avoid exonyms for reasons of historical sensitivity, as in the case of German names for Polish and Czech places that, at one time, had been ethnically or politically German (e.g. Danzig/Gdańsk, Auschwitz/Oświęcim and Karlsbad/Karlovy Vary) or Russian names for non-Russian locations that regained their local name (e.g. Kiev/Kyiv).

In recent years, geographers have sought to reduce the use of exonyms to avoid this kind of problem. For example, it is now common for Spanish speakers to refer to the Turkish capital as Ankara rather than use the Spanish exonym Angora. Another example, it is now common for Italian speakers to refer to some African states as Mauritius and Seychelles rather than use the Italian exonyms Maurizio and Seicelle. According to the United Nations Statistics Division:

Time has, however, shown that initial ambitious attempts to rapidly decrease the number of exonyms were over-optimistic and not possible to realise in an intended way. The reason would appear to be that many exonyms have become common words in a language and can be seen as part of the language's cultural heritage.

=== In preference of exonyms ===
In some situations, the use of exonyms can be preferred. For instance, in multilingual cities such as Brussels, which is known for its linguistic tensions between Dutch- and French-speakers, a neutral name may be preferred so as to not offend anyone. Thus, an exonym such as Brussels in English could be used instead of favoring either one of the local names (Dutch/Flemish: Brussel; French: Bruxelles).

Other difficulties with endonyms have to do with pronunciation, spelling, and word category. The endonym may include sounds and spellings that are highly unfamiliar to speakers of other languages, making appropriate usage difficult if not impossible for an outsider. Over the years, the endonym may have undergone phonetic changes, either in the original language or the borrowing language, thus changing an endonym into an exonym, as in the case of Paris, where the s was formerly pronounced in French. Another example is the endonym for the German city of Cologne, where the Latin original of Colonia has evolved into Köln in German, while the Italian and Spanish exonym Colonia or the Portuguese exonym Colónia closely reflect the Latin original.

In some cases, no standardised spelling is available, either because the language itself is unwritten (even unanalysed) or because there are competing non-standard spellings. Use of a misspelled endonym is perhaps more problematic than the respectful use of an existing exonym. Finally, an endonym may be a plural noun and may not naturally extend itself to adjectival usage in another language like English, which has the propensity to use the adjectives for describing culture and language.

=== Official preferences ===
Sometimes the government of a country tries to endorse the use of an endonym instead of traditional exonyms outside the country:

- In 1782, King Yotfa Chulalok of Siam moved the government seat from Thon Buri Province to Phra Nakhon Province. In 1972 the Thai government merged Thon Buri and Phra Nakhon, forming the new capital, Krungthep Mahanakhon. However, outside of Thailand, the capital retained the old name and is still called Bangkok.
- In 1935, Reza Shah requested that foreign nations use the name Iran rather than Persia in official correspondence. (See Name of Iran.) The name of the country had internally been Iran since the time of the Sassanid Empire (224–651), whereas the name Persia is descended from Greek Persis (Περσίς), referring to a single province which is officially known as Fars province.
- In 1939, the government of Siam changed the name to Thailand, although the former name's adjective in English (Siamese) was retained as the name for the fish, cat and conjoined twins.
- In 1972, the government of Ceylon (the word is the anglicized form of Portuguese Ceilão) changed the name to Sri Lanka, although the name Ceylon was retained as the name for the type of tea. (See Names of Sri Lanka.)
- In 1989, the government of Burma requested that the English name of the country be Myanmar, with Myanma as the adjective of the country and Bamar as the name of the inhabitants. (See Names of Burma.)
- The Ukrainian government maintains that the capital of Ukraine should be spelled Kyiv in English because the traditional English exonym Kiev was derived from the Russian name Kiyev (Киев). (See Name of Kyiv.)
- The Belarusian government argues that the endonym Belarus should be used in all languages. The result has been rather successful in English, where the former exonym Byelorussia/Belorussia, still used with reference to the Soviet Republic, has virtually died out; in other languages, exonyms are still much more common than Belarus, for instance in Danish Hviderusland, Dutch Wit-Rusland, Estonian Valgevene, Faroese Hvítarussland, Finnish Valko-Venäjä, German Weißrussland, Greek Lefkorosía (Λευκορωσία), Hungarian Fehéroroszország, Icelandic Hvíta-Rússland, Swedish Vitryssland, Turkish Beyaz Rusya, Chinese Bái'èluósī (白俄罗斯), Arabic rusia albayda' (روسيا البيضاء) (all literally 'White Russia'), or French Biélorussie, Italian Bielorussia, Portuguese Bielorrússia, Spanish Bielorrusia, and Serbian Belorusija (Белорусија).
- In 2006, the South Korean national government officially changed the Chinese name of its capital, Seoul, from the exonym 漢城/汉城 (Hànchéng) derived from the Joseon era Hanja name (Korean: 한성; Hanja: 漢城; RR: Hanseong) to Shǒu'ěr (首爾/首尔). This use has now been made official within China.
- In December 2021, a circular was issued by President Recep Tayyip Erdoğan of Turkey ordering the use of Türkiye (also rendered Turkiye in English) instead of assimilated forms of that name in official communications, no matter the language. Although "Turkey" is the English form of the endonym, its use for the bird (which was named after the country) is considered unflattering. (See Name of Turkey.)
- Istanbul (Turkish: İstanbul) is still called Constantinople (Κωνσταντινούπολη) in Greek, although the name was changed between 1923 and 1930 in Turkish to dissociate the city from its Greek past. (The name Istanbul itself may derive from Constantinople. Prior to Constantinople, the city was known in Greek as Byzantion (Greek: Βυζάντιον, Latin: Byzantium), named after its mythical founder, Byzas.)

In other cases one exonym is preferred to another:

- In 1985, the government of Côte d'Ivoire requested that the country's French name be used in all languages instead of translations such as Ivory Coast, so that Côte d'Ivoire is now the official English name of that country in the United Nations and the International Olympic Committee. (See Name of Côte d'Ivoire.) In most non-Francophone countries, however, the French version has not entered common parlance. For example, in German, the country is known as die Elfenbeinküste, in Spanish as Costa de Marfil and in Italian as Costa d'Avorio.
- The Government of India officially changed the English name of Bombay to Mumbai, a newly invented name purported to be an endonym, in November 1995, following a trend of renaming of cities and states in India that has occurred since independence.
- The government of Georgia has been working to have the country renamed from the Russian-derived exonym of Gruzia in foreign languages to Georgia. Most countries have adopted this change, except for Lithuania, which adopted Sakartvelas (a Lithuanianised version of the country's endonym). As a response, Georgia changed the name of Lithuania in Georgian from the Russian-derived Lit’va (ლიტვა) to the endonym Liet’uva (ლიეტუვა). Ukrainian politicians have also suggested that Ukraine change the Ukrainian name of Georgia from Hruzia (Грузія) to Sakartvelo (Сакартвело).

=== Hanyu Pinyin ===
Following the 1979 declaration of Hanyu Pinyin spelling as the standard romanisation of Chinese, many Chinese endonyms have successfully replaced English exonyms, especially city and most provincial names in mainland China, for example: Beijing (北京; Běijīng), Qingdao (青岛; Qīngdǎo), and the province of Guangdong (广东; Guǎngdōng). However, older English exonyms are sometimes used in certain contexts, for example: Peking (Beijing; duck, opera, University, etc.), Tsingtao (Qingdao), and Canton (Guangdong). In some cases the traditional English exonym is based on a local Chinese variety instead of Mandarin, in the case of Xiamen, where the name Amoy is closer to the Hokkien pronunciation.

In the case of Beijing, the adoption of the endonym by media outlets quickly gave rise to a hyperforeignism, with the result that many English speakers actualize the j in Beijing as /ʒ/. One exception of Pinyin standardization in mainland China is the spelling of the province Shaanxi, which is the mixed Gwoyeu Romatzyh–Pinyin spelling of the province. That is because if Pinyin were used to spell the province, it would be indistinguishable from its neighboring province Shanxi, where the pronunciations of the two provinces only differ by tones, which are usually not written down when used in English.

In Taiwan, however, the standardization of Hanyu Pinyin has only seen mixed results. In Taipei, most (but not all) street and district names shifted to Hanyu Pinyin. For example, the Sinyi District is now spelled Xinyi. However, districts like Tamsui and even Taipei itself are not spelled according to Hanyu Pinyin spelling rules. As a matter of fact, most names of Taiwanese cities are still spelled using Chinese postal romanization, including Taipei, Taichung, Taitung, Keelung, and Kaohsiung.

During the 1980s, the Singapore Government encouraged the use of Hanyu Pinyin spelling for place names, especially those with Teochew, Hokkien or Cantonese names, as part of the Speak Mandarin Campaign to promote Mandarin and discourage the use of "dialects". For example, the area of Nee Soon, named after Teochew-Peranakan businessman Lim Nee Soon (林義順, Teochew Peng'im: lim5 ngi6 sung6, Mandarin Pinyin: Lín Yìshùn) became Yishun and the neighbourhood schools and places established following the change used the Hanyu Pinyin spelling. In contrast, Hougang is the Hanyu Pinyin spelling but the Hokkien pronunciation Aū-káng is most commonly used. The changes to Hanyu Pinyin were not only financially costly but were unpopular with the locals, who opined that the Hanyu Pinyin versions were too difficult for non-Chinese or non-Mandarin speakers to pronounce. The government eventually stopped the changes by the 1990s, which has led to some place names within a locality having differing spellings. For example, Nee Soon Road, Nee Soon Group Representation Constituency, and the Singapore Armed Forces base Nee Soon Camp are all located in Yishun but retained the old spelling.

== Exonyms as pejoratives ==
Matisoff wrote, "A group's autonym is often egocentric, equating the name of the people with 'mankind in general,' or the name of the language with 'human speech'."

In Basque, the term erdara/erdera is used for speakers of any language other than Basque (usually Spanish or French).

Ancient Greeks thought that all non-Greeks were uncultured and so called them "barbarians", which eventually gave rise to the exonym "Berber".

=== Slavic people ===
Exonyms often describe others as "foreign-speaking", "non-speaking", or "nonsense-speaking". One example is the Slavic term for the Germans, *nemtsi, possibly deriving from plural of *nemy ("mute"); standard etymology has it that the Slavic peoples referred to their Germanic neighbors as "mutes" because they could not speak the "language". The term survives to this day in the Slavic languages (e.g. Ukrainian німці (nimtsi); Russian немцы (nemtsy), Slovene Nemci (nemsty)), and was borrowed into Hungarian, Romanian, and Ottoman Turkish (in which case it referred specifically to Austria).

One of the more prominent theories regarding the origin of the term "Slav" suggests that it comes from the Slavic root *slovo (hence "Slovakia" and "Slovenia" for example), meaning 'word' or 'speech'. In this context, the Slavs are describing Germanic people as "mutes"—in contrast to themselves, "the speaking ones".

=== Native Americans ===
The most common names of several Indigenous American tribes derive from pejorative exonyms. The name "Apache" most likely derives from a Zuni word meaning "enemy". The name "Sioux", an abbreviated form of Nadouessioux, most likely derived from a Proto-Algonquian term, *-a·towe· ('foreign-speaking). The name "Comanche" comes from the Ute word kɨmantsi meaning "enemy, stranger". The Ancestral Puebloans are also known as the "Anasazi", a Navajo word meaning "ancient enemies", and contemporary Puebloans discourage the use of the exonym in favor of "Ancestral Puebloan."

Various Native-American autonyms are sometimes explained to English readers as having literal translations of "original people" or "normal people", with implicit contrast to other first nations as not original or not normal.

== Confusion with renaming ==
Following independence from the UK in 1947, many regions and cities have been renamed in accordance with local languages, or to change the English spelling to more closely match the indigenous local name. The name Madras, now Chennai, may be a special case. When the city was first settled by English people, in the early 17th century, both names were in use. They may have referred to different villages which were fused into the new settlement. In any case, Madras became the exonym, while more recently, Chennai became the endonym. Madrasi, a term for a native of the city, has often been used derogatorily to refer to the people of Dravidian origin from the southern states of India.

== Lists of exonyms ==
- Latin exonyms
- List of English exonyms
  - English exonyms for German toponyms
  - English-translated personal names
- List of German exonyms
  - German names for Central European towns
  - German exonyms for places in Belgium
  - German exonyms for places in Croatia
  - German exonyms for places in Denmark
  - German exonyms for places in Estonia
  - German exonyms for places in Hungary
  - German exonyms for places in Latvia
  - German exonyms for places in Slovakia
  - German exonyms for places in Switzerland
- List of European exonyms
  - Names of European cities in different languages
  - Finnish exonyms
  - Portuguese exonyms
  - Icelandic exonyms
  - Slavic toponyms for Greek places
  - Welsh names for other places in Britain and Ireland
- African/Asian/Middle-Eastern/Eurasian exonyms
  - Arabic exonyms
  - Chinese exonyms
  - Japanese exonyms
  - Vietnamese exonyms

== See also ==
- -onym
- Emic and etic
- Shibboleth
- Metonymy
- Linguistic imperialism

=== Other lists ===
- List of ethnic slurs
- List of countries and dependencies and their capitals in native languages
- List of adjectival and demonymic forms of place names
- List of language names
- List of alternative country names
- List of country names in various languages
- List of Latin place names in Europe
- List of European regions with alternative names
- List of European rivers with alternative names
- List of traditional Greek place names
- List of Coptic placenames
- Place names in Irish
- Names of places in Finland in Finnish and in Swedish
- List of renamed Indian cities and states
