= Icelandic exonyms =

Exonym nouns in Icelandic language

The following is a list of Icelandic exonyms, that is to say names for places in Icelandic that have been adapted to Icelandic spelling rules, translated into Icelandic, or Old Norse exonyms surviving in Icelandic. Commonly pronunciation is close to in English (or native), even though not stated below, but also commonly completely different, more common if names look very different or for European/Nordic places.

Language	Native name	Icelandic exonym
Albania Albanía
Albanian	Tiranë	Tirana
Afghanistan Afganistan
Persian – Pashto	Kābul – Kabəl	Kabúl
Algeria Alsír
Arabic	Al-Ŷazā'ir	Algeirsborg
Armenia Armenía
Armenian	Yerevan	Jerevan
Angola Angóla
Portuguese	Luanda	Lúanda
Argentina Argentína
Spanish	Tierra del Fuego	Eldland
Austria Austurríki
German	Wien	Vín or Vínarborg
Australia Ástralía
English	New South Wales	Nýja Suður-Wales
English	South Australia	Suður-Ástralía
English	Western Australia	Vestur-Ástralía
English	Australian Capital Territory	Höfuðborgarsvæði Ástralíu
English	Northern Territory	Norður-svæðið
English	Christmas Island	Jólaeyja
English	Cocos (Keeling) Islands	Kókoseyjar
English	Norfolk Island	Norfolkeyjar
English	Heard Island and McDonald Islands	Heard og McDonaldseyjar
Azerbaijan Aserbaídsjan
Azerbaijani	Bakı	Bakú
The Bahamas Bahamaeyjar
English	Nassau	Nassá
Belarus Hvíta-Rússland
Belarusian	Polotsk	Palteskja (historical), Hvíta-Rússland (historical), Belarús (current)
Belize Belís
English	Belmopan	Belmópan
Bhutan Bútan
Dzongkha	Thimphu	Timfú
Bolivia Bólivía
Spanish – Quechua	Sucre – Chuqichaka	Súkre
Bosnia Bosnía
Bosnian	Sarajevo	Sarajevó
Botswana Botsvana
English – Tswana	Gaborone	Gaboróne
Brazil Brasilía
Portuguese	Brasília	Brasilía
Burma Mjanmar
Burmese	Yangon	Jangún
Burundi Búrúndí
French	Bujumbura	Bújúmbúra
Cameroon Kamerún
French – English	Douala	Dóúala
French – English	Yaoundé	Jánde
Canada Kanada
English – French	Toronto	Torontó
Central African Republic Mið-Afríkulýðveldið
French	Bangui	Bangví
Chile Síle
Spanish	Rapa Nui	Páskaeyja
Spanish	Santiago	Santíagó
China Kína
Mandarin (pinyin Romanization)	Beijing	Peking (sometimes written and read Beijing; Peking reads a bit differently)
Mandarin (pinyin Romanization)	Shanghai	Sjanghæ (reads like in English)
Mandarin (pinyin Romanization)	Tianjin	Tientsin
Mandarin (pinyin Romanization)	Qingdao	Tsingtao
Mandarin (pinyin Romanization)	Nanjing	Nanking
Mandarin (pinyin Romanization)	Xiamen	Amoy
Mandarin (pinyin Romanization)	Guilin	Kweilin
Mandarin (pinyin Romanization)	Guangzhou	Kanton
Macau Makaó
Portuguese – Cantonese	Macau	Makaó
Taiwan Formósa
Mandarin (pinyin Romanization)	Táiběi	Taípei, Tæpei
Colombia Kólumbía
Spanish	Bogotá	Bógóta
Cook Islands Cookseyjar
Māori – English	Avarua	Avarúa
Cyprus Kýpur
Greek – Turkish	Lefkosía – Lefkoşa	Nikósía
Czech Republic Tékkland
Czech	Plzeň	Pilsen
Czech	Praha	Prag
Denmark Danmörk
Danish	Aalborg	Álaborg
Danish	Aarhus	Árósar
Danish	Helsingør	Helsingjaeyri
Danish	Falster	Falstur
Danish	Fredrikshavn	Friðrikshöfn
Danish	Fyn	Fjón
Danish	Humlebæk	Humlabekk (little used)
Danish	Jelling	Jalangur
Danish	Jylland	Jótland
Danish	København (Copenhagen)	Kaupmannahöfn
Danish	Lolland	Láland
Danish	Læsø	Hlésey
Danish	Odense	Óðinsvé
Danish	Ribe	Rípar
Danish	Ringsted	Hringstað
Danish	Roskilde	Hróarskelda
Danish	Silkeborg	Silkiborg
Danish	Sjælland	Sjáland
Danish	Skagen	Skaginn
Danish	Slagelse	Slagleysa
Danish	Sorø	Sórey
Danish	Viborg	Vébjörg
Dominican Republic Dóminíska Lýðveldið
Spanish	Santo Domingo	Santó Dómingó
Egypt Egyptaland
Arabic	Al-Iskandariyya	Alexandría
Arabic	Qāhirah	Kaíró
Arabic	Suways	Súes
Equatorial Guinea Miðbaugs-Gínea
French – Spanish	Malabo	Malabó
Ethiopia Eþíópía
Amharic	Adis Abäba	Addis Ababa
Faroe Islands Færeyjar
Faroese	Borðoy	Borðey
Faroese	Eysturoy	Austurey
Faroese	Fuglafjørður	Fuglafjörður
Faroese	Fugloy	Fugley
Faroese	Gásadalur	Gæsadalur
Faroese	Kalsoy	Karlsey
Faroese	Kirkjubøur	Kirkjubær
Faroese	Klaksvík	Klakksvík
Faroese	Kollafjørður	Kollafjörður
Faroese	Kunoy	Konuey
Faroese	Miðvágur	Miðvogur
Faroese	Nólsoy	Nólsey
Faroese	Sandavágur	Sandavogur
Faroese	Sandoy	Sandey
Faroese	Streymoy	Straumey
Faroese	Suðuroy	Suðurey
Faroese	Svínoy	Svíney
Faroese	Toftir	Tóftir
Faroese	Tórshavn	Þórshöfn
Faroese	Tvøroyri	Þvereyri
Faroese	Vágar	Vogar, Vogey
Faroese	Vágur	Vogur
Faroese	Viðoy	Viðey
Finland Finnland
Finnish – Swedish	Turku – Åbo	Árbæ
France Frakkland
French	Bretagne	Bretanía (current), Bretonskagi, Litla-Bretland, Bertangaland (obsolete), Bretland (obsolete)
French	Bourgogne	Búrgund
French	Corse	Korsíka
French	Nantes	Namsborg (obsolete)
French	Normandy	Norðmandí (obsolete), Normandí (current)
French	Paris	París
French	Poitiers	Peituborg
French	Reims	Reimsborg
French	Rouen	Rúðuborg
French	Strasbourg	Strassborg
French	Versailles	Versalir
French Polynesia Franska Pólýnesía
Tahitian – French	'Enana mā	Markesaseyjar
Tahitian – French	Tōtaiete mā	Félagseyjar
Tahitian – French	Tahiti	Tahítí
Tahitian – French	Tūāmotu mā	Lágeyjar (obsolete)
Ghana Gana
English	Accra	Akkra
Georgia Georgía
Georgian	Tbi'lisi	Tíblisi (Tíflis in common parlance)
Germany Þýskaland
German	Berlin	Berlín
German	Bavaria	Bæjaraland
German	Braunschweig	Brúnsvík (obsolete)
German	Bremen	Brimar
German	Flensburg	Flensborg
German	Frankfurt	Frakkafurða (little used)
German	Hamburg	Hamborg
German	Haddeby	Heiðabær
German	Holstein	Holtsetaland
German	Kiel	Kíl
German	Köln (Cologne)	Kolni (little used), Köln (current)
German	Lübeck	Lýbika
German	Oldenburg	Aldinborg
German	Rostock	Rauðstokkur (obsolete)
German	Schleswig	Slésvík
German	Stralsund	Stræla
German	Stuttgart	Stóðgarður (little used)
German	Verden	Ferðuborg (obsolete)
Greece Grikkland
Greek	Athína	Aþena
Greek	Límnos	Lemney
Greek	Thessaloníki	Saloníka (obsolete), Þessalónika (current)
Guinea Gínea
French	Conakry	Kónakrí
Guatemala Gvatemala
Spanish	Ciudad de Guatemala	Gvatemalaborg
Guinea-Bissau Gínea-Bissá
Portuguese	Bissau	Bissá (reads like in English)
Hungary Ungverjaland
Hungarian	Budapest	Búdapest
India Indland
Hindi – English	Kolkata	Kalkútta (obsolete)
Hindi – English	Naī Dillī – New Delhi	Nýja-Delí
Indonesia Indónesía
Indonesian	DKI Jakarta	Djakarta
Iran Íran
Persian	Tehrān	Teheran
Iraq Írak
Arabic – Kurdish	Baġdād – Bexda	Bagdað (or which reads almost the same)
Ireland Írland
Irish	Áth Cliath/Dubhlinn (Dublin)	Dyflinn(i)
Irish	Luimneach (Limerick)	Hlymrek (obsolete)
Israel Ísrael
Hebrew – Arabic	Yerushaláyim – al Quds	Jórsalaborg (obsolete), Jerúsalem (current)
Hebrew – Arabic	Ḥeifa – Ḥayfā	Haífa
Hebrew – Arabic	Tel Aviv-Yafo – Tal ʼAbīb	Tel Avív
Italy Ítalía
Italian	Bari	Bár (obsolete)
Italian	Firenze	Flórens
Italian	Genova	Genúa
Italian	Lucca	Lukkuborg (obsolete)
Italian	Milano	Meilansborg (obsolete), Mílanó (current)
Italian	Napoli	Napólí
Italian	Roma	Róm, Rómaborg (both are commonly and, additionally Rómarborg, which is an incorrect spelling, with extra r before the ending -borg, which means city).
Italian	Salerno	Salernisborg (rare)
Italian	Torino	Tórínó
Italian	Venezia	Feneyjar
Japan Japan
Japanese	Kyōto-shi	Kýótó
Japanese	Tōkyō	Tókýó
Kenya Kenýa
English – Swahili	Nairobi	Naíróbí
Latvia Lettland
Latvian	Rīga	Ríga
Latvian	Kurzeme	Kúrland
Latvian	Daugava	Dvína
Latvian	Livonija	Lífland
Latvian	Liepāja	Líbá
Lebanon Líbanon
Arabic – French	Bayrūt – Beyrouth	Beirút
Liberia Líbería
English	Monrovia	Monróvía
Libya Líbýa
Arabic	Ṭarābulus	Trípólí
Lithuania Litháen
Lithuanian	Vilnius	Vilníus
Madagascar Madagaskar
Malagasy – French	Antananarivo	Antananarívó
Malawi Malaví
English	Lilongwe	Lílongve
Malaysia Malasía
Malay	Kuala Lumpur	Kúala Lúmpúr
Mali Malí
French – Bambara	Bamako – Bamakə	Bamakó
French – Bambara	Tombouctou – Timbuktu	Timbúktú
Marshall Islands Marshalleyjar
Marshallese – English	Majuro	Majúró
Mauritania Máritanía
Arabic – French	Nouakchott	Núaksjott
Mexico Mexíkó
Spanish	Ciudad de México	Mexíkóborg
Moldova Moldóva
Romanian	Chișinău	Kisínev
Mongolia Mongólía
Mongolian	Ulaanbaatar	Úlaan Bator
Montenegro Svartfjallaland
Mozambique Mósambík
Portuguese	Maputo	Mapútó
North Korea Norður-Kórea
Korean	P'yŏngyang	Pjongjang
Nepal Nepal
Nepali	Kāţhmāņđau	Katmandú
The Netherlands Holland
Dutch	Amsterdam	Amsturdammur (little used), Erilstífla (little used)
Dutch	Den Haag or ´s Gravenhage	Haag
Dutch	Utrecht	Trekt (little used)
Dutch	Zuiderzee	Suðursjó (historical)
Nicaragua Níkaragva
Spanish	Managua	Managva
Niger Níger
French	Niamey	Níamey
Nigeria Nígería
English – Yorùbá	Abuja-Abùjá	Abútja
Norway Noregur
Norwegian
Norwegian	Akershus	Akurshús
Norwegian	Arendal	Arnardalur
Norwegian	Aust-Agder	Austur-Agðir
Norwegian	Bergen	Björgyn (obsolete), Björgvin (current)
Norwegian	Bjørnøya	Bjarnarey
Norwegian	Bodø	Boðvin
Norwegian	Bærum	Bergheimur (obsolete)
Norwegian	Drammen	Dröfn (obsolete)
Norwegian	Finnmark	Finnmörk
Norwegian	Gjøvik	Djúpvík (historical)
Norwegian	Hedmark	Heiðmörk
Norwegian	Hordaland	Hörðaland
Norwegian	Karmøy	Körmt (historical)
Norwegian	Møre og Romsdal	Mæri og Raumsdalur
Norwegian	Nord-Trøndelag, Sør-Trøndelag	Norður-Þrændalög, Suður-Þrændalög
Norwegian	Nordland	Norðurland
Norwegian	Oslo	Kauphágur (historical), Ósló (current)
Norwegian	Rogaland	Rygjafylki
Norwegian	Skien	Skiða (obsolete)
Norwegian	Sogn og Fjordane	Sogn og Firðafylki
Norwegian	Stavanger	Stafangur
Norwegian	Telemark	Þelamörk
Norwegian	Trondheim	Niðarós (historical), Þrándheimur (current)
Norwegian	Tønsberg	Túnsberg (obsolete)
Norwegian	Østfold	Austfold
Norwegian	Ålesund	Álasund
Oman Óman
Arabic	Masqaṭ	Múskat
Paraguay Paragvæ
Spanish – Guaraní	Asunción	Asúnsjón
Peru Perú
Spanish	Lima	Líma
Philippines Filippseyjar
Tagalog – Cebuano	Maynila – Manila	Maníla
Poland Pólland
Polish	Cities	
Polish	Wrocław	Breslá
Polish	Kraków	Kraká
Polish	Warszawa	Varsjá
Polish	Szczecin	Stettín
Polish	Voivodeships	
Polish	Silesia	Slesía
Polish	Kuyavia	Kujavía
Polish	Pomerania	Pommern
Polish	Małopolska	Litla-Pólland
Polish	Warmia	Ermland
Polish	Masuria	Masúría
Polish	Mazovia	Masóvía
Polish	Subcarpathia	Neðri-Karpatía
Portugal Portúgal
Portuguese	Lisboa	Lissabon
Romania Rúmenía
Romanian	București	Búkarest
Romanian	Constanța	Konstantía
Russia Rússland
Russian	Murom	Móramar (historical)
Russian	Novgorod	Hólmgarður, Nýi Garður, Nýborg
Russian	Rostov	Ráðstofa
Russian	Sankt Peterburg	Sankti Pétursborg
Russian	Smolensk	Smáleskja (historical)
Russian	Staraya Ladoga	Aldeigjuborg (historical)
Russian	Suzdal	Súrsdalar (historical)
Rwanda Rúanda
Kinyarwanda – French	Kigali	Kígalí
Samoa Samóa
Samoan	Apia	Apía
Saudi Arabia Sádí-Arabía
Arabic	Makkah	Mekka
Arabic	Riyāḍ	Ríad
Serbia Serbía
Serbian	Beograd	Belgrad
Somalia Sómalía
Somali – Arabic	Muqdisho – Maqadīshū	Mógadisjú
South Africa Suður-Afríka
English – Afrikaans	Cape of Good Hope	Góðrarvonarhöfði
English – Afrikaans	Cape Town – Kaapstad	Höfðaborg
English – Afrikaans	Johannesburg	Jóhannesarborg
English – Afrikaans	Pretoria	Pretoría
South Korea Suður-Kórea
Korean	Seoul	Seúl
Spain Spánn
Spanish	Barcelona	Barselóna
Sri Lanka Srí Lanka
Sinhala – Tamil	Sri Jayawardenapura-Kotte	Srí Jajevardenepúra
Sudan Súdan
Arabic – English	Kharṭūm – Khartoum	Kartúm
Suriname Súrínam
Dutch	Paramaribo	Paramaríbó
Sweden Svíþjóð
Swedish	Göteborg	Gautaborg
Swedish	Helsingborg	Helsingjaborg
Swedish	Lund	Lundur
Swedish	Malmö	Málmhaugar (little used), Málmey
Swedish	Stockholm	Stokkhólmur
Swedish	Uppsala	Uppsalir
Switzerland Sviss
German – French	Basel – Bâle	Boslaraborg (obsolete)
Syria Sýrland
Arabic	Dimašq	Damaskus
Tajikistan Tadsjikistan
Tajik	Dushanbe	Dúshanbe
Tanzania Tansanía
Swahili	Dodoma	Dódóma
Thailand Taíland
Thai	Krung Thep	Bangkok
Tonga Tonga
Tongan – English	Nukuʻalofa	Núkúalófa
Turkey Tyrkland
Turkish	İstanbul	Mikligarður (historical), Istanbúl (current)
Ukraine Úkraína
Ukrainian	Kyiv	Kænugarður, Kyjív
United Arab Emirates Sameinuðu arabísku furstadæmin
Arabic	Abū Zabī	Abú Dabí
Arabic	'Ajmān	Adsman
Arabic	Dubayy	Dúbaí
United Kingdom Bretland
English	Aberdeen	Apardjón (obsolete)
English	Canterbury	Kantaraborg
English	Dover	Dofrar (little used)
English	Edinburgh	Edinborg
English	Yarmouth	Járnamóða (little used)
English	Cambridge	Kambabryggja (little used)
English	Lerwick	Leirvík
English	London	Lundúnir (also used, but London more current)
English	Southampton	Suðurhamtún (little used)
English	Oxford	Öxnafurða (little used)
English	Scarborough	Skarðaborg (obsolete)
English	York	Jórvík
English	Wales	Valland (little used)
English	Isle of Man	Mön
United States Bandaríkin
English	California	Kalifornía
English	Florida	Flórída
English	Georgia	Georgía
English	New York	Nýja-Jórvík (not in common use, a jocular term of academic pretension)
English	North Carolina	Norður-Karólína
English	North Dakota	Norður-Dakóta
English	Pennsylvania	Pennsylvanía
English	South Carolina	Suður-Karólína
English	South Dakota	Suður-Dakóta
English	Virginia	Virginía
English	West Virginia	Vestur-Virginía
Uruguay Úrúgvæ
Spanish	Montevideo	Montevídeó
Uzbekistan Úsbekistan
Uzbek	Toshkent	Taskent
Vatican City Vatíkanið, Páfagarður, or Vatíkanborg
Latin	Status Civitatis Vaticanae	Páfagarður
Venezuela Venesúela
Spanish	Caracas	Karakas
Vietnam Víetnam
Vietnamese	Hà Nội	Hanoí
Vietnamese	Thành phố Hồ Chí Minh	Ho Chi Minh-borg, formerly Saígon
Zambia Sambía
English	Lusaka	Lúsaka
Language	Native name	Icelandic exonym

== See also ==
- List of European exonyms
- Old Norse exonyms
