= Hondelange =

Hondelange Hondeleng (Luxembourgish)
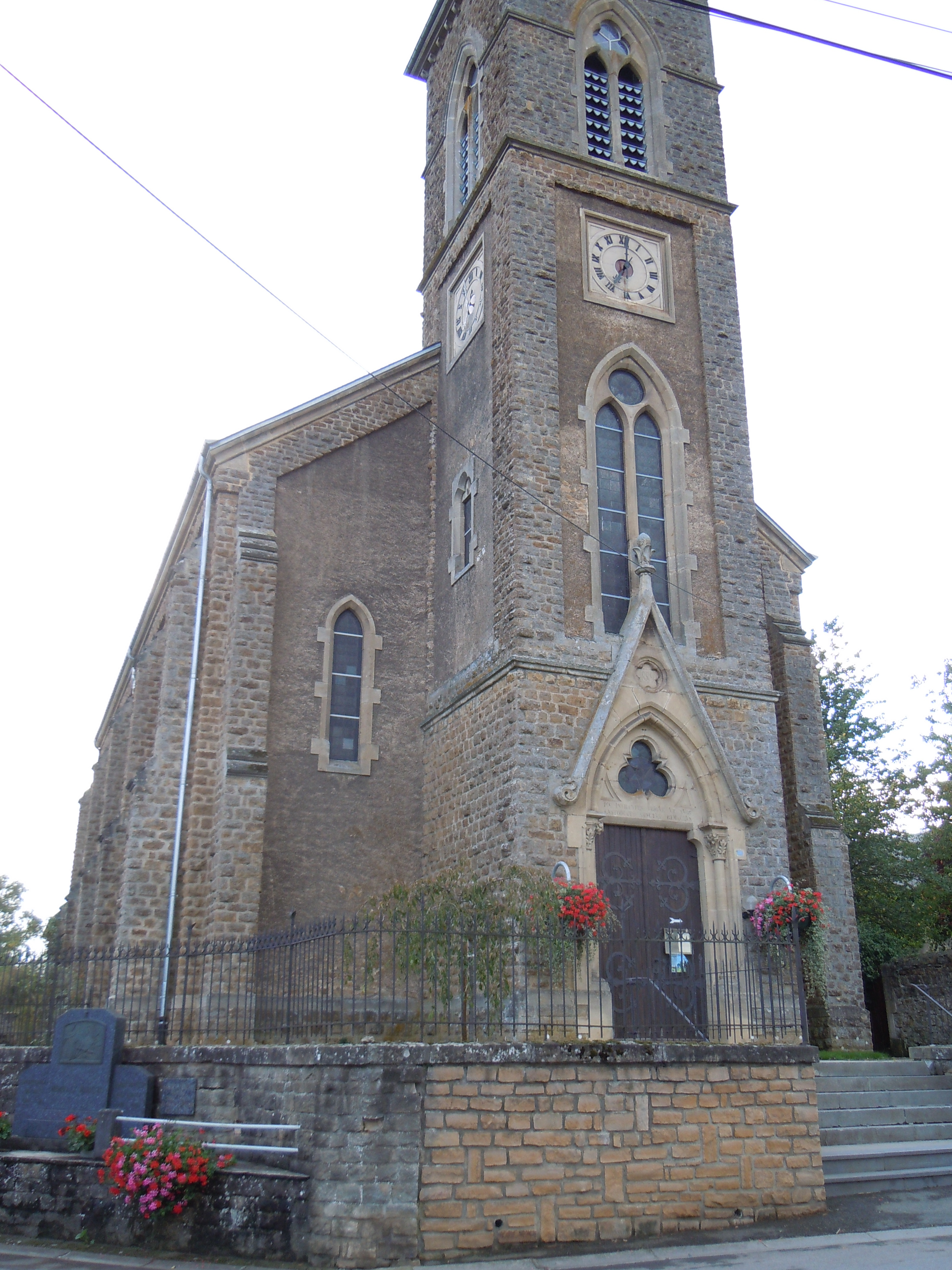
- Hondelange, village church

- Coat of arms

- Location within Belgium Location within Europe
- Coordinates: 49°34′29″N 05°28′56″E
- Country: Belgium
- Region: Wallonia
- Province: Luxembourg
- Municipality: Messancy

Hondelange (French pronunciation: [ɔ̃dlɑ̃ʒ]; Luxembourgish: Hondeleng; German: Hondelingen; Walloon: Hondlindje) is a village of Wallonia and a district of the municipality of Messancy, located in the province of Luxembourg, Belgium.

The area has been settled since Roman times. The village church is mentioned for the first time in 1130 in a document from the Abbey of Stavelot, though the present church building dates from 1891. A castle has existed in the village, but the last remains of it were demolished in 1930. There is a group of calvary crosses in the village, the oldest of which is from 1717.
