= Virton railway station =

Railway station in Luxembourg, Belgium

Virton
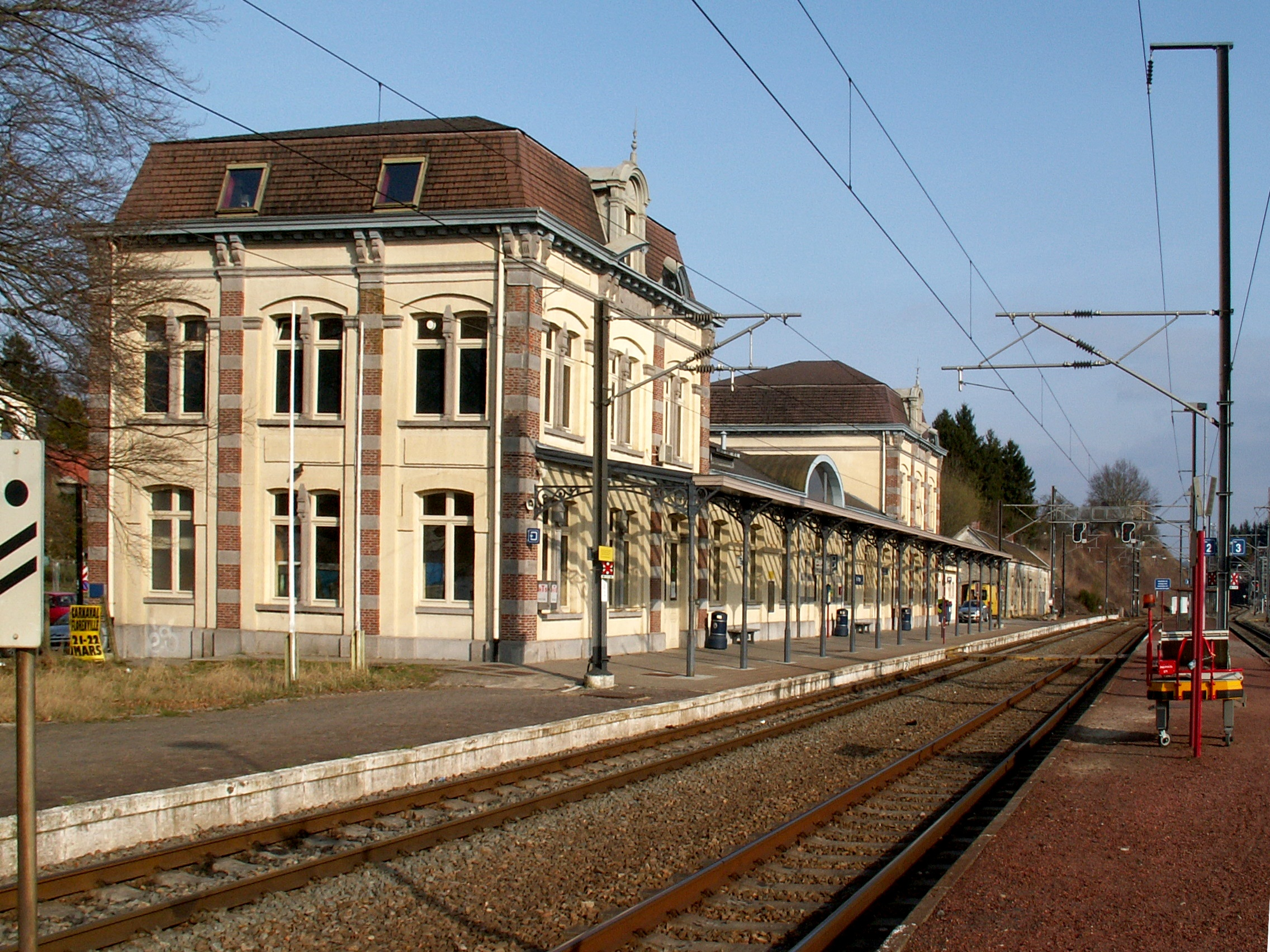
- Virton railway station

General information
- Location: Avenue Bouvier; 6762 Virton; Belgium
- Coordinates: 49.560464°N 5.519355°E
- System: Railway Station
- Owner: SNCB/NMBS
- Operator: SNCB/NMBS

Other information
- Website: Official website
Location

Virton railway station (French: Gare de Virton; Dutch: Station Virton) (Note: Officially Virton) is a railway station in Virton, Luxembourg, Belgium. It is located on railway line 165, from Athus to Libramont. It was commissioned in 1879 by the Society of Railway Virton, and was formerly called Virton-Saint-Mard railway station (French: Gare de Virton-Saint-Mard; Dutch: Station Virton-Saint-Mard) (Note: Officially Virton-Saint-Mard). It is operated by the National Railway Company of Belgium (SNCB/NMBS) and served by the following types of trains: Omnibus (L) and Rush Hour trains (P).

== Railway station ==
At an altitude of 204 metres (669 ft), the station is located in Virton, kilometer marker (PK) 24.70 on Infrabel line 165 from Athus to Libramont between Halanzy and Florenville stations. A hub station, it was the origin of the Invrabel line 155, from Marbehan to Virton and the French border, which is partially closed and decommissioned and which only retains the connection to the Burgo factory. The old railway station of Virton-Ville was on this line.

== History ==
In 1984, after the closure of steel plants of Athus and Longwy the passenger traffic between the stations of Virton and Athus was terminated.

The station's restoration and modernisation, at a cost of €170,000, was finished in September 2006. The main renovations are to the passenger building, the marquee located on platform 1, and the parking. On 11 December 2006, the passenger service between Virton and Athus was renewed and to the city of Luxembourg.

== Train services ==
The station is served by the following services:

- Local services (L-13) Libramont - Virton - Athus - Arlon (weekdays)
- Local services (L-13) Libramont - Virton (weekends)

Preceding station	NMBS/SNCB	Following station
Florenville towards Libramont	L 13 weekdays, except holidays	Halanzy towards Arlon
Florenville towards Libramont	L 13 weekends	Terminus

== Travellers' services ==
=== Hospitality ===
A SNCB station, Virton station offers travelers a ticket office, open daily. Handicap facilities, equipment and services are available.

=== Serving ===
Virton is served by trains, omnibuses (L) and Heure de pointe (Rush Hour) (P) of the SNCB undertaking service on line 165.

=== Transportation connections ===
Parking for vehicles is available, as well as a bus service.

== See also ==
- List of railway stations in Belgium
- Rail transport in Belgium
