= Longeau, Belgium =

Longeau
- Village
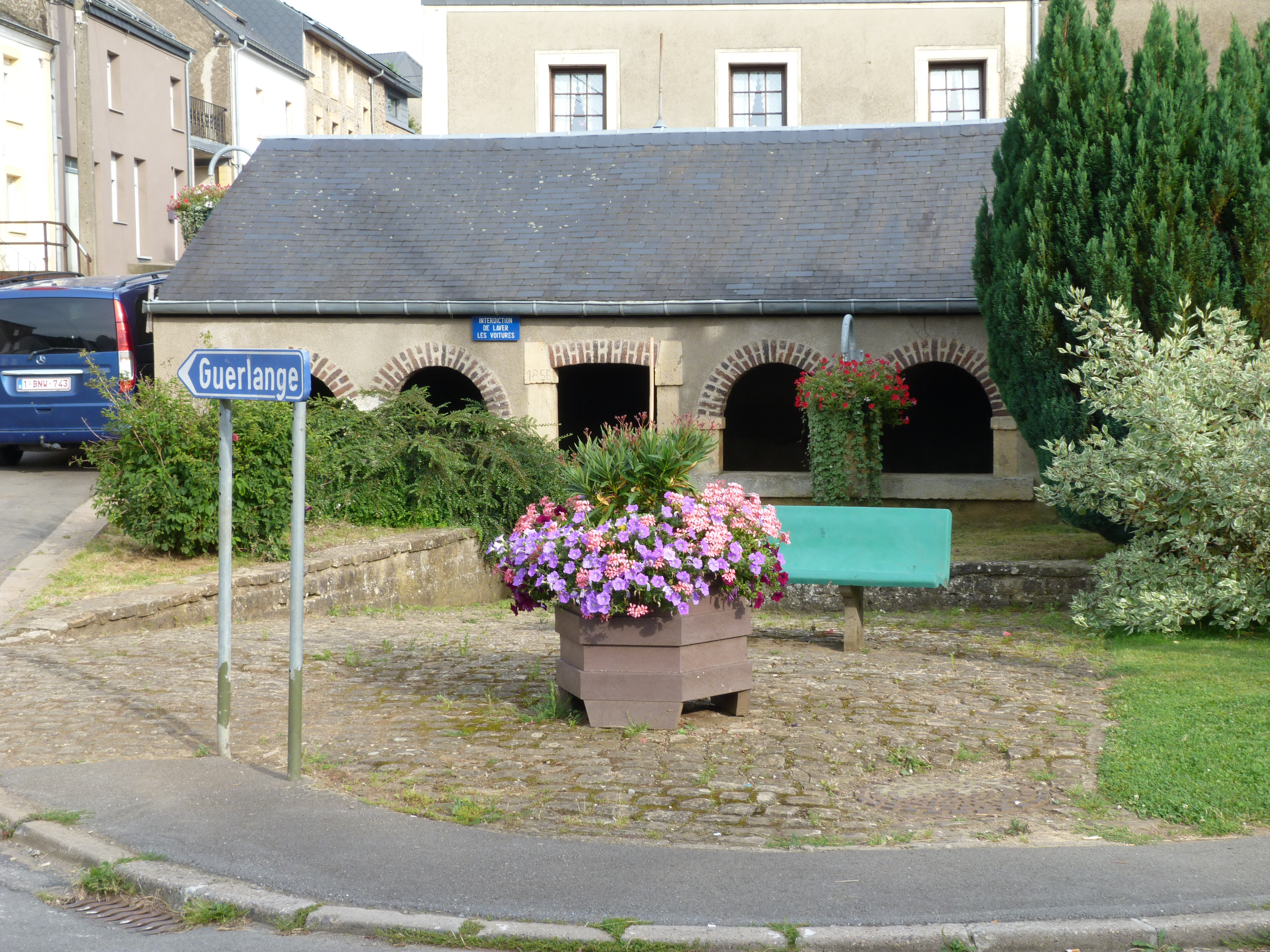

- Location in Belgium
- Coordinates: 49°34′43″N 05°50′00″E

Population
  - Total: 673
- Time zone: UTC+1
- Postal code: 6780

Longeau (French pronunciation: [lɔ̃ʒo]; Luxembourgish: Laser) is a village of Wallonia in the municipality and district of Messancy, located in the province of Luxembourg, Belgium.

== Famous people related ==
- Brian Molko, singer and cofounder of the rock band Placebo, spent a big part of his youth in Longeau.
