= Sélange =

Coordinates: 49°36.6′N 5°51′E

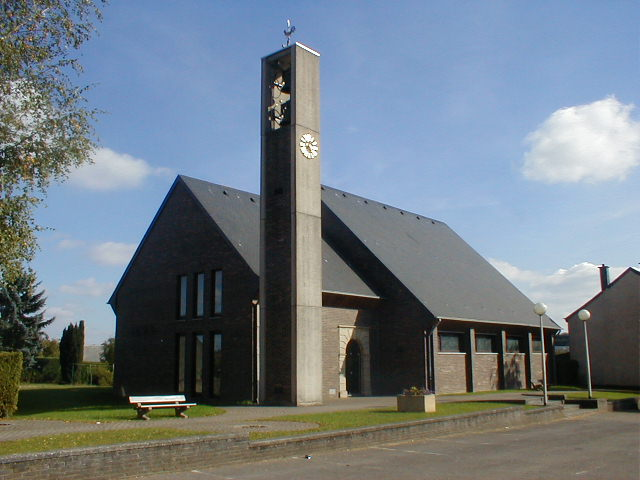
The church

Sélange (French pronunciation: [selɑ̃ʒ]; Luxembourgish: Séilen; German: Selingen; Walloon: Sélindje) is a village in Wallonia and a district of the municipality of Messancy, located in the province of Luxembourg, Belgium. Nearby is the source of the River Eisch.

== Population ==
In 1978, 697 residents were recorded. In 1990, 729 residents were recorded and on 1 June 2006, 793 residents were recorded.
