= Chinese exonyms =

Translating a non-Chinese toponym into a Chinese exonym is a complex task, given the high number of homophones in Chinese, the existence of multiple conventions for translation, and differences in the phonetic systems between the source language and Chinese.

Generally, Chinese exonyms fall into three categories:

- Phonetic transcriptions, for similarity of sound without regard for the meaning of the Chinese characters. For example, London is translated to 伦敦 (Lúndūn), but the individual characters 伦 (lún, order) and 敦 (dūn, kindhearted) are only used for their sounds, not their meanings.
- Literal translations, where the underlying meaning of the name is directly translated into Chinese characters. For example, Salt Lake City is translated to 盐湖城 (Yánhú Chéng), with the individual characters being 盐 (yán, salt), 湖 (hú, lake), and 城 (chéng, city). This is also the case with Iceland, which is translated to 冰岛 (Bīngdǎo), with the individual characters being 冰 (bīng, ice) and 岛 (dǎo, island). A little different case is Montenegro, which is translated to 黑山 (Hēishān), with the individual characters being 黑 (hēi, negro, black) and 山 (shān, monte, mountain).
- For certain countries who use, or historically used, Chinese characters, the Chinese exonyms is simply the Chinese reading of the characters of that place's native name, which may be substantially different from the native readings of those characters. For instance, Tokyo is written as 東京 in Kanji and pronounced Tōkyō, but in Mandarin Chinese this is pronounced Dōngjīng. The meanings of the characters 東 (eastern) and 京 (capital) are preserved after the translation.

There are other exonyms that are a combination of translation and transcription (meaning and sound) of the endonym. For example, Hamburg is written as 汉堡 (Hànbǎo), in which the second character 堡 (bǎo, fort, castle), is a translation of the German "burg", (fortress, castle); and the first character 汉 (Hàn) is a transcription of "Ham".

Names of foreign nations are sometimes shortened to their first character when used in compounds. For example, the name for Russia in Chinese is 俄罗斯 (Éluósī), but the name of the Russian language is 俄语 (Éyǔ), anything Russian-style is 俄式 (Éshì), and the Russian military is 俄军 (Éjūn).

== History ==
Historically, neighboring states and peoples of China were often given exonyms or descriptions that were pejorative in nature. For instance, the first exonym for Japan from the Han dynasty (206 BCE – 24 CE) was the Chinese Wo or Japanese Wa 倭 meaning "submissive; dwarf barbarian"; this was replaced by the endonym 日本 (rìběn) by the 8th century.

Many other historical exonyms took centuries to settle into common acceptance. In his A Short Account of the Maritime Circuit, Geographer Xu Jiyu (1795–1873) commented that when translating a foreign place name into Chinese "ten people will have ten different translations, and one person's translation will vary." This was due to, among other problems, the high number of homophones in Chinese.

Early Chinese exonyms for the Netherlands in the 17th century included 红毛番 (Hóngmáofān, Red-haired foreigners), and 红夷 (Hóngyí, Red Easterners or Red barbarians), before it was changed in 1794 to the modern phonetic transcription 荷兰 (Hélán, lit. "lotus orchid") by the Qianlong Emperor via imperial decree.

Some Chinese exonyms which are not obviously translations or transcriptions exist due to historical significance to Chinese speakers. For example, the names 旧金山 (Jiùjīnshān, lit. "Old Gold Mountain") and 新金山 (Xīnjīnshān, lit. "New Gold Mountain") for San Francisco and Melbourne were given by Chinese migrants in the Californian and Victorian gold rushes in the 19th century.

Countries had been founded or had gained independence after 1949 (the year Kuomintang had exiled to Taiwan after losing to the Communist Party) often have different exonyms used in mainland China (PRC) and Taiwan (ROC) due to differences in official standards resulting from the split in government. For example, the mainland Chinese exonym for Vientiane is 万象 (Wànxiàng), while the Taiwanese exonym is 永珍 (Yǒngzhēn).

== List of notable exonyms ==
The exonyms below are all in Mandarin Chinese. Exonyms used in mainland China are written in simplified Chinese on this page, and exonyms used in Taiwan are written in traditional Chinese, both if both. The exception to this are exonyms for Japanese and Korean place names, which are written in traditional Chinese.

| English name | Mandarin name | | | Endonym (non-Latin) | Notes |
| English name | Name | Type | Literal meaning | Endonym (non-Latin) | Notes |
|---|---|---|---|---|---|
| Melbourne | Mò'ěrběn (墨尔本) | Transcription | | | The nickname "New Gold Mountain" was the nickname for the city given by Chinese immigrants and migrant workers looking for gold during the Australian gold rushes. |
| Melbourne | Xīnjīnshān (新金山) | Special history | New Gold Mountain | | The nickname "New Gold Mountain" was the nickname for the city given by Chinese immigrants and migrant workers looking for gold during the Australian gold rushes. |
| São Paulo | Shèngbǎoluó (圣保罗) | Translation-transcription mix | | | Shèng (圣) is used for place names that contain the word "Saint" or cognates in other languages as a phono-semantic matching. |
| Porto Alegre | Āléigélǐgǎng (阿雷格里港) | Translation-transcription mix | | | "Āléigélǐ" (阿雷格里) is a transcription of the Portuguese word "Alegre". "Gǎng" (港) means "harbor" in Mandarin. |
| Porto Alegre | Yúgǎng (愉港) | Translation | | | "Happy Harbor" in Mandarin. |
| Bali | Bālí dǎo (巴厘岛) | Translation-transcription mix | | | Used in mainland China, homonymous with Paris (巴黎 Bālí). |
| Bali | Bālǐ (峇里) | Transcription | | | Used in Taiwan, Singapore, and Malaysia. |
| San Francisco | Jiùjīnshān (旧金山) | Special history | Old Gold Mountain | | Early Chinese immigrants named the city "Gold Mountain" after the California Gold Rush. However, when another gold mine was discovered in Melbourne, Australia, San Francisco was retronymically added "Old". Name used by both governments of Republic of China and People's Republic of China. |
| San Francisco | Sānfānshì (三藩市) | Translation-transcription mix | City of three aliens | | Sometimes shown side by side with Jiujinshan, in parentheses. Official name used by the government of Hong Kong and more common in Cantonese. |
| San Francisco | Dàbù (大埠) | Special history | Big port | | Used by the first generations of Chinese immigrants, but rarely today. |
| Phnom Penh | Jīntǎ (金塔) | Special history | Golden tower | Khmer: ភ្នំពេញ, romanized: Phnum Pénh, lit. 'Penh's Hill/Mountain' | Referring to the pagoda of Wat Phnom. |
| Phnom Penh | Jīnbiān (金邊/金边) | Special history-transcription mix | Golden edge | Khmer: ភ្នំពេញ, romanized: Phnum Pénh, lit. 'Penh's Hill/Mountain' | Referring to the pagoda of Wat Phnom. |
| Ho Chi Minh City | Hú Zhìmíng Shì (胡志明市) | Translation-transcription mix | Ho Chi Minh City | Vietnamese: 城庯胡志明, romanized: Thành phó Hồ Chí Minh | Hú Zhìmíng (胡志明) is the Chinese pronunciation of the Chinese characters that make up the name Ho Chi Minh. |
| Ho Chi Minh City | Xīgòng (西貢) | Transcription | Saigon | Vietnamese: 柴棍, romanized: Sài Gòn | The native Vietnamese name in Chữ Nôm is 柴棍 (Cháigùn). |
| Huế | Shùnhuà (順化) | Translation | Transform | Vietnamese: 化, romanized: Huế | Shùnhuà (順化) is based on the old name Thuận Hóa (順化). |
| Bangkok | Màngǔ (曼谷) | Transcription | | Thai: กรุงเทพ, romanized: Krungthep, lit. 'City of Gods' | Transcription through the Teochew dialect; where 曼谷 is pronounced as "bhuêng2 gog4". |
| Chiang Mai | Qīngmài (清迈) | Transcription | | Thai: เชียงใหม่, romanized: Chiangmai | Transcription through the Teochew dialect, where 清迈 is pronounced as "cêng1 mai6". |
| Vladivostok | Hǎishēnwǎi (海參崴) | Native name | Curve of the sea cucumber | Russian: Владивосток, romanized: Vladivostok, lit. 'Conquer the East' | 海參崴 is the native Chinese name of Vladivostok (符拉迪沃斯托克, Fúlādíwòsītuōkè). |
