= Meix-le-Tige =

Coordinates: 49°37′N 5°43′E

Meix-le-Tige (Walloon: Méch-li-Tîxhe; Luxembourgish: Däisch-Mier/Däitsch-Meesch; German: Deutsch-Meer) is a village of Wallonia and a district of the municipality of Saint-Léger, located in the province of Luxembourg, Belgium. It was a separate municipality until the 1977 fusion of municipalities.

== Etymology ==
Meix-le-Tige is an exception in Belgian Lorraine, in that its name has a Germanic origin even though its inhabitants traditionally spoke the Romance Lorrain dialect called gaumais. The explanation comes from the first great plagues of the Middle Ages, when the Frankish population was wiped out. The village was then re-populated by the Romance-speaking Gaumais, who nevertheless kept the original Germanic name.
