= Minor campaigns of 1815 =

Non-Waterloo events of the War of the Seventh Coalition

- Part of the War of the Seventh Coalition
- The Campaign of France 1815
Date	18 June – 7 July 1815 (2 weeks and 5 days)
Location	France
Result	Defeat and occupation of France

Belligerents
France	Seventh Coalition: Austria; Russia; Sardinia; Switzerland; Liechtenstein; French royalists

Commanders and leaders
(First French Empire) Adolphe Édouard Casimir Joseph Mortier (Imperial Guard at Paris) (First French Empire) Jean Rapp (Armée du Rhin) (First French Empire) Suchet, Duc d'Albuféra (Armée des Alpes) (First French Empire) Claude Lecourbe (Armée du Jura) (First French Empire) Guillaume Brune (Armée du Var) (First French Empire) Charles Decaen and Bertrand, comte Clausel (Armies of the Pyrenees east and west) (First French Empire) Jean Lamarque (Armée de l'Ouest — Vendée and Loire)	Prince of Schwarzenberg (Upper Rhine); Duke of Casalanza (Upper Italy); Johann Frimont (Naples) (Russian Empire) Michael Andreas Barclay de Tolly (Russia) (Kingdom of Prussia) von Hake

On 1 March 1815, Napoleon Bonaparte escaped from his imprisonment on the isle of Elba and launched a bid to recover his empire. A confederation of European powers pledged to stop him. During the period known as the Hundred Days, Napoleon chose to confront the armies of Prince Blücher and the Duke of Wellington in what has become known as the Waterloo Campaign. He was decisively defeated by the two allied armies at the Battle of Waterloo; they subsequently marched on Paris, forcing Napoleon to abdicate for the second time. However, Russia, Austria, and some of the minor German states also fielded armies against him, and all of them invaded France. Of these other armies, those engaged in the largest campaigns and seeing the most fighting were two Austrian armies: the Army of the Upper Rhine and the Army of Italy.

The Battle of Waterloo, followed by the advance of Blücher and Wellington's armies upon Paris, was decisive. The primary objective of the war—the destruction of Napoleon's power and the restoration of the Bourbon dynasty under King Louis XVIII on 8 July 1815—was achieved while the Armies of the Upper Rhine and of Italy were just beginning their invasion of French territory. Had the efforts of Blücher and Wellington been less decisive, or had they suffered reverses, the operations of the armies advancing from the Rhine and across the Alps would have taken on immense importance. However, the rapid success in northern France reduced the interest in military operations elsewhere. The operations of the Coalition armies invading France's eastern and southeastern frontiers demonstrate that the decisive victory at Waterloo and the speedy capture of Paris averted a more general and protracted war on these frontiers. A different result in Belgium might have emboldened the French to mount a stronger defence in these regions.

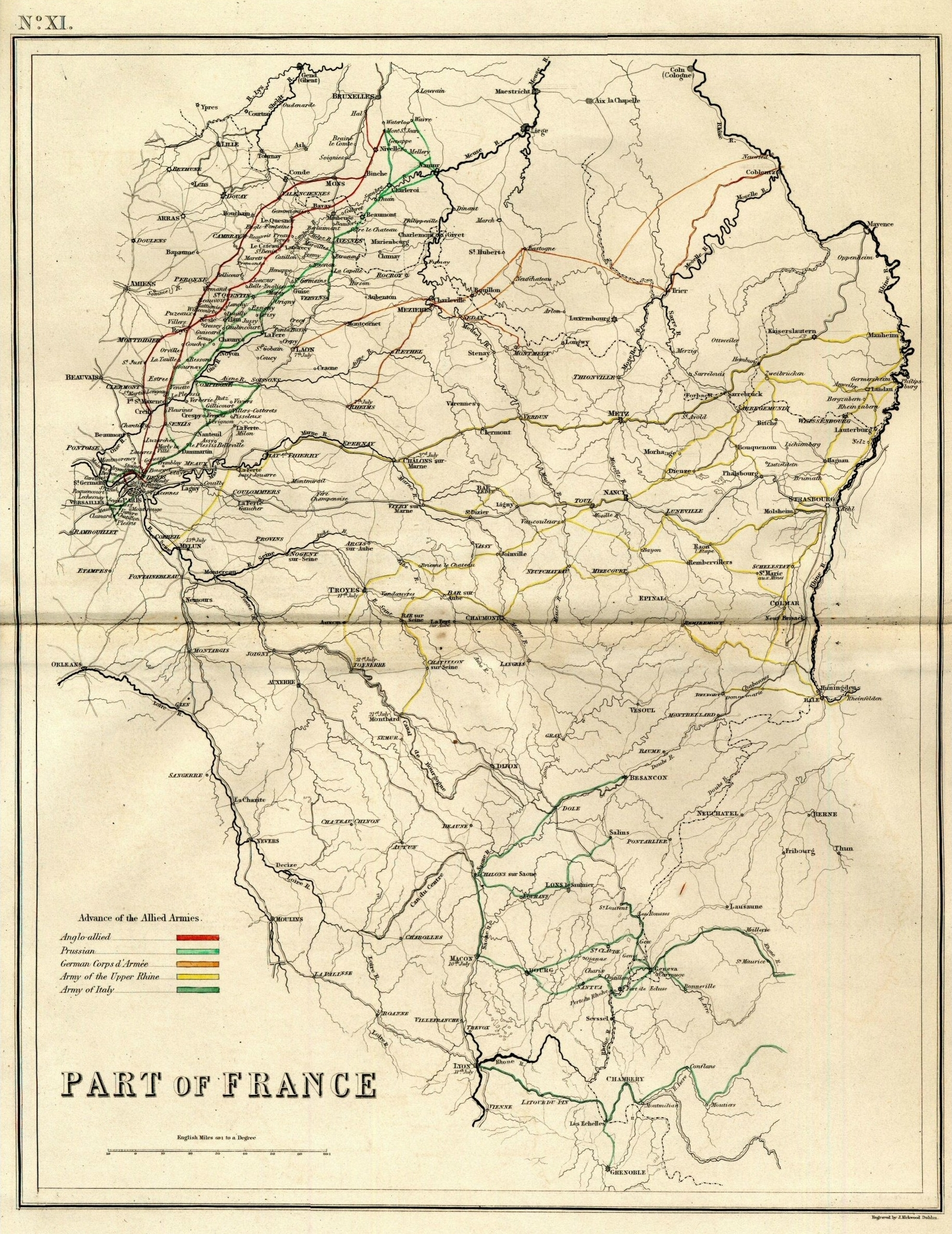
Part of France engraved by J. Kirkwood, showing the invasion routes of the Seventh Coalition armies in 1815. Red: Anglo-allied army; light green: Prussian army; orange: North German Federal Army; yellow: Army of the Upper Rhine; dark green: Army of Italy.

== French deployments ==
Upon assuming the throne, Napoleon found that the Bourbons had left him with little; the state of the Army was 56,000 troops, of whom 46,000 were ready to campaign. By the end of May, the total armed forces available to Napoleon had reached 198,000, with 66,000 more in depots training but not yet ready for deployment.

By the end of May, Napoleon had deployed his forces as follows:

- I Corps (Jean-Baptiste Drouet, Comte d'Erlon): cantoned between Lille and Valenciennes.
- II Corps (Honoré Charles Reille): cantoned between Valenciennes and Avesnes.
- III Corps (Dominique Joseph Vandamme): cantoned around Rocroi.
- IV Corps (Étienne Maurice Gérard ): cantoned at Metz.
- VI Corps (Georges Mouton, Count de Lobau): cantoned at Laon.
- Cavalry Reserve (Emmanuel, marquis de Grouchy): cantoned at Guise.
- Imperial Guard (Édouard Mortier, Duke of Trévise): at Paris.

The preceding corps were to be formed into L'Armée du Nord (the "Army of the North"); led by Napoleon, they would participate in the Waterloo Campaign. For the defence of France, Bonaparte deployed his remaining forces within the country to observe enemies, both foreign and domestic, intending to delay the former and suppress the latter. By June, they were organised as follows:

- V Corps – Armée du Rhin (Jean Rapp): cantoned near Strasbourg, with a strength of 46 guns and 20,000–23,000 men.

More troops guarded the southeast frontier from Basel to Nice and covered Lyon:

- VII Corps – Armée des Alpes (Louis Gabriel Suchet): based at Lyon, this army was charged with the defence of Lyon and to observe the Austro-Sardinian army of Frimont, with a strength of 42–46 guns and 13,000–23,500 men.
- I Corps of Observation – Armée du Jura (Claude Jacques Lecourbe): based at Belfort, this army was to observe any Austrian movement through Switzerland and also observe the Swiss army of General Bachmann. Its composition in June was 38 guns and 5,392–8,400 men.
- II Corps of Observation – Armée du Var (Guillaume Marie Anne Brune): based at Toulon, with a strength of 10,000 men.

There were two other major deployments:

- 8,000 men under Bertrand Clausel cantoned around Toulouse and under Charles Mathieu Isidore Decaen cantoned around Bordeaux guarding the Pyrenean frontier.
- Jean Maximilien Lamarque led 10,000 men into La Vendée to quell a Royalist insurrection in that region.

== Upper Rhine frontier ==
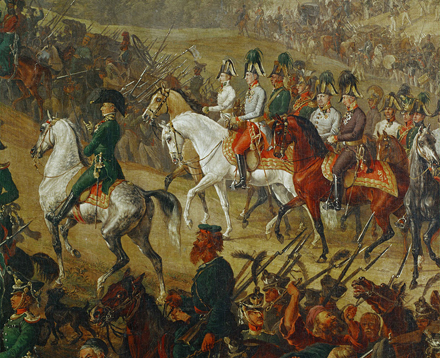
Emperor Francis I of Austria and his Chancellor Prince Clemens Metternich crossing the Vosges Mountains on 2 July 1815 followed by other dignitaries and surrounded by Seventh Coalition soldiers.

=== Coalition order of battle ===
==== Army of the Upper Rhine (Austro-German Army) ====
The Austrian military contingent was divided into three armies. This was the largest of these armies, commanded by Field Marshal Karl Philipp, Prince of Schwarzenberg. Its target was Paris. This Austrian contingent was joined by those of the following nations of the German Confederation: Kingdom of Bavaria, Kingdom of Württemberg, Grand Duchy of Baden, Grand Duchy of Hesse (Hessen-Darmstadt), Free City of Frankfurt, Principality of Reuss Elder Line, and the Principality of Reuss Junior Line. In addition, there were contingents from Fulda and Isenburg. These were recruited by the Austrians from German territories that were in the process of losing their independence through annexation by other countries at the Congress of Vienna. Finally, these were joined by the contingents of the Kingdom of Saxony, Duchy of Saxe-Coburg-Saalfeld, Duchy of Saxe-Meiningen, and the Duchy of Saxe-Hildburghausen. Its composition in June was:

Corps	Commander	Men	Battalions	Squadrons	Batteries
I Corps	Master General of the Ordnance, Hieronymus Karl Graf von Colloredo-Mansfeld	24,400	86	16	8
II Corps	General Prince Friedrich Franz Xaver of Hohenzollern-Hechingen	34,360	36	86	11
III Corps	Field Marshal Crown Prince William of Württemberg	43,814	44	32	9
IV Corps (Bavarian Army)	Field Marshal Prince Karl Philipp von Wrede	67,040	46	66	16
Austrian Reserve Corps	General der Kavallerie Archduke Ferdinand Karl Joseph of Austria-Este	44,800	38	86	10
Blockade Corps		33,314	38	8	6
Saxon Corps		16,774	18	10	6
Totals		264,492	246	844	66

==== Swiss army ====
This army was composed entirely of Swiss troops. The Swiss General Niklaus Franz von Bachmann commanded this army. This force was to observe any French forces that operated near its borders. Its composition in July was:

- I Division – Colonel von Gady
- II Division – Colonel Fuessly
- III Division – Colonel d'Affry
- Reserve Division – Colonel-Quartermaster Finsler

Total: 37,000

=== Planning ===
According to the general plan of operations devised by Prince Schwarzenberg, this army was to cross the Rhine in two columns. The right column—consisting of the III Corps, under Field Marshal the Crown Prince of Württemberg, and the IV Corps of the Bavarian Army, under Field Marshal Prince von Wrede—was to cross the Rhine between Germersheim and Mannheim. The left column—consisting of the I Corps under the Master General of the Ordnance, Count Colloredo, and the II Corps under General Prince Hohenzollern-Hechingen, together with the Austrian Reserve Corps, the whole being commanded by General Archduke Ferdinand—was to cross the Rhine between Basel and Rheinfelden. The column formed by the right wing was to be supported by the Imperial Russian Army under Field Marshal Count Barclay de Tolly, which was expected to assemble at Kaiserslautern by 1 July. The initial objective of the operations was the concentration of the Army of the Upper Rhine and the Russian Army at Nancy.

=== Start of the campaign ===
As soon as Prince Schwarzenberg was informed of the commencement of hostilities in Belgium, he ordered the advance of his army. The IV (Bavarian) Corps was directed to cross the Sarre immediately and, by turning through the Vosges Mountains, to cut off the French V Corps under General Rapp—collected in the environs of Strasbourg—from its base of operations and intercept its communications with the interior of France.

A Russian Corps under General Count Lambert, forming the advanced guard of the army of Count Barclay de Tolly, was attached to the IV (Bavarian) Corps of Prince Wrede; he was to employ it principally in maintaining communication with the North German Corps under Prussian General von Hake.

=== Austrian right wing ===
==== Austrian IV Corps ====
On 19 June, the Bavarian Army crossed the Rhine at Mannheim and Oppenheim, advancing towards the Sarre. On 20 June, there were some minor skirmishes between outposts near Landau and Dahn. On 23 June, the Austrian army, having approached the Sarre, proceeded in two columns to take possession of the crossings at Saarbrücken and Sarreguemines.

The right column, under Lieutenant General Count Karl August von Beckers zu Westerstetten, attacked Saarbrücken, where it was opposed by the French General Louis Auguste François Mariage. The Bavarians captured the suburb and the bridge, penetrating into the town along with the retiring French. They captured four officers and seventy men, and killed or wounded one hundred, suffering a loss of three officers and fifty to sixty men killed and wounded. Count Beckers occupied the town, posted his division on the heights towards Forbach, and detached patrols along the road to Metz as far as St. Avold and to the right along the Sarre as far as Saarlouis.

The left column, consisting of the First Infantry Division under Lieutenant General Baron Clemens von Raglovich and the First Cavalry Division under Prince Charles of Bavaria, advanced against Sarreguemines, where the French had constructed a tête-de-pont on the right bank of the river. After some resistance, this was seized by the Bavarians; Baron von Ragliovich marched through the town and took up a position on the opposite heights, commanding the roads leading to Bouquenom and Lunéville.

The Fourth Infantry Division, under Lieutenant General Friedrich, Freiherr von Zoller, advanced towards the fortress of Bitche, which the French commandant, General Charles Auguste Creutzer, refused to surrender.

The Russian corps under Count Lambert, attached to the right wing of Prince Wrede's Army, advanced as far as Ottweiler and Ramstein.

===== Prince Wrede halts at Nancy =====
On 24 June, Prince Wrede occupied Bouquenom and detached the cavalry division under Prince Charles towards Phalsbourg to observe it. His second, third, and fourth divisions, along with the reserve, were collected at Sarreguemines. The Russian troops under Count Lambert occupied Saarbrück, having previously detached the cavalry under Lieutenant General Czernitscheff as far as Saint-Avold.

On 26 June, Prince Wrede's headquarters were at Morhange; on 27 June, his advanced posts penetrated as far as Nancy, where he established his headquarters on 28 June. From St. Dieuze, Wrede detached units to the left to discover the movements of General Rapp, who was still on the Rhine and whose retreat had been cut off by the occupation of Nancy.

Prince Wrede halted at Nancy to await the arrival of the Austrian and Russian corps. Upon his right, Lieutenant General Czernitscheff crossed the Moselle on 29 June within sight of Metz; on 3 July, he stormed the town of Châlons-sur-Marne. The garrison had promised to make no resistance yet fired upon the Russian advanced guard; the cavalry immediately dismounted, scaled the ramparts, broke open the gates, killed part of the garrison, captured the remainder (including the French General Rigault), and pillaged the town.

After remaining four days in the vicinity of Nancy and Lunéville, Prince Wrede received an order from Prince Schwarzenberg to move at once upon Paris with the IV (Bavarian) Corps, which was destined to become the advanced guard of the Austrian Army of the Upper Rhine. This order was given following the request by the Duke of Wellington and Prince Blücher that the Austrian Army of the Upper Rhine afford immediate support to their operations in front of Paris. On 5 July, the main body of the Bavarian Army reached Châlons, in the vicinity of which it remained during 6 July. On this day, its advanced posts communicated by Épernay with the Prussian Army. On 7 July, Prince Wrede received intelligence of the Convention of Paris and, at the same time, directions to move towards the Loire. On 8 July, Lieutenant General Czernitscheff encountered the French between Talus-Saint-Prix and Montmirail, driving them across the Morin towards the Seine. Prior to the arrival of the IV (Bavarian) Corps at Château-Thierry, the French garrison had abandoned the place, leaving behind several pieces of artillery and ammunition. On 10 July, the Bavarian Army took up a position between the Seine and the Marne, and Prince Wrede's headquarters were at La Ferté-sous-Jouarre.

==== Austrian III Corps ====
On 22 June, a portion of the Austrian III Corps under the Crown Prince of Württemberg took possession of the entrenchments of Germersheim on the left bank of the Rhine. Lieutenant Field Marshal Count Ludwig von Wallmoden-Gimborn was posted with ten battalions and four squadrons to observe and blockade the fortress of Landau and the Queich line. The main body of the corps stood between Bruchsal and Philippsburg. On 23 June, the corps crossed the Rhine at Germersheim and passed the line of the Queich without opposition.

The Crown Prince was directed to proceed by Wissembourg and Haguenau to complete, in conjunction with the IV (Bavarian) Corps, the plan of intercepting General Rapp's retreat.

On 24 June, the III Corps advanced to Bergzabern and Niederotterbach, engaged the French at both locations, and drove them back. Count Wallmoden left a small detachment to observe Landau and advanced with the remainder of his force as far as Rheinzabern. On 25 June, the Crown Prince ordered the advance towards the Lines of Wissembourg in two columns. The first column assembled at Bergzabern, and the second moved forward by Niederotterbach. Count Wallmoden was directed to advance upon Lauterbourg. The Crown Prince advanced his corps still further along the Haguenau road. His advanced guard pushed on to Ingolsheim, and the main body of the III Corps reached the Lines of Wissembourg, which the French abandoned during the night, falling back upon the Forest of Haguenau and occupying the large village of Surbourg. On 26 June, the Crown Prince attacked and defeated the French at Surbourg with his right column, whilst the left column under Count Wallmoden was equally successful in an attack on the French General Rothenburg, posted with 6,000 infantry and a regiment of cavalry at Seltz. On the following day, General Rapp fell back upon the defile of Brumath; he quit this position during the night and took up a favourable position to the rear of the Souffel, near Strasbourg. His force comprised twenty-four battalions of infantry, four regiments of cavalry, and numerous artillery, amounting to nearly 24,000 men.

The Crown Prince of Württemberg engaged General Rapp's Army of the Rhine on 28 June at the Battle of La Suffel; despite outnumbering the French two to one, the Austrian forces were repelled. Rapp, however, withdrew into the fortress of Strasbourg shortly after the action, the Austrian numerical advantage proving decisive. The losses of the III Corps on this occasion amounted to 75 officers and 2,050 men killed and wounded, while those of the French were about 3,000 men.

=== Austrian left wing ===
The Austrian I and II Corps and the Reserve Corps, forming the left wing of the Austrian Army of the Upper Rhine, crossed the river at Rheinfelden and Basel on the night of 25 June. On 26 June, the I Corps under Count Colloredo was directed upon Belfort and Montbéliard; on the same day, the Austrians invested the fortress of Huningue. The advanced guard of the Austrian I Corps skirmished with a French detachment of 3,000 men belonging to the VIII Corps (also known as Armée du Jura) of General Lecourbe, forcing it to withdraw as far as Dannemarie. On 28 June, the Austrian I Corps attacked the French near Chavannes, between Dannemarie and Belfort, driving the French force of 8,000 infantry and 500 cavalry back upon Belfort. Major-General von Scheither of the I Corps was detached against Montbéliard, a town fortified and defended by a citadel. After maintaining a destructive fire against the place, the Austrian troops stormed it, suffering a loss of 25 officers and 1,000 men killed and wounded.

=== General suspension of hostilities ===
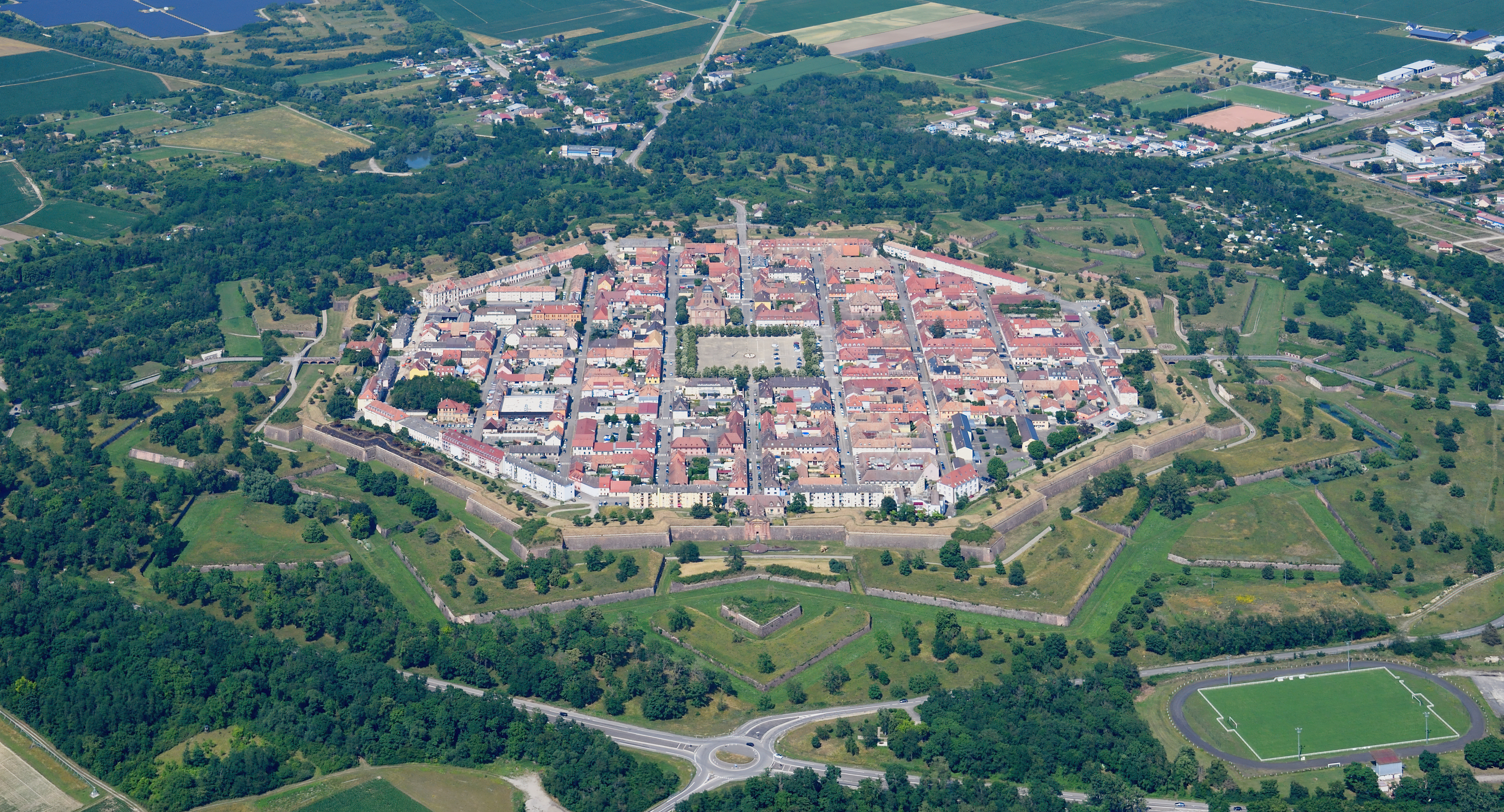
Aerial photograph of Neuf-Brisach.

The III Corps remained in front of Strasbourg until 4 July, when it was relieved by the arrival of the Austrian II Corps under Prince Hohenzollern from the vicinity of Colmar. At this point, the advanced guard of the Austrian Reserve Corps under Lieutenant Field Marshal Stutterheim moved upon Remiremont, and the main body upon St. Marie aux Mines. The Austrian Reserve Corps reached Raon l'Etape, subsequently moving on 10 July to Neufchâteau. The III Corps under the Crown Prince of Württemberg marched into the vicinity of Molsheim.

On 7 July, Württemberg reached Lunéville; however, instead of proceeding to its original destination of Nancy, the III Corps took the road to Neufchâteau on 9 July, advancing in columns: one via Bayon and the other via Rambervillers. These two columns continued their advance, the first by Vaucouleurs, Joinville, Brienne-le-Château, Troyes, and Auxerre; the other by Neufchâteau, Chaumont, Bar-sur-Aube, Vendeuvre-sur-Barse, Bar-sur-Seine, and Châtillon. They halted at these points (Auxerre and Châtillon) on 18 July. On 21 July, the corps entered into cantonments between Montbard and Tonnerre.

With the exception of a few sorties of little consequence, General Rapp remained quiet in the fortress of Strasbourg. The news of the capture of Paris by the British and Prussian troops led to a suspension of hostilities; this was concluded on 24 July and extended to the fortresses of Strasbourg, Landau, La Petite-Pierre, Huningue, Sélestat, Lichtenberg, Phalsbourg, Neuf-Brisach, and Belfort.

== Italian frontier ==
=== Coalition order of battle ===
==== Army of Upper Italy (Austro-Sardinian Army) ====
This was the second largest of Austria's contingents. Its target was Lyon. General Johann Maria Philipp Frimont commanded this army. Its composition in June was:

- I Corps – Feldmarschall-Leutnant Paul von Radivojevich
- II Corps – Feldmarschall-Leutnant Ferdinand, Graf Bubna von Littitz
- Reserve Corps – Feldmarschall-Leutnant Franz Mauroy de Merville
- Sardinian Corps – General Count Latour

Total: 50,000.

==== Austrian Army (Army of Naples) ====
General Frederick Bianchi commanded the Austrian Army of Naples. (Note: Chandler names General Onasco as the commander of the Austrian Army of Naples (Chandler 1981, p. 30) however, both Plotho and Vaudoncourt name Bianchi as commander of this army (Plotho 1818, pp. 76, 77 (Appendix), and Vaudoncourt 1826, p. 94 (Book I, Chapter I))) This was the smaller of Austria's military contingents, and it had already defeated Joachim Murat's army in the Neapolitan War. Its objective in the current campaign was the capture of Marseille and Toulon. It was not composed of Neapolitans, as the army's name might suggest and as one author has supposed. There was, however, a Sardinian force in this area forming the garrison of Nice under Lieutenant-General Giovanni Pietro Luigi Cacherano d'Osasco, which may have been where this misunderstanding arose. The Army of Naples composition in June was:

- I Corps – General Neipperg
- II Corps – General Mohr
- Reserve Corps – General Nugent

Total: 23,000

=== French order of battle ===
The French Army of the Var (II Corps of Observation) was based at Toulon and commanded by Marshal Guillaume Marie Anne Brune. This army was charged with the suppression of any potential royalist uprisings and to observe Bianchi's 'Army of Naples'. Its composition in June was:

- 24th Infantry Division
- 25th Infantry Division
- 14th Chasseurs à Cheval Cavalry Regiment
- 22 guns

Total: 5,500–6,116 men.

=== Start of the campaign ===
The Austrian Army of Italy, composed of Austrian and Sardinian troops and amounting to 60,000 men, was under the command of General Baron Frimont. It was destined to act against the French Army of the Alps under Marshal Suchet, posted in the vicinity of Chambéry and Grenoble. The size of Suchet's force is uncertain, estimated at 13,000 to 20,000 men; but the Corps of Observation on the Var in the vicinity of Antibes and Toulon, under Marshal Brune, amounted to 10,000 men and was not occupied with any enemy in its front.

Baron Frimont's army was divided into two corps: the I Corps under Lieutenant Field Marshal Radivojevich was to advance by the Valais towards Lyon; the II Corps under Lieutenant Field Marshal Count Bubna, positioned in Piedmont, was to penetrate into the south of France through Savoy.

==== French abandon the passes of the Jura ====
Marshal Suchet had received orders from Napoleon to commence operations on 14 June and, by rapid marches, to secure the mountain passes in the Valais and in Savoy (then part of the Kingdom of Sardinia) to close them to the Austrians. On 15 June, his troops advanced at all points for the purpose of gaining the frontier from Montmélian as far as Geneva, which he invested. Thence he proposed to obtain possession of the important passes of Meillerie and St. Maurice to check the advance of the Austrian columns from the Valais. At Meillerie, the French were driven back by the advanced guard of the Austrian right column on 21 June. By means of forced marches, the whole of this column, which Baron Frimont himself accompanied, reached the Arve on 27 June. The left column under Count Bubna crossed Mont Cenis on 24 and 25 June. On 28 June, the column was sharply opposed by the French at Conflans; however, the Austrians succeeded in gaining possession of it.

To secure the passage of the river Arve, the advanced guard of the right column moved to Bonneville on its left bank on 27 June, but the French, who had already fortified this place, maintained a stout resistance. In the meantime, however, the Austrians gained possession of the passage at Carrouge, placing the French under the necessity of evacuating Bonneville and abandoning the valley of the Arve. The Austrian column passed Geneva and drove the French from the heights of Grand Saconex and from St. Genix. On 29 June, this part of the Austrian army moved towards the Jura and, on 1 July, made dispositions for attacking the redoubts and entrenchments which the French had thrown up to defend the passes. The most vigorous assault was made upon the Pass of Les Rousses, but the Austrians were driven back. Reserves were brought up, and when the French quit their entrenchments to meet them, they were exposed to a flank attack by cavalry and artillery. The pass was captured by the Austrians, and the French were compelled to abandon both it and the other passes of the Jura. The Austrian advance guard pursued the French, reaching Saint-Claude in the evening on the road leading to the left from Gex, and St. Laurent in the original direction of the attack beyond Les Rousses.

==== Fort l'Ecluse surrendered to the Austrians ====
In the meantime, the Austrian Reserve Corps under Feldmarschalleutnant (Major-General) Franz Mauroy de Merville was directed to advance and throw back the French upon the Rhône. The latter, in retreating, destroyed the bridge of Seyssel and, by holding the Fort l'Ecluse, closed the road from Geneva to Lyon. A redoubt had been constructed in front of the fort which completely commanded the approach. It was stormed and captured by the Hungarian 'Prince Esterhazy' Infantry Regiment (IR.32). The fort itself was turned by the Reserve Corps along the left bank of the Rhône with the design of forcing the passage at the Perte du Rhône. Here the French had constructed a tête-de-pont; however, they were forced to abandon it in consequence of a movement made by the I Corps under Feldmarschalleutnant Radivojevich. On retiring, the French destroyed the stone bridge, rendering it necessary for the Austrians to construct temporary bridges over the extremely narrow space between the rocks which confine the stream at this spot. The advanced guard of the Reserve Corps under General Count Hardegg first crossed the Rhône and found the French posted at Charix, in the rear of Châtillon, on the road to Nantua. Count Hardegg immediately ordered an attack and, after encountering obstinate resistance, forced the French to retire.

The troops of the Austrian I Corps left in front of Fort l'Ecluse had commenced a bombardment; after twenty-six hours, the fort was considerably damaged. A powder magazine exploded, causing a general conflagration. To escape this, the garrison rushed out and surrendered unconditionally to the Austrians; thus, in three days, the high road from Geneva to Lyon was opened to the Army of Italy.

==== Surrender of Lyon ====
On 3 July, General Bogdan, with the advanced guard of the Austrian I Corps, having been reinforced by Lieutenant Field Marshal Radivojevich, attacked the French at Oyonnax, beyond St. Claude, where the French General Jean-Pierre Maransin had taken up a favourable position with a force of 2,000 men. The Austrians turned Maransin's left flank and forced the French to retire. The I Corps reached Bourg-en-Bresse on 9 July.

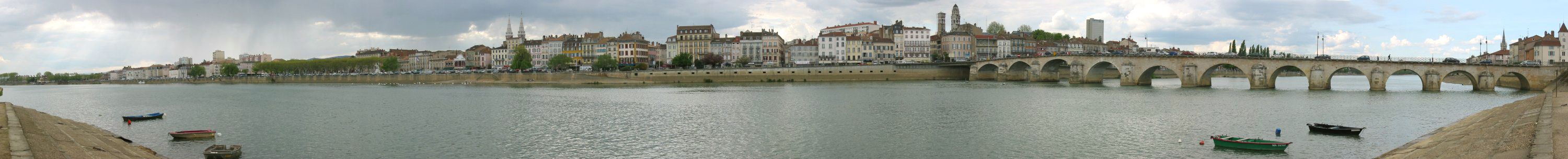
Mâcon and the Saône River

On 10 July, a detachment under Major-General von Pflüger was pushed on to Mâcon on the Saône, gaining possession of the tête-de-pont constructed there and of the place itself.

On 7 July, the II Corps under Count Bubna reached Echelles. A detachment consisting principally of Sardinian troops under Lieutenant General Count Latour had been directed to observe Grenoble, where its advanced guard arrived on 4 July. On 6 July, the suburbs were attacked, and the communication between Grenoble and Lyon was cut off. The garrison, consisting of eight battalions of the National Guard, offered to capitulate on 9 July on the condition of being permitted to return to their homes. That a vigorous defence might have been maintained was evident from the fact that the Austrians found fifty-four guns, eight mortars, and large quantities of provisions in the place.

Count Bubna's II Corps and the Reserve Corps, by simultaneous movements, assembled together in front of Lyon on 9 July. An armistice was solicited by the garrison on 11 July and granted upon condition that Lyon and the entrenched camp should be evacuated and that the French VII Corps (Marshal Suchet's) retire behind the Loire, keeping Suchet's advanced posts within a stipulated line of demarcation.

==== General armistice ====
On 9 July, the Sardinian Lieutenant-General d'Osasco, who had been detached to Nice, concluded an armistice with Marshal Brune, commander of the Armée du Var, facing the Maritime Alps. (Note: David Chandler gives a slightly different account: Brune fell back slowly, before Neapolitan forces under the command of General d'Osasco, into the fortress city of Toulon and that Brune did not surrender the city and the naval arsenal contained within until 31 July (Chandler 1981, p. 181).)

Having secured possession of the line of the Rhône as far south as its confluence with the Isère, as well as the section of the Saône between Mâcon and Lyon, the Army of Italy proceeded towards the upper course of the latter river. Leaving the II Corps under Count Bubna at Lyon to face Marshal Suchet, the I Corps marched upon Chalon-sur-Saône to seize the tête-de-pont there. At this time, the French Armée du Jura under General Lecourbe was at Salins, between Dole and Pontarlier. As Besançon had not yet been invested, Baron Frimont detached a part of the Reserve Corps under General Hecht to Salins, while General Folseis was detached from the I Corps towards Dole. The advanced guard of the I Corps had arrived in front of the tête-de-pont at Châlons and completed its dispositions for attack when the place surrendered. By the simultaneous advance of Hecht upon Salins and Folseis from Dole upon Besançon, the retreat of the French General Laplane was completely cut off. This led to a convention which stipulated the dissolution of the National Guard, the surrender of all officers, and the abandonment of one of the forts of Salins to the Austrians.

On 20 July, the I Corps advanced from Chalon-sur-Saône as far as Autun. With Besançon having been occupied by the Austrian troops of the Army of the Upper Rhine, a junction was effected with the latter by the Army of Italy near Dijon; this ended all hostilities in that region of France.

== Other campaigns ==
The Russians followed the northern wing of the Austrian Army of the Upper Rhine into France and towards Paris; to their north, the German Corps assisted elements of Blücher's and Wellington's armies in subduing French frontier forts that did not immediately surrender to Coalition forces.

=== Russian army ===
==== Russian order of battle ====
Field Marshal Michael Andreas Barclay de Tolly commanded the First Russian Army. In June, it consisted of the following:

- III Army Corps – General Dmitry Dokhturov
- IV Army Corps – General Nikolay Raevsky
- V Army Corps – General Fabian Gottlieb von Osten-Sacken
- VI Army Corps – General Louis Alexandre Andrault de Langeron
- VII Army Corps – General Ivan Sabaneev
- Reserve Grenadier Corps – General Aleksey Yermolov* II Reserve Cavalry Corps – General Ferdinand Wintzingerode
- Artillery Reserve – Colonel Bogoslavsky

Total: 200,000

==== Campaign ====
The main body of the First Russian Army, commanded by Field Marshal Count Barclay de Tolly and amounting to 167,950 men, crossed Germany rapidly in three main columns. The right column, commanded by General Doctorov, advanced by way of Kalisz, Torgau, Leipzig, Erfurt, Hanau, Frankfurt, and Hochheim am Main towards Mainz. The central column, commanded by General Baron Sacken, advanced through Breslau, Dresden, Zwickau, Bayreuth, Nuremberg, Aschaffenburg, Dieburg, and Gross Gerau towards Oppenheim. The left column, commanded by General Count Langeron, proceeded through Prague, Aube, Adelsheim, Neckar, and Heidelberg towards Mannheim. The vanguards of the columns had reached the Middle Rhine when hostilities were about to break out on the Belgian frontier. The Russians crossed the Rhine at Mannheim on 25 June and followed the Austrian Army of the Upper Rhine. The majority of the force reached Paris and its vicinity by the middle of July.

=== German Corps ===
The German Corps (or the North German Federal Army) was part of the Prussian Army but was tasked to act independently much further south. It was composed of contingents from the following nations of the German Confederation: Electorate of Hesse, Grand Duchy of Mecklenburg-Schwerin, Grand Duchy of Mecklenburg-Strelitz, Grand Duchy of Saxe-Weimar-Eisenach, Duchy of Oldenburg, Duchy of Saxe-Gotha, Duchy of Anhalt-Bernburg, Duchy of Anhalt-Dessau, Duchy of Anhalt-Kothen, Principality of Schwarzburg-Rudolstadt, Principality of Schwarzburg-Sondershausen, Principality of Waldeck and Pyrmont, Principality of Lippe, and the Principality of Schaumburg-Lippe.

Fearing that Napoleon was going to attack him first, Blücher ordered this army to march north to join the rest of his own forces. The Prussian General Friedrich Graf Kleist von Nollendorf initially commanded this army; when he fell ill on 18 June, he was replaced temporarily by the Hessen-Kassel General von Engelhardt (commander of the Hessen division) and then by Lieutenant-General Karl Georg Albrecht Ernst von Hake. Its composition in June was: (Note: A third brigade, the Mecklenburg Brigade commanded by General Prince of Mecklenburg-Schwerin is included in Plotho, but not by Hofschröer & Embleton (Plotho 1818, p. 56; Hofschröer & Embleton 2014, p. 42).)

- Hessen-Kassel Division (three Hessian infantry brigades, cavalry brigade, and two artillery batteries), commanded by General Engelhardt
- Thuringian Brigade (12 battalions of infantry), commanded by Major-General Egloffstein (Weimar)

Total: 25,000

The German Corps, composed of contingent forces supplied by the small principalities of north Germany, assembled in the middle of April in the vicinity of Koblenz. It amounted to 26,200 men, divided into thirty battalions of infantry, twelve squadrons of cavalry, and two and a half batteries of artillery; it was commanded by General Friedrich Graf Kleist von Nollendorf. Later, it crossed the Rhine at Koblenz and Neuwied, taking up a position on the Moselle and the Sarre; its right communicated with the Prussian II Corps (Pirch I), and its left with the Austrian IV (Bavarian) Corps (Prince von Wrede) at Zweibrücken. Its advanced posts extended along the French frontier from Arlon to Mertzig. Its headquarters were at Trier on the Moselle.

It remained in this position until 16 June when its commander, General von Engelhardt (in the absence of Count Kleist, who was ill), advanced from Trier to Arlon, arriving on 19 June. Here the corps remained until 21 June, when it received an order from Prince Blücher to march into France via Bastogne and Neufchâteau and capture the fortresses of Sedan and Bouillon. On 22 June, the Corps commenced its march in two columns: the first by Neufchâteau toward Sedan, the other by Recogne toward Bouillon. Sedan capitulated on 25 June after a few days' bombardment. An attempt was made to take Bouillon by a coup de main, but its garrison was strong enough to frustrate this project. The place was not considered of sufficient importance to warrant a regular siege; it was simply invested from 25 June until 21 August, when a battalion of the Netherlands Reserve Army under Lieutenant-General Baron Ralph Dundas Tindal took over. (Similar to the German Corps, the Netherlands Reserve Army did not take part in the early actions of the Waterloo Campaign).

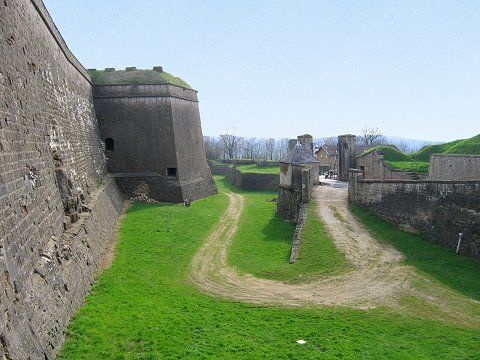
Montmédy Fortress

On 28 June, Lieutenant-General Karl Georg Albrecht Ernst von Hake, who had been appointed to the command of the German Corps, directed the advance guard to move upon Charleville, which lies beneath the guns of the Fortress of Mézières, and to storm the town. The capture was successfully executed by Hessian battalions and greatly facilitated the siege of Mézières. Mobile columns were detached to observe the fortresses of Montmédy, Laon, and Rheims. The last-named place capitulated on 8 July, and the garrison of 4,000 men retired behind the Loire.

Finding that his summons to surrender was ignored by the commandant General Jacques Lemoine—notwithstanding the bombardment of Mézières commenced on 27 June—Lieutenant-General von Hake undertook a regular siege of the place, opening trenches on 2 August. On 13 August, the French garrison surrendered the town and retired into the citadel, which surrendered on 1 September.

The efforts of the German Corps were now directed upon the fortress of Montmédy, around which it had succeeded in positioning twelve batteries by 13 September. After obstinate resistance, the garrison concluded a convention on 20 September by which it was to retire, with arms and baggage, behind the Loire. After the capture of Montmédy, the German Corps went into cantonments in the department of the Ardennes, whence it returned home in November.

=== British Mediterranean contingent ===
This was Great Britain's minor military expedition. It was composed of British troops from the garrison of Genoa under General Sir Hudson Lowe. The troops were transported and supported by the Royal Navy's Mediterranean Fleet commanded by Lord Exmouth. The British landed at Marseille to support a French Royalist uprising that had expelled Marshal Brune's garrison. The British expeditionary force landed before Marshal Brune was able to advance from Toulon with reinforcements from the Armée du Var. The National Guard of Marseille, reinforced by 4,000 British soldiers, marines, and seamen, marched out to meet this advance. Faced by this force, Brune retreated to Toulon and subsequently surrendered the city to the Coalition forces.

=== La Vendée ===
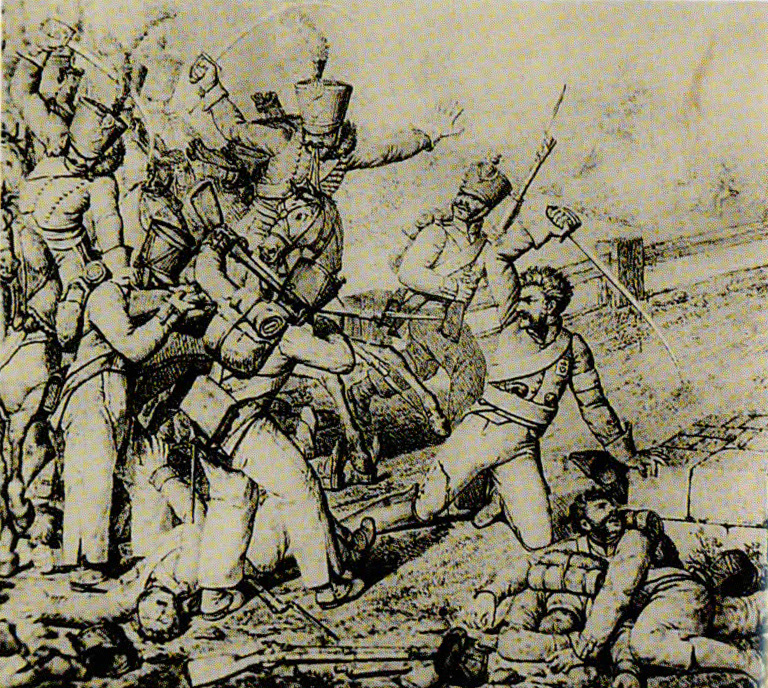
Battle of Thouars 20 June 1815

Army of the West – Armée de l'Ouest (also known as the Army of the Vendée and the Army of the Loire) was originally formed as the Corps of Observation of the Vendée. This army was established to suppress the Royalist revolt in the Vendée region of France, which had rebelled upon Napoleon Bonaparte's return. It was commanded by General Jean Maximilien Lamarque.

The total planned strength was 10,000 to 12,000 men, but the highest estimate of total actual strength is 6,000 men.

Provence and Brittany, known to contain many royalist sympathisers, did not open revolt, but the Vendée did. The Vendée Royalists successfully took Bressuire and Cholet before they were defeated by General Lamarque at the Battle of Rocheserviere on 20 June. They signed the Treaty of Cholet six days later on 26 June.

== Other mobilisations ==
For mobilisations that did not take an active part in operations, or were merely planned mobilisations, see the article "Military mobilisation during the Hundred Days".

== See also ==
- Fortifications of Vauban
