= Hundred Days order of battle =

During the Hundred Days of 1815, both the Coalition nations and the First French Empire of Napoleon Bonaparte mobilised for war. This article describes the deployment of forces in early June 1815 just before the start of the Waterloo Campaign and the minor campaigns of 1815.

== French ==
Upon assumption of the throne, Napoleon found that he was left with little by the Bourbons and that the state of the Army was 56,000 troops of which 46,000 were ready to campaign. By the end of May, the total armed forces available to Napoleon had reached 198,000 with 66,000 more in depots training up but not yet ready for deployment.

=== Waterloo Campaign ===
By the end of May, Napoleon had deployed his forces as follows:

- I Corps (Jean-Baptiste Drouet, Comte d'Erlon) cantoned between Lille and Valenciennes.
- II Corps (Honoré Charles Reille) cantoned between Valenciennes and Avesnes.
- III Corps (Dominique Joseph Vandamme) cantoned around Rocroi.
- IV Corps (Étienne Maurice Gérard) cantoned at Metz.
- VI Corps (Georges Mouton, Count de Lobau) cantoned at Laon.
- Cavalry Reserve (Emmanuel, marquis de Grouchy) cantoned at Guise.
- Imperial Guard (Édouard Mortier, Duke of Trévise) at Paris.

The preceding corps were to be formed into L'Armée du Nord (the "Army of the North"), led by Napoleon Bonaparte and would participate in the Waterloo Campaign.

=== Armies of observation ===
For the defence of France, Bonaparte deployed his remaining forces within France observing France's enemies, foreign and domestic, intending to delay the former and suppress the latter. By June, they were organised as follows:

V Corps – Armée du Rhin (Jean Rapp), cantoned near Strassburg.

- 15th Infantry Division (Commanded by General Henri Rottembourg)
- 16th Infantry Division (Commanded by General Joseph Jean-Baptiste Albert)
- 17th Infantry Division (Commanded by General Charles Louis Dieudonné Grandjean)
  On 20 June 1815 Rapp's three infantry divisions contained 28 Battalions. These 28 Battalions consisted of both Line and Light Infantry Regiments. Belonging to the above three Infantry Divisions were the following Line Infantry Regiments: 18th (3 Battalions), 32nd (2 Battalions), 36th (2 Battalions), 39th (2 Battalions), 40th (2 Battalions), 57th (3 Battalions), 58th (2 Battalions), 101st (2 Battalions), 103rd (2 Battalions) and the 104th (2 Battalions). The 7th Light Infantry Regiment (3 Battalions) and the 10th Light Infantry Regiment (3 Battalions) also belonged to Rapp's Infantry Divisions.
- 7th Cavalry Division (Commanded by General Christophe Antoine Merlin)
  - 1st Brigade (Commanded by General François Grouvel)
    2nd and 7th Chasseurs à Cheval Regiments
  - 2nd Brigade (Commanded by General Favier)
    11th and 19th Dragoon Regiments
- National Guard Brigade (Commanded by General Sigismond Frédéric de Berckheim)
  The 3rd, 4th, and 5th Battalions of the National Guard of the Bas-Rhin and the 6th, 7th and 8th Battalions of the National Guard of the Haut-Rhin. Two National Guard Lancer Cavalry Regiments also appear to have been attached to Berckheim's command – a Haut-Rhin National Guard Lancer Regiment (137 men) and a Bas-Rhin National Guard Lancer Regiment (405 men)
- Artillery: 46 guns
- Total 20,000–23,000 men.

VII Corps – Armée des Alpes (Suchet). Based at Lyon, this army was charged with the defence of Lyon and to observe the Austro-Sardinian army of Frimont. Its composition in June was:

- 22nd Infantry Division (Commanded by General Michel-Marie Pacthod)
  - 1st Brigade (Commanded by General Jean Mesclop)
    7th Line Infantry Regiment (3 Battalions) and the 14th Line Infantry Regiment (2 Battalions)
  - 2nd Brigade (Commanded by General Jean Louis Eloi Bouvard)
    20th Line Infantry Regiment (3 Battalions) and the 24th Line Infantry Regiment (2 Battalions)
- 23rd Infantry Division (Commanded by General Joseph Marie, Count Dessaix)
  - 1st Brigade (Commanded by General Jean Montfalcon)
    67th Line Infantry Regiment (3 Battalions) and the 6th Light Infantry Regiment (2 Battalions). The two battalions of the 6th Light Infantry Regiment had been detached to Marshal Brune's II Corps of Observation – see below
  - 2nd Brigade (Commanded by Brigadier General (Jean Revest)
    42nd Line Infantry Regiment (2 battalions) and the 53rd Line Infantry Regiment (2 Battalions)
- 15th Cavalry Division (Commanded by General François Jean Baptiste Quesnel)
  - 1st Brigade (Commanded by General Bernard Meyer de Schauensee)
    10th Chasseurs à Cheval and the 18th Dragoon Regiments. This division had only one brigade.
- 6th National Guard Infantry Division
- 7th National Guard Infantry Division
- 8th National Guard Infantry Division
- 42–46 guns
- Total 13,000–23,500 men

I Corps of Observation – Armée du Jura Based at Belfort and commanded by General Claude Lecourbe, this army was to observe any Austrian movement through Switzerland and also observe the Swiss army of General Bachmann. Its composition in June was:

- 18th Infantry Division (Commanded by General Louis Jean Nicolas Abbé)
  - 1st Brigade (Commanded by General Martel)
    6th Line Infantry Regiment (2 Battalions) and the 52nd Line Infantry Regiment (2 Battalions)
  - 2nd Brigade (Commanded by General Clavel)
    62nd Line Infantry Regiment (2 Battalions) and the 102nd Line Infantry Regiment (2 Battalions)
- 8th Cavalry Division (Commanded by General Bertrand-Pierre Castex)
  - 1st Brigade (Commanded by General Charles-Claude Meuziau)
    2nd and 3rd Hussar Regiments
  - 2nd Brigade (Commanded by General Rambourg)
    13th Chasseurs à Cheval Regiment
- 3rd National Guard Infantry Division
- 4th National Guard Infantry Division
- Artillery: Three foot artillery batteries – two of which replaced a horse artillery battery which was sent back to Rapp's V Corps (24 guns)
- Total 5,392–8,400 men

II Corps of Observation – Armée du Var. Based at Toulon and commanded by Marshal Guillaume Marie Anne Brune, this army was charged with the suppression of any potential royalist uprisings and to observe General Bianchi's Army of Naples. Its composition in June was:

- 24th Infantry Division;
- 25th Infantry Division;
  Belonging to the above two infantry divisions were the following Line Infantry Regiments: 9th (3 Battalions), 13th (2 Battalions), 16th (2 Battalions), 35th (2 Battalions) and 106th (2 or 3 Battalions). The 14th Light Infantry Regiment (2 Battalions) also belonged to one of these divisions. Attached to Brune's army were two battalions of the 6th Light Infantry Regiment detached from Marshal Suchet's VII Corps.
- Cavalry: 14th Chasseurs à Cheval Regiment;
- Artillery: 22 guns
- Total 5,500–6,116 men.

III Corps of Observation – Army of the Pyrenees orientales. Based at Toulouse and commanded by General Charles Mathieu Isidore Decaen, this army observed the eastern Spanish frontier. Its composition in June was:

- 26th Infantry Division (Commanded by General Jean Isidore Harispe);
  - 1st Brigade (Commanded by General Beauvais)
    3rd Light Infantry Regiment (2 Battalions)
  - 2nd Brigade (Commanded by General Bagnetis)
    66th Line Infantry Regiment (3 Battalions) and the 94th Line Infantry Regiment (2 Battalions)
- Cavalry: 5th Chasseurs à Cheval Regiment (Commanded by General Cavrois);
- Artillery: Three foot artillery batteries (24 guns);
- Total 3,516–7,600 men.

IV Corps of Observation – Army of the Pyrenees occidentales. Based at Bordeaux and commanded by General Bertrand Clauzel, this army observed the western Spanish frontier. Its composition in June was:

- 27th Infantry Division (Commanded by General Philibert Fressinet)
  - 1st Brigade (Commanded by General Joseph Charras)
    60th Line Infantry Regiment (2 Battalions)
  - 2nd Brigade (Commanded by General Dauture)
    79th Line Infantry Regiment (2 Battalions) and the 81st Line Infantry Regiment (2 Battalions)
- Cavalry: 15th Chasseurs à Cheval Regiment (Commanded by General Guyon)
- Artillery: Three foot artillery batteries (24 guns)
- Total 3,516–6,800 men

Army of the West – Armée de l'Ouest (also known as the Army of the Vendée). Commanded by General Jean Maximilien Lamarque, the army was formed to suppress the Royalist insurrection in the Vendée region of France, which remained loyal to King Louis XVIII during the Hundred Days. The army contained line units as well as gendarmes and volunteers. Its composition in June was:

- One Un-numbered Infantry Division (Commanded by General Michel-Sylvestre Brayer);
  - 1st Brigade (Commanded by General Etienne Estève)
    III/8th Light Infantry Regiment, a Battalion of the 27th Line Infantry Regiment, I/47th Line Infantry Regiment and Foot Gendarmes (170 men)
  - 2nd Brigade (Commanded by Colonel Mosnier)
    2nd Young Guard Tirailleur Regiment (2 Battalions) and the 2nd Young Guard Voltigeur Regiment (2 Battalions)
- One Un-numbered Infantry Division (Commanded by General Jean-Pierre Travot);
  - 1st Brigade (Commanded by Colonel Levavasseur)
    Parisian Gendarmes (80 men), Marine Artillerymen (240 men), 15th Line Infantry Regiment (2 Battalions), 43rd Line Infantry Regiment (2 Battalions) and the II/65th Line Infantry Regiment
  - 2nd Brigade (Commanded by Colonel/General Prevost)
    III/14th Line Infantry Regiment, 26th Line Infantry Regiment (3 Battalions) and some volunteer Vendée Chasseurs (28 men)
- Cavalry: The 4th Squadrons of the 2nd Hussar Regiment, 13th Chasseurs à Cheval Regiment, 4th, 5th, 12th, 14th, 16th and 17th Dragoon Regiments
- Artillery: Three foot artillery batteries (24 guns);

Total 10,000–27,000 men.

== Seventh Coalition ==
The Seventh Coalition armies formed to invade France were:

=== Overview ===
The forces at the disposal of the Seventh Coalition for an invasion of France amounted to the better part of a million men. According to the returns laid out in secret sittings at the Congress of Vienna the military resources of the European states that joined the coalition, the number of troops which they could field for active operations—without unduly diminishing the garrison and other services in their respective interiors—amounted to 986,000 men. The size of the principal invasion armies (those designated to proceed to Paris) was as follows:

I	Army of Upper Rhine—(Schwartzenberg) consisting of :		
	Austrians	150,000	
	Bavarians	65,000	
	Württemberg	25,000	
	Baden	16,000	
	Hessians, etc.,	8,000	
I	Army of Upper Rhine—(Schwartzenberg), Total		264,000
II	Army of Lower Rhine—(Blücher) Prussians, Saxons, etc.		155,000
III	Army of Flanders—(Wellington) British, Dutch, Hanoverians, Brunswickers		155,000
IV	First Russian Army—(Barclay de Tolly)		168,000
	Total		742,000

=== Waterloo Campaign ===
==== Wellington's Allied Army (Army of Flanders) ====
Cantoned in the southern part of the United Kingdom of the Netherlands, in what is now Belgium, Field Marshal Arthur Wellesley, 1st Duke of Wellington commanded a coalition army, made up of troops from the duchies of Brunswick, and Nassau and the kingdoms of Hanover, the Netherlands and the United Kingdom.

In June 1815 Wellington's army of 93,000 with headquarters at Brussels was cantoned:

- I Corps (William, Prince of Orange), 30,200, headquarters Braine-le-Comte, disposed in the area Enghien–Genappe–Mons.
- II Corps (Lord Hill), 27,300, headquarters Ath, distributed in the area Ath-Oudenarde–Ghent.
- Reserve (under Wellington himself) 25,500, lay around Brussels.
- Reserve Cavalry (Lord Uxbridge) 9,900, in the valley of the Dendre river, between Geraardsbergen and Ninove.
- Dutch light cavalry observed the frontier into the west of Leuze and Binche

The Netherlands Corps, commanded by Prince Frederick of the Netherlands did not take part in early actions of the Waterloo Campaign (it was posted to a fall back position near Braine), but did besiege some of the frontier fortresses in the rear of Wellington's advancing army.

Alexander I of Russia offered Wellington his II Army Corps under general Wurttemberg, but Wellington was far from keen on accepting this contingent.

==== Prussian Army (Army of the Lower Rhine) ====
This army was composed entirely of Prussians from the provinces of the Kingdom of Prussia, old and recently acquired alike. Field Marshal Gebhard Leberecht von Blücher commanded this army with General August Neidhardt von Gneisenau as his chief of staff and second in command.

Blücher's Prussian army of 116,000 men, with headquarters at Namur, was distributed as follows:

- I Corps (Hans Ernst Karl Graf von Zieten), 30,800, cantoned along the Sambre, headquarters Charleroi, and covering the area Fontaine-l'Évêque–Fleurus–Moustier.
- II Corps (Georg Dubislav Ludwig von Pirch), 31,000, headquarters at Namur, lay in the area Namur-Hannut–Huy.
- III Corps (Johann von Thielmann), 23,900, in the bend of the river Meuse, headquarters Ciney, and disposed in the area Dinant–Huy–Ciney.
- IV Corps (Friedrich Wilhelm Freiherr von Bülow), 30,300, with headquarters at Liège and cantoned around it.

=== Minor campaigns ===
==== German Corps (North German Federal Army) ====
This army was part of the Prussian army above, but was to act independently much further south. It was composed of contingents from the following nations of the German Confederation: Electorate of Hesse, Grand Duchy of Mecklenburg-Schwerin, Grand Duchy of Mecklenburg-Strelitz, Grand Duchy of Saxe-Weimar-Eisenach, Grand Duchy of Oldenburg, Duchy of Saxe-Gotha-Altenburg, Duchy of Anhalt-Bernburg, Duchy of Anhalt-Dessau, Duchy of Anhalt-Kothen, Principality of Schwarzburg-Rudolstadt, Principality of Schwarzburg-Sondershausen, Principality of Waldeck and Pyrmont, Principality of Lippe and the Principality of Schaumburg-Lippe.

Fearing that Napoleon was going to strike him first, Blücher ordered this army to march north to join the rest of his own army. The Prussian General Friedrich Graf Kleist von Nollendorf initially commanded this army before he fell ill on 18 June and was replaced temperately by the Hesse-Kassel General von Engelhardt (who was in command of the Hessen division) and then by Lieutenant General Karl Georg Albrecht Ernst von Hake. Its composition in June was: (Note: A third brigade, the Mecklenburg Brigade commanded by General Prince of Mecklenburg-Schwerin is included in Plotho, but not by Hofschröer & Embleton (Plotho 1818, p. 56; Hofschröer & Embleton 2014, p. 42).)

- Hessen-Kassel Division (Three Hessian Brigades)- General Engelhardt
  - Hessian 1st Brigade (5 battalions) – Major General Prince of Solms-Braunfels
  - Hessian 2nd Brigade (7 bns.) – Major General von Muller
  - Hessian Cavalry Brigade (2 regiments) – Major General von Warburg (Prussian)
  - Hessian Artillery (2 six-pounder batteries) – Major von Bardeleben (Prussian)
- Thuringian Brigade – Major General Egloffstein (Weimar)
  - 1st Provisional Infantry Regiment (4 bns.)
  - 2nd Provisional Infantry Regiment (3 bns.)
  - 3rd Provisional Infantry Regiment (5 bns. including the Oldenburg Line Infantry Regiment (2 bns.))

Total 25,000

==== Russian Army (I Army) ====
Field Marshal Michael Andreas Barclay de Tolly commanded the First Russian Army. In June it consisted of the following:

- III Army Corps – General Dmitry Dokhturov
- IV Army Corps – General Nikolay Raevsky
- V Army Corps – General Fabian Gottlieb von Osten-Sacken
- VI Army Corps – General Louis Alexandre Andrault de Langeron
- VII Army Corps – General Ivan Sabaneev
- Reserve Grenadier Corps – General Aleksey Yermolov
- II Reserve Cavalry Corps – General Ferdinand Wintzingerode
- Artillery Reserve – Colonel Bogoslavsky

Total 200,000

==== Austro-German Army (Army of the Upper Rhine) ====
The Austrian military contingent was divided into three armies. This was the largest of these armies, commanded by Field Marshal Karl Philipp, Prince of Schwarzenberg. Its target was Paris. This Austrian contingent was joined by those of the following nations of the German Confederation: Kingdom of Bavaria, Kingdom of Württemberg, Grand Duchy of Baden, Grand Duchy of Hesse (Hessen-Darmstadt), Free City of Frankfurt, Principality of Reuss Elder Line and the Principality of Reuss Junior Line. Besides these there were contingents of Fulda and Isenburg. These were recruited by the Austrians from German territories that were in the process of losing their independence by being annexed to other countries at the Congress of Vienna. Finally, these were joined by the contingents of the Kingdom of Saxony, Duchy of Saxe-Coburg-Saalfeld, Duchy of Saxe-Meiningen and the Duchy of Saxe-Hildburghausen. Its composition in June was:

Corps	Commander	Men	Battalions	Squadrons	Batteries
I Corps	Master General of the Ordnance, Hieronymus Karl Graf von Colloredo-Mansfeld	24,400	86	16	8
II Corps	General Prince Friedrich Hohenzollern-Hechingen	34,360	36	86	11
III Corps	Field Marshal William, Crown Prince of Württemberg	43,814	44	32	9
IV Corps (Bavarian Army)	Field Marshal Prince Karl Philipp von Wrede	67,040	46	66	16
Austrian Reserve Corps	Lieutenant Field Marshal Stutterheim	44,800	38	86	10
Blockade Corps		33,314	38	8	6
Saxon Corps		16,774	18	10	6
Totals		264,492 (Note: Although Siborne estimated the number at 264,492, David Chandler estimated the number 232,000 (Chandler 1981, p. 27))	246	844	66

==== Swiss Army ====
This army was composed entirely of Swiss. The Swiss General Niklaus Franz von Bachmann commanded this army. This force was to observe any French forces that operated near its borders. Its composition in July was:

- I Division – Colonel von Gady
- II Division – Colonel Fuessly
- III Division – Colonel d'Affry
- Reserve Division – Colonel-Quartermaster Finsler

Total 37,000

==== Austro-Sardinian Army (Army of Upper Italy) ====
This was the second largest of Austria's contingents. Its target was Lyon. General Johann Maria Philipp Frimont commanded this army. Its composition in June was:

- I Corps – Major-General(Feldmarschalleutnant) Paul von Radivojevich
- II Corps – Major-General (Feldmarschalleutnant) Ferdinand, Graf Bubna von Littitz
- Reserve Corps – Major-General (Feldmarschalleutnant) Franz Mauroy de Merville
- Sardinian Corps – Lieutenant-General Count Latour

Total 50,000

==== Austrian Army (Army of Naples) ====
This was the smallest of Austria's military contingents. Its targets were Marseille and Toulon. General Frederick Bianchi commanded this army. (Note: Chandler places the army under the command of General Onasco,(Chandler 1981, p. 30) but Plotho and Vaudoncourt name the commander as General Bianchi (Vaudoncourt 1826, Book I, Chapter I, p. 94.; Plotho 1818, Appendix pp. 76–77).) This was the Austrian army that defeated Joachim Murat's army in the Neapolitan War. It was not composed of Neapolitans as the army's name may suggest and as one author supposed. There was however a Sardinian force in this area forming the garrison of Nice under Giovanni Pietro Luigi Cacherano d'Osasco which may have been where the other part of this misunderstanding had arisen. Its composition in June was:

- I Corps – General Adam Albert von Neipperg
- II Corps – General Johann Friedrich von Mohr
- Reserve Corps – General Laval Nugent von Westmeath

Total 23,000

==== British Mediterranean contingent ====
This was Great Britain's smaller military expedition. It was composed of British troops from the garrison of Genoa under General Sir Hudson Lowe transported and supported by the Mediterranean Fleet of Lord Exmouth to Marseille to aid a French Royalist uprising. The British landed about 4,000 men in Marseille, made up of soldiers, marines and sailors.

=== Other mobilisations ===
==== Spanish armies ====
It was planned that a Spanish army was to invade France via Perpignan and Toulouse. General Francisco Javier Castanos, 1st Duke of Bailen commanded this army.

It was planned that a second Spanish army was to invade France over the river Bidassoa and into France via Bayonne and Bordeaux. General Henry Joseph O'Donnell, Count of La Bisbal commanded this army.

Both Wellington's Despatches and his Supplementary Despatches show that neither of the Spanish armies contained any Portuguese contingents nor were they likely too, (See the section Portuguese contingent below), however both Chandler and Barbero state that the Portuguese did send a contingent.

==== Netherlands reserve army ====
In order to support the Netherlands field army, plans had been made on 24 May to raise a reserve army. It wasn’t until 19 July until the organisation of the army was laid out: it was to consist of 30 infantry battalions, 18 cavalry squadrons, and four artillery batteries. The infantry was organised from the newly acquired Swiss regiments and newly raised Belgian Militia battalions; the cavalry from the reserves of all nine cavalry regiments, including the colonial hussars and Belgian Militia Carabiniers. By then, the Coalition armies had already set up camp around Paris. The army, existing largely only on paper, was disbanded after three months. Only the 43rd National Militia Infantry Battalion, part of the 4th Infantry Brigade (2nd Infantry Division), was deployed in the observation of Bouillon.

Commander: Lieutenant-General baron Ralph Dundas Tindal, Quartermaster / Adjudant-general: Major General D.L. Vermaesen:

- 1st Infantry Division, Lieutenant-general Baron Tindal
- 2nd Infantry Division, Lieutenant general Gijsbertus Martinus Cort Heyligers
- Cavalry Division, Lieutenant general Baron Evers (formed partially)

==== Prussian Reserve Army ====
Besides the four Army Corps that fought in the Waterloo Campaign listed above that Blücher took with him into the Kingdom of the Netherlands, Prussia also had a reserve army stationed at home in order to defend its borders.

This consisted of:

- V Army Corps – Commanded by General Ludwig Yorck von Wartenburg
- VI Army Corps – Commanded by General Bogislav Friedrich Emanuel von Tauentzien
- Royal Guard (VIII Corps) – Commanded by General Charles II, Grand Duke of Mecklenburg-Strelitz

==== Royal Danish Auxiliary Corps and Hanseatic Contingent ====
A Danish contingent known as the Royal Danish Auxiliary Corps commanded by General Prince Frederick of Hessen-Kassel and a Hanseatic contingent (from the free cities of Bremen, Lübeck and Hamburg) commanded by the British Colonel Sir Neil Campbell, were also on their way to join Wellington's army, both however, joined the army in July having missed the conflict.

==== Portuguese contingent ====
Wellington had very much hoped to obtain a Portuguese contingent of 12–14,000 men that might be boarded on ships and sent to this army. However, this contingent never materialised, as the Portuguese government were extremely uncooperative. They explained that they did not have the authority to send the Prince Regent of Portugal's forces to war without his consent (he was still in Brazil where he had been in exile during the Peninsular War and had yet to return to Portugal). They explained this even though they themselves had signed the Treaty of 15 March without his consent. Besides this, the state of the Portuguese Army in 1815 left much to be desired and it was a shadow of its former self with much of it being disbanded.

==== Russian 2nd (Reserve) Army ====
The Second Russian Army was behind the First Russian Army to support it if required.

- Imperial Guard Corps
- I Army Corps
- II Army Corps, commanded by General Wurttemberg
- I Grenadier Division
- I Reserve Cavalry Corps

==== Russian support for Wellington ====
The Tsar of Russia offered Wellington the II Army Corps under General Wurttemberg from his Reserve Army, but Wellington was far from keen on accepting this contingent.
