= Ministry of War (Prussia) =

Central administrative body for the former Royal Prussian Army

The Prussian Ministry of War was the highest state authority of the Royal Prussian Army and was responsible for the central administration of the army of the Kingdom of Prussia and, later, the Imperial German Army. (Note: The Kingdoms of Bavaria, Saxony and Württemberg retained their own War Ministries, with conventions between those states and Prussia to allocate responsibilities.) The ministry existed from 1808 through the establishment of the German Empire and was dissolved in 1919, being succeeded by the Ministry of the Reichswehr.

== Formation ==
The Prussian Ministry of War was gradually established between 1808 and 1809 as part of a series of reforms initiated by the Military Reorganization Commission created after the disastrous Treaties of Tilsit. The War Ministry was to help bring the Army under constitutional review, and, along with the General Staff, systematize the conduct of warfare. Gerhard von Scharnhorst, the most prominent and influential of the reformers, served as acting Minister of War from roughly 1808 until 1810 (he was also concurrently Chief of the General Staff).

The War Ministry was established on 25 December 1808, replacing the existing military institutions. The Ministry initially consisted of two departments. The first department was responsible for the command and condition of the army, the second for its financial administration.

At first, no Minister of War was appointed due to resistance from Frederick William III, the King of Prussia. Gerhard von Scharnhorst became head of the first department (the General War Department or Allgemeines Kriegsdepartement) and Lieutenant Colonel Graf Lottum became head of the second department. Scharnhorst also functioned as acting Minister of War, as long as no permanent appointment was made.

The first department initially consisted of three divisions. The first division represented the continuation of the old Prussian Adjutancy-General and was also known as the "Privy Military Cabinet" (Geheimes Kriegskabinett). It in turn had control over the General War Chancellery (Allgemeine Kriegskanzlei). The second division dealt with general army matters, including troop formation, replacements and turnover, accommodations, military exercises and mobilization. A third division was also created, the artillery and engineering department. This in turn comprised the artillery section, which dealt with artillery equipment, rifle production, cannon foundries, powder factories, etc., and the engineering section, which was primarily responsible for the maintenance of fortifications.

The second department, the military economy department (Militär-Ökonomie Departement), had four divisions. The first division was responsible for pay, the second for provisioning, the third for clothing and the fourth for invalids.

== Organization in 1914 ==
Over the years from its founding, the structure of the Ministry of War evolved. By 1914, the ministry had the following structure:

Central Department (Zentraldepartment) (ZD)

- 1. Ministerial Section (Ministerialabteilung) (Z 1)
  - Archives Administration (Archivverwaltung) (Av)
  - Library Administration (Büchereiverwaltung) (Bv)
  - Publications Administration (Druckvorschriftenverwaltung) (Dv)
- 2. Intendance Section (Intendanturabteilung) (Z 2)

Subordinated to the Central Department was the Examination Board for Higher Intendance Officials (Prüfungsausschuß für höhere Intendantur-Beamte)

General War Department (Allgemeines Kriegsdepartment) (AD)

- 1. Army Section (Armeeabteilung) (A 1)
- 2. Infantry Section (Infanterieabteilung) (A 2)
- 3. Cavalry Section (Kavallerieabteilung) (A 3)
- 4. Field Artillery Section (Feldartillerieabteilung) (A 4)
- 5. Foot Artillery Section (Fußartillerieabteilung) (A 5) (Note: "Foot Artillery" referred to heavy artillery.)
- 6. Engineer and Pionier Section (Ingenieur- und Pionierabteilung) (A 6)
- 7. Traffic Section (Verkehrsabteilung) (A 7)
- 8. Factory Section (Fabrikenabteilung) (A 8) (Note: The Fabrikenabteilung was newly formed in 1914, and was responsible for matters relating to the Inspectorate of the Infantry Technical Institutions and the Inspectorate of the Artillery Technical Institutions, as well as personnel matters for technical officers and officials.)
- 9. Section for Replacement Matters (Ersatzwesen-Abteilung) (A 9)

Subordinated to the General War Department:

- Inspectorate of Machine Gun Matters (Inspektion des Maschinengewehrwesens)
- Inspectorate of Infantry Schools (Inspektion der Infanterieschulen) (subordinated to the Inspectorate were the Infantry Marksmanship School in Wünsdorf, the Military Gymnastics Institute in Berlin, the NCO Schools and NCO Preparatory Schools, and the Military Boys Education Institute in Annaburg)
- Rifle Examination Commission (Gewehr-Prüfungskommission) in Spandau-Ruhleben
- Artillery Examination Commission (Artillerie-Prüfungskommission)
- Transport Examination Commission (Verkehrstechnische Prüfungskommission)
- Arsenal Administration (Zeughaus-Verwaltung) (Note: Responsible for the administration of the Zeughaus in Berlin and its collection of weapons, flags and war trophies.)
- Military Veterinary Inspectorate (Militär-Veterinär-Inspektion)
- Military Veterinary Academy (Militär-Veterinär-Akademie)
- Army Music Leaders (Armee Musikinspizienten)

Subordinated to the General War Department for administrative matters:

- Military Riding Institute (Militär-Reitinstitut) in Hannover
  - Officer's Riding School (Offizier-Reitschule) in Paderborn
  - Officer's Riding School (Offizier-Reitschule) in Soltau
  - Cavalry NCO's School (Kavallerieunteroffizierschule)
- Ordnance Department (Feldzeugmeisterei)
  - Central Section (Zentralabteilung)
  - Inspectorate of the Infantry Technical Institutions (Inspektion der Technischen Institute der Infanterie) (including the infantry construction bureau, the rifle factories in Danzig, Erfurt and Spandau, and the munitions factory in Spandau)
  - Inspectorate of the Artillery Technical Institutions (Inspektion der Technischen Institute der Artillerie) (including the artillery construction bureau, the artillery workshops in Danzig, Lippstadt, Spandau and Straßburg i.E., the cannon foundry in Spandau, the shell factory in Siegburg, the artificer laboratories in Siegburg and Spandau, and the powder factories in Hanau and Spandau)
  - Artillery Depot Inspectorate (Artilleriedepotinspektion)
  - Supply Depot Inspectorate (Traindepotinspektion)
  - Military Research Office (Militärversuchsamt)

Personnel Section (Abteilung für die persönlichen Angelegenheiten)

- Privy War Council (Geheime Kriegs-Kanzlei) (GKK)

Army Administrative Department (Armee-Verwaltungsdepartment) (BD)

- 1. Pay Section (Kassenabteilung) (B 1)
- 2. Provisions Section (Verpflegungsabteilung) (B 2)
- 3. Clothing Section (Bekleidungsabteilung) (B 3)
- 4. Accommodations Section (Unterkunftsabteilung) (B 4)
- 5. Exercise Areas Section (Übungsplatzabteilung) (B 5)
- 6. Construction Section (Bauabteilung) (B 6)

Subordinated to the Army Administrative Department:

- General Military Treasury (General-Militärkasse)
- Inspectorate of Military Arrest Facilities (Inspektion der militärischen Strafanstalten)

Logistics and Justice Department (Versorgungs- und Justizdepartment) (CD)

- 1. Pension Section (Pensionsabteilung) (C 1)
- 2. Logistics Section (Versorgungsabteilung) (C 2)
- 3. Justice Section (Justizabteilung) (C 3)
  - Legal Advisors to the War Ministry (Justitiare des Kriegsministeriums)

Subordinated to the Logistics and Justice Department was the Directorate of the Potsdam Grand Military Orphanage (Direktorium des Potsdamschen Großen Militär-Waisenhauses)

Remount Inspectorate (Remonte-Inspektion) (RJ)

Subordinated to the Remount Inspectorate:

- Remount Commissions (Remontekommissionen)
- Remount Depots (Remontedepots)

Medical Section (Medizinalabteilung) (MA)

Subordinated to the Medical Section:

- Medical Inspectorates (Sanitätsinspektionen)
- Kaiser Wilhelm Academy for Military Medical Education (Kaiser-Wilhelms-Akademie für das militärärztliche Bildungswesen)
- Medical Office of the Military Institutions (Sanitätsamt der militärischen Institute)
- Convalescent homes for German officers and medical officers (Genesungsheime für deutsche Offiziere und Sanitätsoffiziere)
  - Villa Hildebrand (Arco in South Tyrol)
  - Offiziersheim Taunus (Falkenstein (Taunus))

Adjudication Council for Retirement Issues (Kollegium zur Entscheidung von Pensionierungsfragen)

Also under the purview of the War Ministry were:

- Protestant and Catholic Field Chaplaincy (Evangelische und katholische Feldpropstei)
- War Academy (for pay and administrative matters; academic and scientific matters were under the purview of the Great General Staff and legal matters under the military governor of Berlin)
- General Inspectorate for Military Training and Education Matters (Generalinspektion des Militär-Erziehungs- und bildungswesens)
  - Military Technical Academy (Militärtechnische Akademie)
  - Higher Military Examination Commission (Obermilitärprüfungskommission)
  - War Schools (Kriegsschulen)
  - Committee for the Admission of Boys into the Royal Cadet Corps (Ausschuß für die Aufnahme von Knaben in das Königliche Kadettenkorps)
  - Cadet Corps (Kadettenkorps)
- Field Artillery Marksmanship School (Feldartillerieschießschule) in Jüterbog
- Foot Artillery Marksmanship School (Fußartillerieschießschule) in Jüterbog
- Engineering Committee (Ingenieurkomitee), including the Fortress Construction School in Charlottenburg
- General Inspectorate of Military Traffic Matters (Generalinspektion des Militärverkehrswesens)
  - Inspectorate of Railway Troops (Inspektion der Eisenbahntruppen)
  - Inspectorate of Field Telegraphy (Inspektion der Feldtelegraphie)
  - Inspectorate of Military Aircraft and Vehicles (Inspektion des Militär-Luft- und Kraftfahrwesens)
    - Inspectorate of Airship Troops (Inspektion der Luftschiffertruppen)
    - Inspectorate of Flying Troops (Inspektion der Fliegertruppen)
    - Research Detachment for Military Traffic Matters (Versuchsabteilung des Militärverkehrswesens)
    - Inspectorate of Fortress Traffic (Inspektion des Festungsverkehrswesens)
- Invalids Institutions (Invalideninstitute)
- Life Insurance Institute for the Army and Navy (Lebensversicherungsanstalt für die Armee und Marine)
- Landgendarmerie

== Wartime reorganization ==
After the mobilization for World War I, the Ministry of War was reorganized with the following structure:

A. Minister of War with mobile staff in the Supreme Headquarters

B. Deputy Minister of War in Berlin

1. Central Department (ZD)

- Ministerial Section (Z 1)
- Budget Section (Etats-Abteilung) (Z 2)
- Central Certification Bureau (Zentrale-Nachweise-Bureau) (NB)

2. Army Section (A 1), to which the Replacement Section (C 1) is attached

3. General War Department (AD)

- Infantry Section (A 2)
- Cavalry Section (A 3)
- Field Artillery Section (A 4)
- Foot Artillery Section (A 5)
- Engineer and Pioneer Section (A 6)
- Traffic Section (A 7 V)
- Aviation Section (A 7 L)
- Factories Section (B 5)
- Central Office for War Booty (Zentralstelle für Kriegsbeute) (ZK)

4. War Provisioning Section (Kriegsverpflegungs-Abteilung) (B 1)

5. Peace Provisioning Section (Friedensverpflegungs-Abteilung) (B 2)

6. Accommodations Department (UD)

- Accommodations Section (East and West, U 1 and U 2)
- Exercise Area Section (U 3)
- Accommodations War Section (Unterkunfts-Kriegs-Abteilung) (UK)
- Construction Section (U 4)
- Clothing Section (B 3)
- Pay Section (B 4)

7. Logistics and Justice Department (CD)

- Pension Section (C 2)
- Logistics Section (C 3)
- Justice Section (C 4)

8. Remount Inspectorate (RJ)

9. Medical Section (MA)

10. War Raw Materials Section (Kriegs-Rohstoff-Abteilung) (KRA)

Over the course of the war, further reorganizations would take place, most importantly with regard to the organization of the war economy. Among the most significant was the establishment of the War Office (Kriegsamt) and the Weapons and Ammunition Procurement Office.

== Prussian Ministers of War, 1808–1919 ==
Scharnhorst was succeeded by General der Infanterie Karl von Hake, who served as minister from 1810 to 1813 and from 1819 to 1833. Hermann von Boyen, another prominent reformer alongside Scharnhorst, served as minister from 1813 to 1819 and again from 1841-to 1847 and was promoted to Generalfeldmarschall in 1847.

Among other long-serving ministers was Albrecht Graf von Roon, who served as minister from 1859 to 1873, during the Second Schleswig War (1864), the Austro-Prussian War (1866) and the Franco-Prussian War (1870–71) and was promoted to Generalfeldmarschall in 1873. General der Infanterie Georg von Kameke succeeded Graf von Roon and served from 1873 to 1883.

Karl von Einem would serve as minister from 1903 to 1909 and would be recalled in World War I, commanding the 3rd Army from 1914 to 1918. Erich von Falkenhayn was named Minister of War on 7 June 1913 and held the office during the opening stages of World War I. He would succeed Helmuth von Moltke the Younger as Chief of the General Staff from 14 September 1914 to 29 August 1916. Falkenhayn was briefly concurrently minister and chief of the general staff until 21 January 1915, when Adolf Wild von Hohenborn succeeded him as minister. Wild von Hohenborn was dismissed on 29 October 1916 and replaced by Hermann von Stein, who held the office until shortly before the end of the war. Stein was succeeded on 9 October 1918 by Heinrich Schëuch, though by that point much of the ministry's responsibilities had been assumed by the higher military staff under Paul von Hindenburg and Erich Ludendorff. Walther Reinhardt would serve as the last Prussian Minister of War in 1919.

== Locations ==
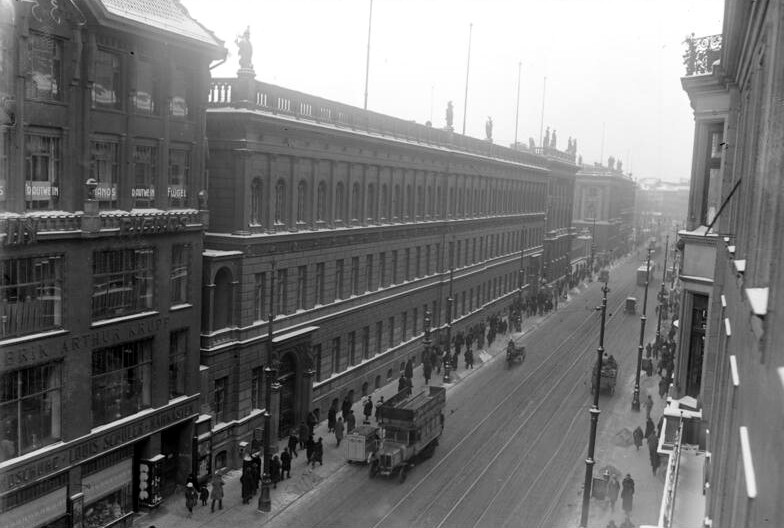
Ministry building on Leipziger Straße

For one hundred years, from 1 January 1819 to 1 January 1919 (when the ministry ceased to exist), it was located in the Friedrichstadt quarter of what is today Berlin-Mitte:

The main building was on Leipziger Straße 5 facing south, with the garden bordering on the Prinz-Albrecht-Palais (demolished in 1935 to erect the Ministry of Aviation building). Additional offices were later established in other parts of Berlin.

- Wilhelmstrasse 81 - used from 1824.
- Behrenstraße 66 - used by the General Staff after approximately 1820, transferred to the War Ministry from 1871. From 1900 it was used by the Military Cabinet. The building is now the rear part of offices belonging to the Russian Embassy.
- Hinter dem Gießhaus 2 (behind the Zeughaus) - used by the Military Cabinet from 1820 to 1900.

A new building was built for the General Staff between 1867 and 1871 in the Tiergarten at the Königsplatz (now the Platz der Republik), with its western corner facing the Moltkestraße.

== Bibliography ==
- Curt Jany: Geschichte der preußischen Armee – vom 15. Jahrhundert bis 1914, Biblio-Verlag, Osnabrück 1967.
