= Josef Freiherrn Bogdan von Sturmbruck =

Austrian soldier

Joseph Freiherr Bogdan von Sturmbruck (19 September 1769, in Egervár – 14 May 1827, in Galicia) was an Austrian Lieutenant Field Marshal who fought for Austria in the French Revolutionary and Napoleonic wars.

== Biography ==
Born in Egervár, Hungary, Habsburg monarchy, Bogdan's social status was elevated in 1802 to Freiherr with the predicate "von Sturmbruck".

Bogdan was born in 1768 in Egervár (Hungary). He entered the cuirassiers of Schakmin (later the 6th Dragoon Regiment) of the Austrian Army as a gentleman volunteer cadet on 8 June 1786. Two years later he was promoted to corporal 1 June 1788, standard bearer on November 16 of the same year, and a year later to Maréchal des logis-chef (equivalent to sergent-chef) on 4 June 1789.

Bogdan was commissioned as a lieutenant by the Aulic Council of the war on 16 March 1790 and was posted to the Uhlan Free Corps of Joseph Freiherr von Motschlitz (later 2nd Uhlan Regiment). While serving in this regiment, he fought in the campaign of 1793—1794.

By 1799 Bogdan was a captain-commander of the same regiment, which was part of the corps that the Archduke Charles detached under the orders of Field Marshal-Lieutenant Prince of Schwarzenberg in Mannheim to observe the Rhine. Captain Bogdan distinguished himself in the defence of the Heidelberg Bridge and for this feat of arms received the Knight's Cross of the Order of Maria Theresa and a little later the title of Freiherr von Sturmbruck( baron of Sturmbrück).

Bogdan was commissioned Major to the 1st Uhlans (Uhlans of Merveldt) on 18 November 1800, lieutenant-colonel in this regiment on 6 June 1804. His regiment served in the campaign of 1805 as part of Kienmayer's light division. He was promoted to colonel on 4 April 1807, and to general-major on 22 July 1809 after the Battle of Essling.

During 1814 in the Austrian army in Italy, he commanded a brigade at the Battle of the Mincio River. In 1815 Bogdan was assigned to command one of the brigades of Crenneville Division, of the I Corps of the Austo-German Army of the Upper Rhine. On 3 July General Bogdan, with the advanced guard of the Austrian I Corps, having been reinforced by Lieutenant Field Marshal Radivojevich, attacked the French at Oyonnax, beyond St. Claude, where the French General Maransin had taken up a favourable position with a force of 2,000 men. The Austrians turned Maransin's left flank, and forced the French to retire. The I Corps reached Bourg-en-Bresse on 9 July.

Bogdan was promoted Field-Marshal-Lieutenant 12 January 1823, and called to command of the Lemberg division. Bogdan died in Lemberg, Galicia, then part of Ruthenia, formerly part of Polish Kingdom (now in Lviv in Western Ukraine), on May 44, 1827

== Family ==
He was married to Aloysia Sophia Charlotte van Greiffenclau-Vollrads on 13 July 1804 but the marriage didn't last long. On 13 February 1809, he married Elizabeth von Thure-Hokonstein-Choltitz with whom they had two children: Ferdinant Johan-Nepomuk Bogdan (1810–1827) and Theresa Bogdan von Sturmbruck (1816–1860).
