= Louis Auguste François Mariage =

Major-General Louis Auguste François Mariage (French pronunciation: [lwi oɡyst fʁɑ̃swa maʁjaʒ]; 1767–1827), Baron of the Empire, Grand Officer of the Legion Honour and Commander of the order of St. Louis, was a French officer during the Napoleonic Wars. (Note: Also Louis Auguste François Mériage)

== Biography ==
Mariage was born in Valogenes on 8 July 1767. He entered the French army as a private before the French Revolution. During the Revolution he distinguished himself in several campaigns and worked his way up through the ranks. He was appointed a colonel and sent on a mission to Turkey where he showed ability. He was promoted to Maréchal de camp (major-general) on 18 October 1812. He was wounded at the Battle of Krasnoi during the retreat from Moscow and was captured by the Russians. He returned to France after the first restoration of Louis XVIII in 1814. During Napoleon's Hundred Days, he commanded National Guard of the three military division. Forces under his command were decisively defeated when Saarbrücken was stormed by an Austrian column under the command of Lieutenant-General Count Beckers.

He served in the Royalist army in 1823 as an advisor with the army of the Pyrenees before retiring as a Major-General to Paris, where he died on 8 December 1827.
