= Hermann von Boyen =

Prussian army officer

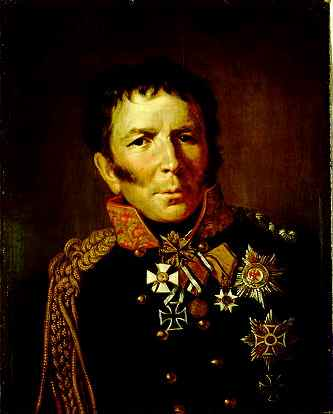
- Born: Leopold Hermann Ludwig von Boyen; 23 June 1771; Kreuzburg, East Prussia, Prussia
- Died: 15 February 1848 (aged 76); Berlin, Prussia
- Occupations: Army officer, politician

Leopold Hermann Ludwig von Boyen (23 June 1771 – 15 February 1848) was a Prussian army officer who helped to reform the Prussian Army in the early 19th century. He also served as minister of war of Prussia in the period 1810–1813 and again from 1 March 1841 – 6 October 1847.

== Life ==
Born in Kreuzburg (today's Slavskoye, Russia) in East Prussia, Boyen joined the army in 1784 in Königsberg. In 1788, as a newly minted second lieutenant, he took up a post in the military academy in Königsberg, where he also attended some of the lectures of Immanuel Kant.

From 1794 to 1796, Boyen took part in the Polish campaign as Adjutant to General von Günther. In 1799, he became a captain. He served in the war of 1806 on the General Staff of the Duke of Brunswick, and was wounded at the Battle of Auerstädt (14 October 1806). After the Treaty of Tilsit (July 1807) he became a major and a member of Gerhard von Scharnhorst's commission for military re-organisation.

By 1810 Boyen had become Director of the Military Cabinet. In the re-constitution of the Prussian army he functioned as Scharnhorst's most diligent helper, but after the conclusion of the alliance between Prussia and France in 1812 he resigned his commission as a colonel and visited Vienna and St Petersburg. The events of 1813 saw him recalled to the Prussian service: as a colonel he accompanied the Russian army from its base in Kalisz to Saxony. After the Battle of Lützen (2 May 1813) he had charge of the border guards and ultimately the defence of Berlin. But during the truce King Frederick William III named him Chief of General Staff of the 3rd Army Corps. As such, Boyen participated in the battles and skirmishes of 1813 and 1814 and gained promotion to major-general.

After the first Peace of Paris (30 May 1814) Boyen took up his appointment as War Minister. He completed the setting up of the Landwehr reserve (begun during the war) and in 1818 became a lieutenant general. He struggled in vain against growing reactionary forces which endangered the broad popular base of the Landwehr, and resigned in 1819.

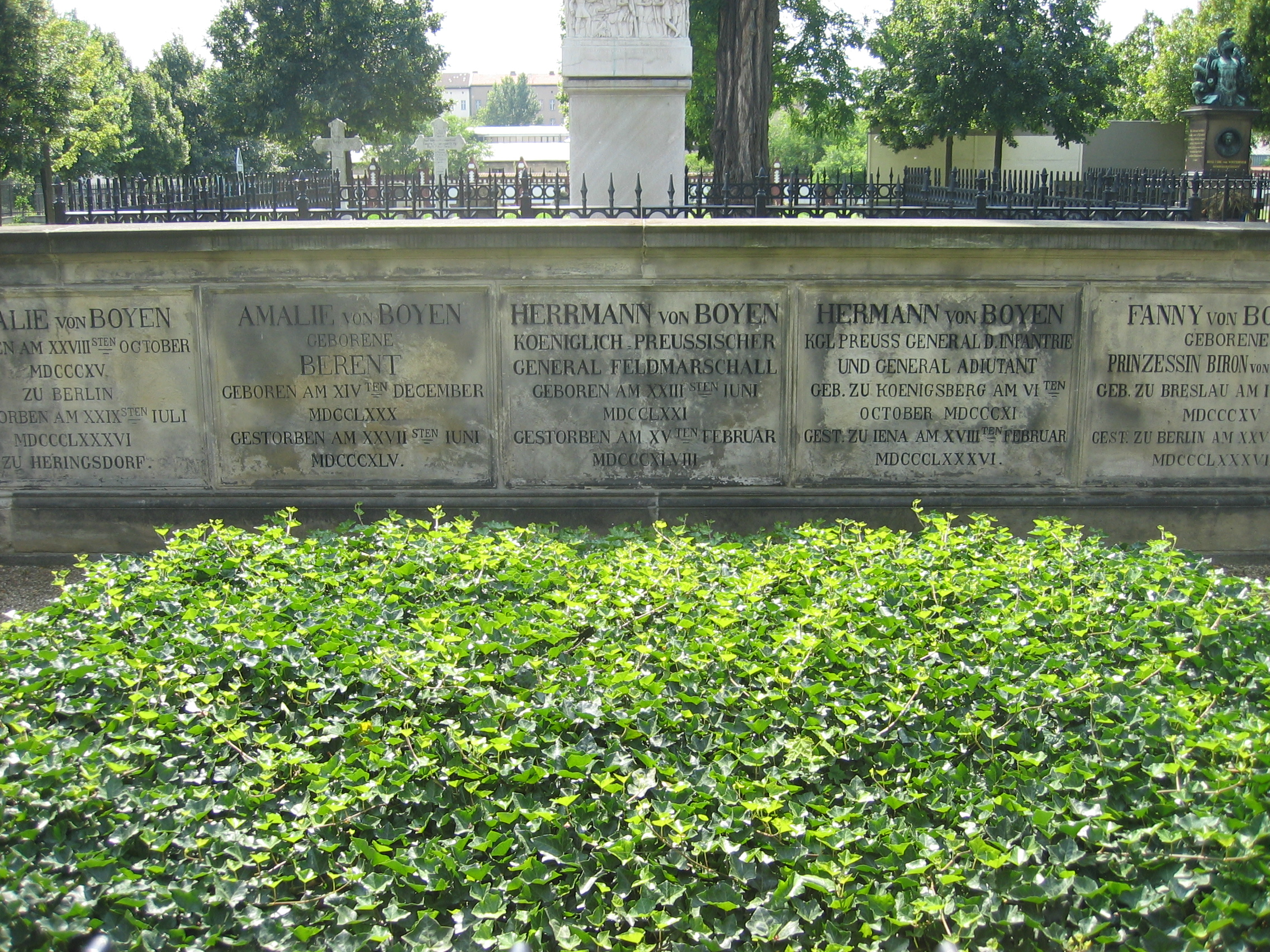
The tomb of Boyen at the Invalidenfriedhof in Berlin

For 21 years Boyen lived in retirement, occupying himself with historical studies, until King Frederick William IV, immediately after ascending the throne, recalled him to active service, and promoted him to general of the infantry. In March 1841 he once again took over the War Ministry, though without achieving a great influence in the general political situation. He resigned in November 1847, received the rank of field marshal, and died on 15 February 1848. The King named the fortress of Lötzen in East Prussia after him.

Boyen's son, also named Hermann von Boyen, was General Adjutant to the King. He retired a governor of Berlin in 1879. Hermann von Boyen was buried at the Invalidenfriedhof Cemetery in Berlin. The former football club Yorck Boyen Insterburg was named in honor of Boyen.

== Works ==
Hermann von Boyen wrote (among other works):

- Beiträge zur Kenntnis des Generals v. Scharnhorst (1833)
- Erinnerungen aus dem Leben des Generalleutnants v. Günther (1834).
- Vorwärts!: ein Husaren-Tagebuch und Feldzugsbriefe von Gebhardt Leberecht von Blücher etc. (1914, diary during his period under the Hussars)
- Gesammelte Schriften und Briefe / Blücher, Yorck, Gneisenau; zusammengestellt und hrsg. von Edmund Th. Kauer (1932, letters, including those to Yorck and Gneisenau)
- Kampagne-Journal der Jahre 1793 und 1794 (1796, campaign journal)

He also wrote the song "Der Preußen Losung" (1838).

Political offices
Preceded by Karl von Hake	Prussian Minister of War; 1810–1813	Succeeded by Karl von Hake
Preceded by Gustav von Rauch	Prussian Minister of War; 1841–1847	Succeeded by Ferdinand von Rohr
