= Gerhard von Scharnhorst =

Prussian general (1755–1813)

Generalleutnant Gerhard von Scharnhorst
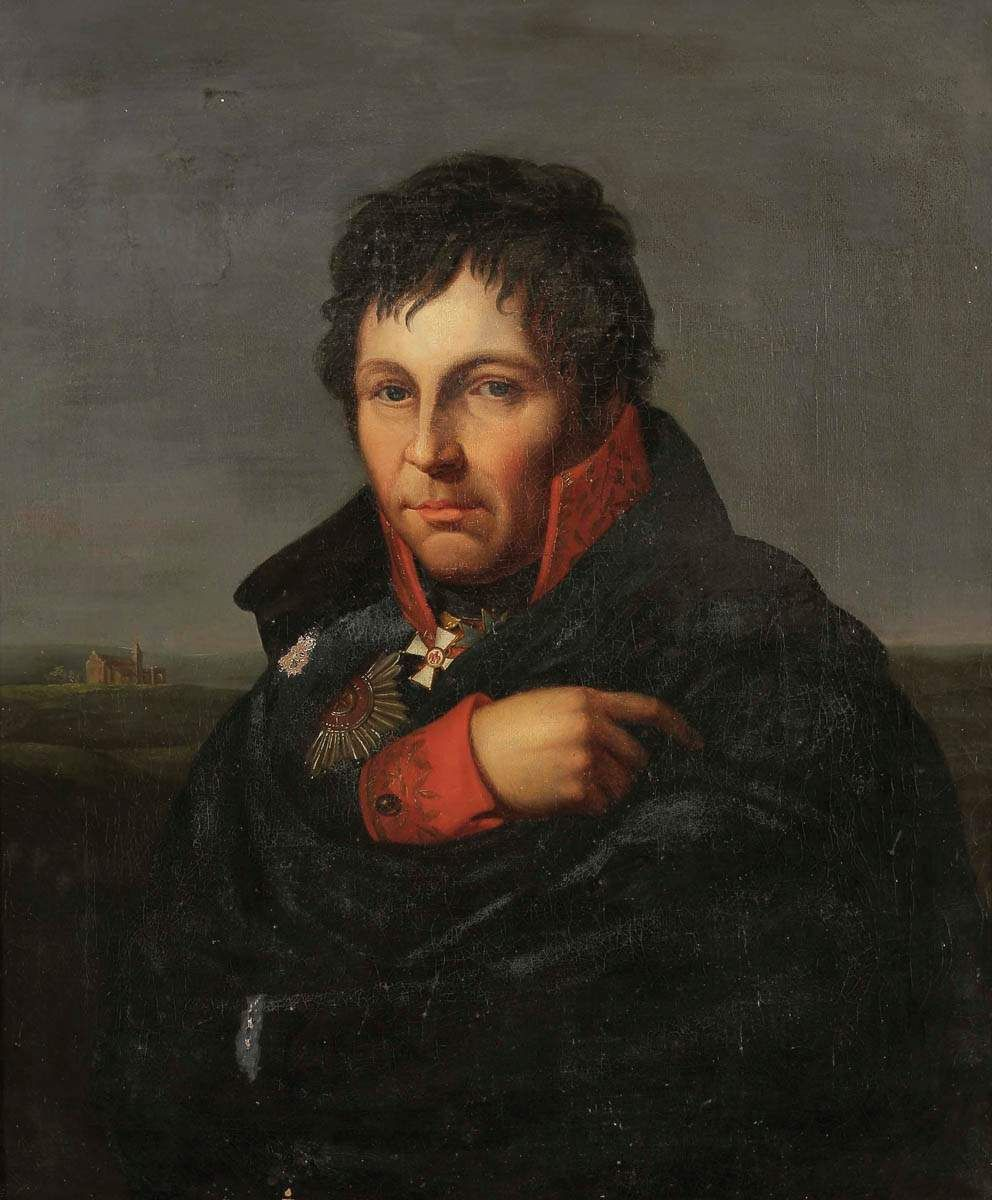
- Portrait by Friedrich Bury, c. 1810s

Prussian Minister of War
- In office 1 March 1808 – 17 June 1810
- Preceded by: Position Established
- Succeeded by: Karl von Hake

Chief of the Prussian General Staff
- In office 1 March 1808 – 17 June 1810
- Preceded by: Position Established
- Succeeded by: Karl von Hake
- In office March 1813 – 28 June 1813
- Preceded by: Gustav von Rauch
- Succeeded by: August von Gneisenau

Personal details
- Born: Gerhard Johann David von Scharnhorst; 12 November 1755 Bordenau, Electorate of Hanover, Holy Roman Empire
- Died: 28 June 1813 (aged 57) Prague, Kingdom of Bohemia, Austrian Empire
- Resting place: Invalidenfriedhof
- Awards: Pour le Mérite

Military service
- Allegiance: Electorate of Hanover(1778-1801) (Kingdom of Prussia) Prussia(1801-1813)
- Branch/service: (Electorate of Brunswick-Lüneburg) Hanoverian Army(1778-1801); Prussian Army(1801-1813)
- Years of service: 1778–1813
- Rank: Generalleutnant
- Battles/wars: French Revolutionary Wars; War of the First Coalition; Battle of Menin (1793); Napoleonic Wars; War of the Fourth Coalition; Battle of Jena–Auerstedt; Battle of Lübeck; Battle of Eylau; War of the Sixth Coalition; Battle of Lützen (DOW)

Gerhard Johann David von Scharnhorst (12 November 1755 – 28 June 1813) was a Hanoverian-born general in Prussian service from 1801. As the first Chief of the Prussian General Staff, he was noted for his military theories, his reforms of the Prussian army, and his leadership during the Napoleonic Wars. Scharnhorst limited the use of corporal punishments, established promotion for merit, abolished the enrollment of foreigners, began the organization of a reserve army, and organized and simplified the military administration.

== Life and career ==
Born at Bordenau (now a part of Neustadt am Rübenberge, Lower Saxony) near Hanover, into a minor landowning family, Scharnhorst succeeded in educating himself and in securing admission to the military academy of William, Count of Schaumburg-Lippe, at the Wilhelmstein fortress. In 1778 he received a commission into the Hanoverian service. He employed the intervals of regimental duty in further self-education and literary work. In 1783 he transferred to the artillery and received an appointment to the new artillery school in Hanover. He had already founded a military journal which, under a series of names, endured until 1805, and in 1788 he designed, and in part published, a Handbook for Officers in the Applied Sections of Military Science (Handbuch für Offiziere in den anwendbaren Teilen der Kriegswissenschaften). He also published in 1792 his Military Handbook for Use in the Field (Militärisches Taschenbuch für den Gebrauch im Felde).

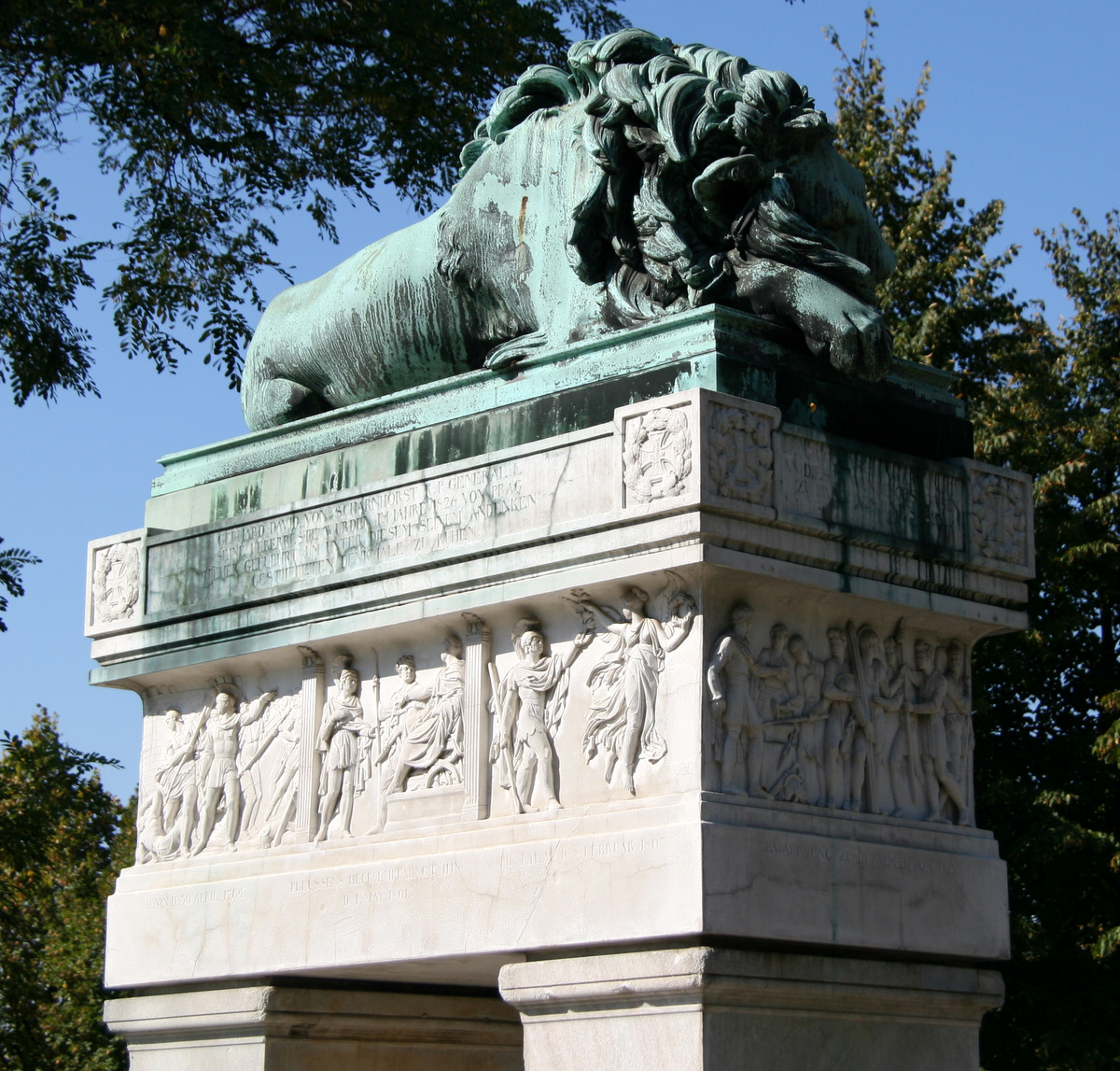
Scharnhorst's grave at the Invalidenfriedhof, Berlin

The income he derived from his writings provided Scharnhorst's chief means of support, for he still held the rank of lieutenant, and though the farm of Bordenau produced a small sum annually, he had a wife, Clara Schmalz (a sister of Theodor Schmalz, the first director of Berlin University) and family to maintain.

His first military campaign took place in 1793 in the Netherlands, in which he served with distinction under the Duke of York. In that year, he took part in the defence of Menen and commemorated the escape of the garrison in his Defence of the Town of Menen (Verteidigung der Stadt Menin, Hanover, 1803), which, apart from his paper on "The Origins of the Good Fortune of the French in the Revolutionary War" (Die Ursachen des Glücks der Franzosen im Revolutionskrieg) remains his best-known work. Shortly thereafter he received promotion to the rank of major and joined the staff of the Hanoverian contingent.

After the Peace of Basel (5 March 1795) Scharnhorst returned to Hanover. He had by now become so well known to the armies of the various allied states that he received invitations from several of them to transfer his services. In January 1797, he turned down an invitation to join the Prussian Army when Hanover offered a promotion to lieutenant colonel and a raise in pay. In 1801 the Prussian offer was made again, at twice his pay from Hanover, and this time Scharnhorst accepted, on the condition that he retain his seniority, was provided with a good pension, and received a patent of nobility. He thus engaged himself to King Frederick William III of Prussia.

The Prussian Military Academy employed him, almost as a matter of course, in important instructional work (Clausewitz was one of his students) and he founded the Berlin Military Society. In the mobilizations and precautionary measures that marked the years 1804 and 1805, and in the war of 1806 that ensued, Scharnhorst served as chief of the general staff (lieutenant-quartermaster) of the Duke of Brunswick, received a slight wound at Auerstedt (14 October 1806) and distinguished himself by his stern resolution during the retreat of the Prussian army. He attached himself to Blücher in the last stages of the disastrous campaign, went into captivity with him at the capitulation of Ratekau (7 November 1806), and, quickly exchanged, had a prominent and almost decisive part in leading L'Estocq's Prussian corps, which served with the Russians. For his services at Eylau (February 1807) he received the highest Prussian military order Pour le Mérite.

It was apparent that Scharnhorst's skills exceeded those of a merely brilliant staff officer. Educated in the traditions of the Seven Years' War, he had by degrees, as his experience widened, divested his mind of antiquated forms of war, and realised that only a "national" army and a policy of fighting decisive battles could give an adequate response to the political and strategic situation brought about by the French Revolution. He was promoted to major-general a few days after the Peace of Tilsit (July 1807), and became the head of a reform commission that included the best of the younger officers, such as Gneisenau, Grolman, and Boyen. Stein himself became a member of the commission and secured Scharnhorst free access to King Frederick William III by securing his appointment as aide-de-camp-general. But Napoleon quickly became suspicious, and Frederick William repeatedly had to suspend or cancel the reforms recommended.

By slow and labored steps, Scharnhorst converted the professional long-service army of Prussia, wrecked at Jena (1806), into a national army based on universal service. Universal service was not secured until his death, but he laid down the principles and prepared the way for its adoption. Enrollments of foreigners were abolished, corporal punishments were limited to flagrant cases of insubordination, promotion for merit was established, and the military administration organized and simplified. The organization of the Landwehr (army reserves) was begun.

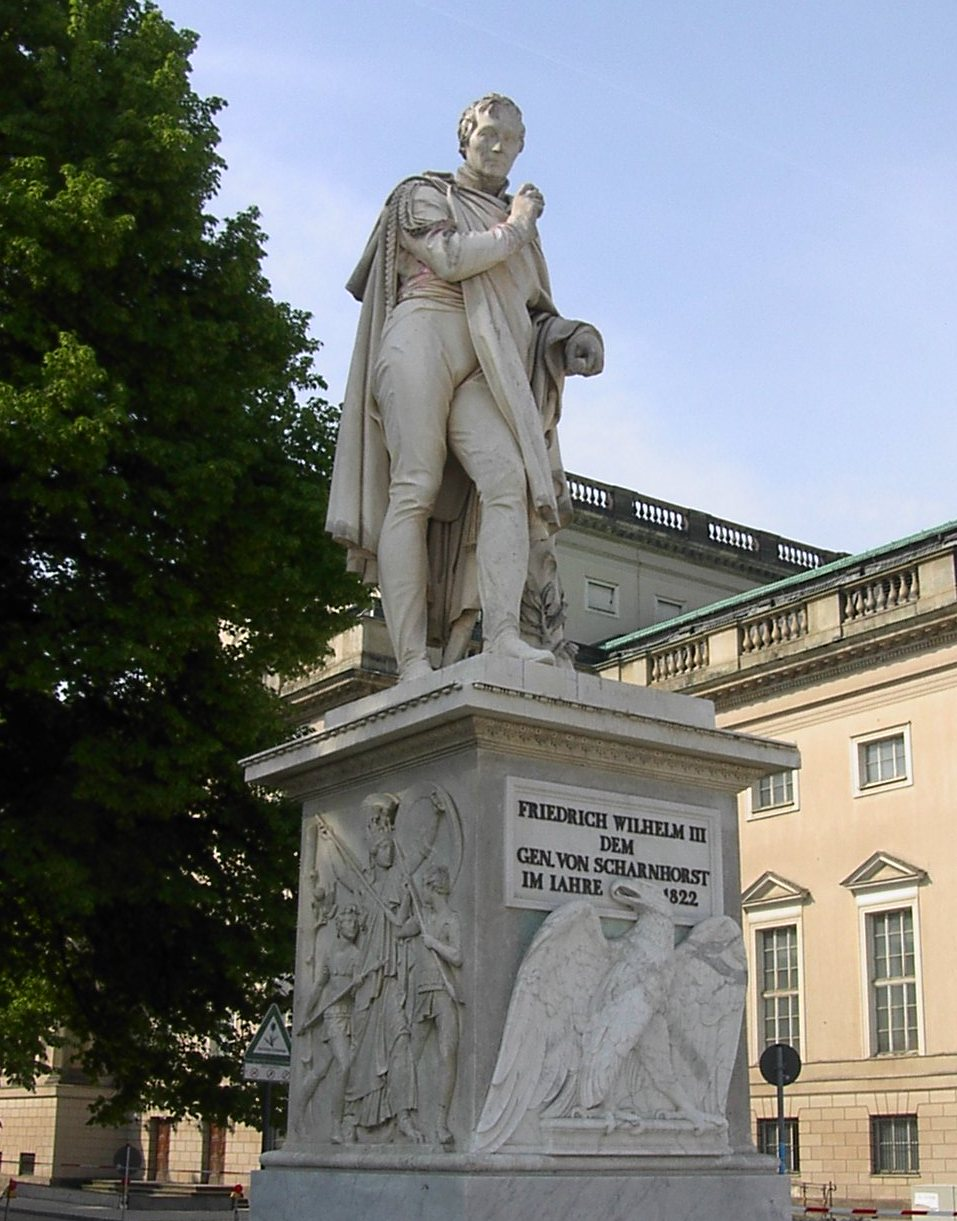
Statue of Scharnhorst on the Unter den Linden, Berlin

In 1809, the war between France and Austria roused premature hopes in the patriots' party, which the conqueror did not fail to note. By direct application to Napoleon, Scharnhorst evaded the decree of 26 September 1810, which required all foreigners to leave the Prussian service forthwith, but when in 1811–1812 France forced Prussia into an alliance against Russia and Prussia despatched an auxiliary army to serve under Napoleon's orders, Scharnhorst left Berlin on unlimited leave of absence. In retirement he wrote and published a work on firearms, Über die Wirkung des Feuergewehrs (1813). But the retreat from Moscow (1812) at last sounded the call to arms for the new national army of Prussia.

Scharnhorst, recalled to the king's headquarters, refused a higher post but became chief of staff to Blücher, in whose vigour, energy, and influence with the young soldiers he had complete confidence. Russian Prince Wittgenstein was so impressed by Scharnhorst that he asked to borrow him temporarily as his chief of staff, and Blücher agreed. In the first battle, Lützen or Gross-Görschen (2 May 1813), Prussia suffered defeat, but a very different defeat from those Napoleon had inflicted before. The French army, largely made up of teenage conscripts by 1813 and no longer the juggernaut military it once was in before 1807, suffered significant casualties and, due in part to a severe shortage of cavalry, failed to follow up, rendering it an incomplete victory. In this battle, Scharnhorst received a wound in the foot, not in itself grave, but soon made mortal by the fatigues of the retreat to Dresden, and he succumbed to it on 28 June 1813 at Prague, where he had travelled to negotiate with Schwarzenberg and Radetzky for the armed intervention of Austria. Shortly before his death he had received promotion to the rank of lieutenant-general. Frederick William III erected a statue in his memory, by Christian Daniel Rauch, in Berlin. Scharnhorst was buried at the Invalidenfriedhof Cemetery in Berlin.

== Legacy ==
Scharnhorst became the namesake for several objects, places and groups:

- SMS Scharnhorst, a 1906 German armored cruiser during World War I.
- Scharnhorst, a 1936 German battleship during World War II and lead ship of the Scharnhorst class, which also included the Gneisenau.
- Infantry Division Scharnhorst, a 1945 German infantry division and one of the last new Wehrmacht formations of World War II.
- Scharnhorst Order, highest military order of the former East German National People's Army (NVA).
- Scharnhorst (F 213), a 1943 British sloop, initially known as HMS Mermaid, transferred to West Germany in 1959.
- Many streets in German cities, including Berlin, Hamburg, Munich, and Cologne, among others.

General Hans von Seeckt has been compared to Scharnhorst, mainly for his part in preparing the German Army of the Weimar Republic, which was severely limited by the Treaty of Versailles, for its eventual rearming, adapting secret doctrines, and preparing a General Staff. He has been credited with their unparalleled success in the campaigns of 1939-1940. After the rise of the Nazis in Germany, Field Marshal August von Mackensen compared von Seeckt to Scharnhorst, saying "The old fire burnt still, and the Allied Control had not destroyed any of the lasting elements of German strength." Winston Churchill also subscribed to this theory, believing von Seeckt was vital in the return of Germany to its place in the military world as rapidly as it had.

== See also ==
- German General Staff

Political offices
| Preceded by New ministry | Chief of the Prussian General Staff; Prussian Minister of War; 1808–1810 | Succeeded by Karl von Hake |
