= Lines of Weissenburg =

Coordinates: 48.99674°N 8.07196°E

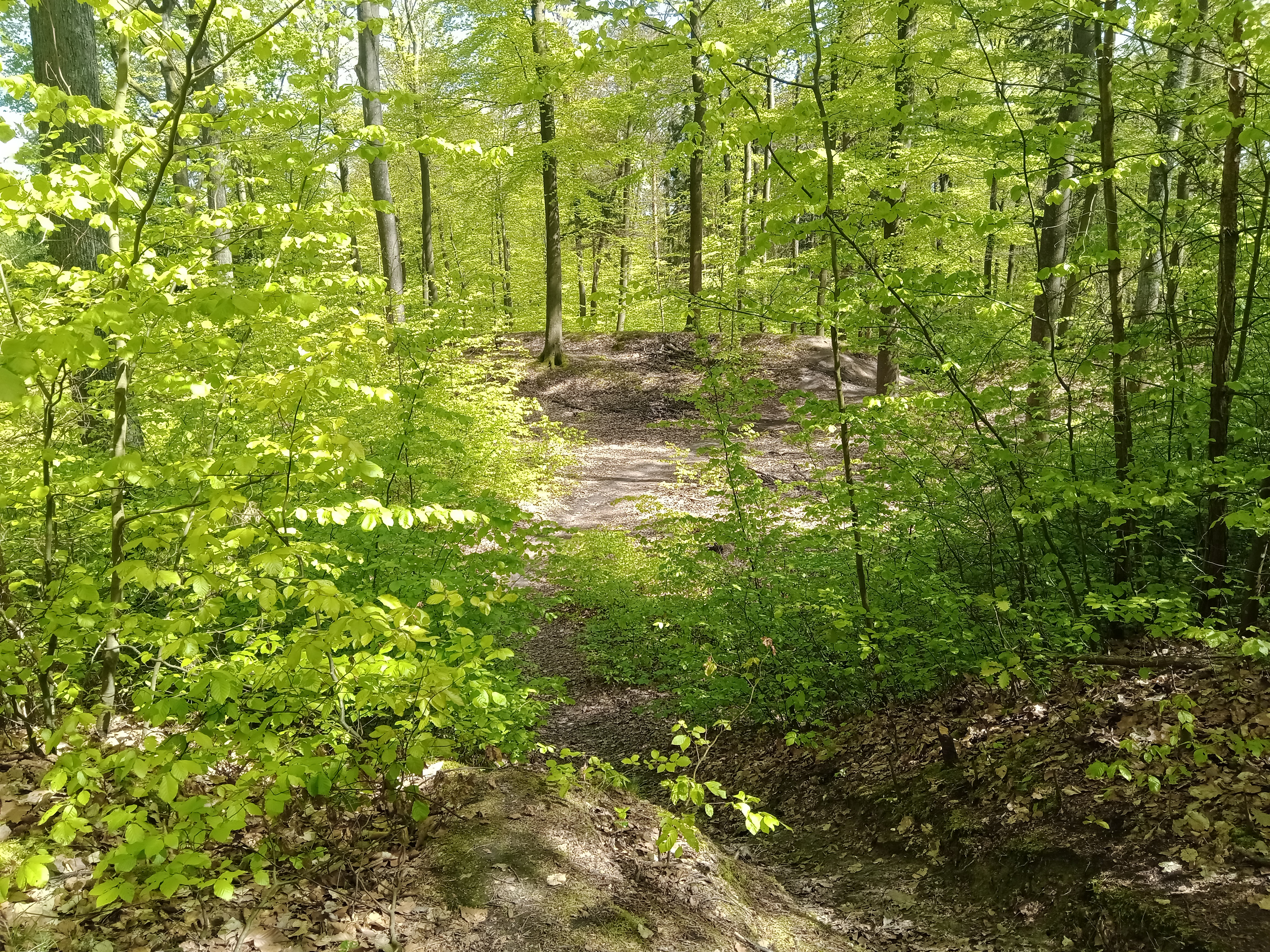
Maréchal du Bourg Redoubt

The Lines of Weissenburg, or Lines of Wissembourg, (Note: Note: also known as the Weissenburg Lines or Lignes de Wissembourg. The alternative spellings are derived from the German and French) were entrenched works — an earthen rampart dotted with small outworks — along the river Lauter. They were built in 1706 and lasted into the 19th century.

== History ==
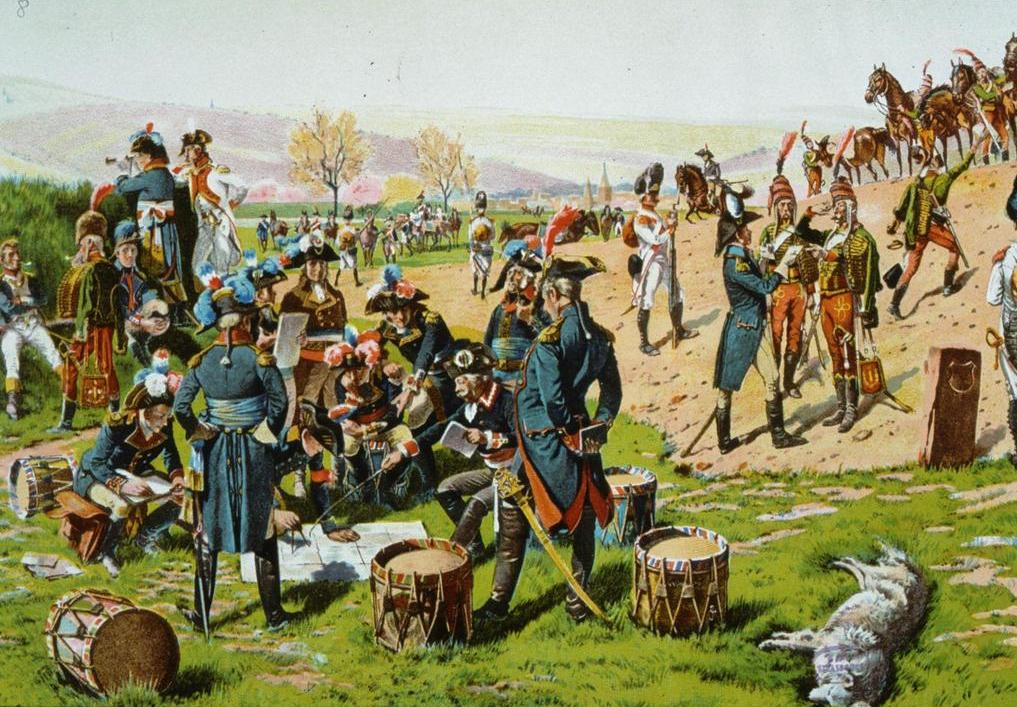
Adam Philippe, Comte de Custine, commander of the Army of the Rhine holds a council of war at the Wissembourg lines.

The Lines were 12 miles (19 km) in length and stretched from Wissembourg on the west to Lauterbourg on the east, where they were anchored on the Rhine River. The French built this chain of fortifications during the War of the Spanish Succession under the orders of the Duke of Villars in 1706.

During the War of the Austrian Succession the loss of the Lines by the French played a pivotal role in the campaign of 1744. French King Louis XV, in command of an army of 90,000, captured Menen and Ypres and prepared to invade the Austrian Netherlands. He was forced to abandon his invasion plans when Prince Charles Alexander of Lorraine, assisted by the veteran Otto Traun, skillfully manoeuvred his army over the Rhine near Philippsburg on July 1, and captured the Lines of Wissembourg. This move cut off an army under Louis, Prince de Conti from Alsace. Although Conti managed to fight his way through the enemy at Wissembourg and posted himself near Strasbourg, Louis XV abandoned the invasion of the Southern Netherlands, and his army moved down to take a decisive part in the war in Alsace and Lorraine.

The Lines were still militarily and strategically significant during the French Revolutionary Wars. The Lines were stormed on 13 October 1793 by an allied army under Austrian General Dagobert von Wurmser in the First Battle of Wissembourg. The allies were in their turn dispossessed by Lazare Hoche and Charles Pichegru in a second Battle of Wissembourg on 26 December and forced to retreat behind the Rhine. (Note: Chisholm 1911, pp. 499–500 notes that Charles Pichegru was in command of the assaulting French sources.)

In 1815, after the Battle of Waterloo, the Austrian Army of the Upper Rhine advanced into France. On 25 June the Crown Prince of Württemberg, commander of the Austrian III Corps, advanced towards the Lines in two columns. The first column assembled at Bergzabern, and the second moved forward by Niederotterbach. Count Wallmoden was directed to advance upon Lauterbourg. The Crown Prince advanced his Corps still further along the Hagenau road. His advanced guard pushed on to Inglesheim, and the main body of the III Corps reached the Lines. The French under General Jean Rapp abandoned the Lines in the night and fell back upon the Forest of Hagenau, occupying the large village of Surbourg.

By 1870 the Lines no longer existed, but the two central forts in the towns of Wissembourg and Altenstadt, still possessed fortifications that proved useful defensive positions during the Battle of Wissembourg. On 4 August 1870 the Germans under the Crown Prince of Prussia, afterwards the emperor Frederick III, gained the first victory of the war over a French corps (part of the army commanded by Patrice de MacMahon) under General Abel Douay, who was killed early in the engagement.
