= Karl Georg Albrecht Ernst von Hake =

Prussian general and minister of war (1768–1835)

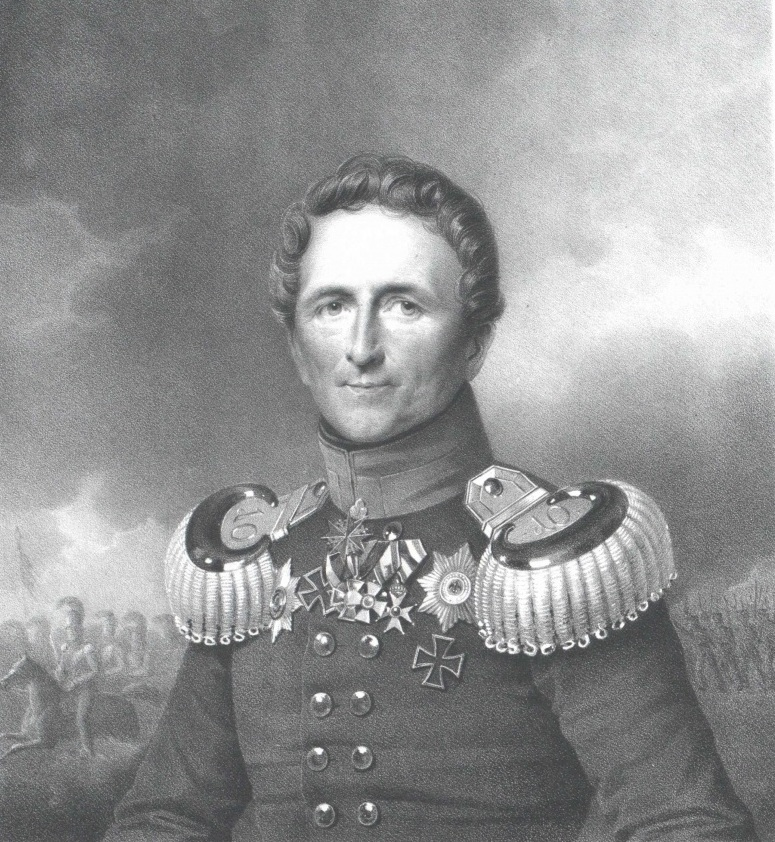
- Born: 8 August 1768; Flatow, Kingdom of Prussia
- Died: 19 May 1835 (aged 66); Castellammare di Stabia, Kingdom of the Two Sicilies
- Military career
- Allegiance: Kingdom of Prussia
- Branch: Prussian Army
- Service years: 1785–1833
- Rank: General der Infanterie
- Unit: North German Corps
- Conflicts: French Revolutionary Wars; Battle of Pirmasens; Napoleonic Wars; Battle of Leipzig; Battle of Waterloo
- Awards: Pour le Merite with oakleaves Order of the Black Eagle; Order of the Red Eagle
- Other work: Prussian Minister of War

Karl Georg Albrecht Ernst von Hake (8 August 1768 – 19 May 1835) was a Prussian general and Minister of War.

== Biography ==
Hake was born on the estate of Flatow (now part of Kremmen) in the Margraviate of Brandenburg. He entered the Prussian Army in 1785. In 1793, while serving in the French Revolutionary Wars under the command of Charles William Ferdinand, Duke of Brunswick, he distinguished himself in the Battle of Pirmasens against France. For his actions he was awarded the order Pour le Mérite.

Hake was appointed to a post in the War Ministry in 1809, and served as Minister of War from 17 June 1810 until August 1813 when he was replaced by Boyen (during which time he attracted much attention by his efficient preparations for war). Subsequently he, by now a Generalmajor, served as Prussian envoy at the headquarters of the Allied Armies. In 1814, serving in his position under Fürst Schwarzenberg, he was awarded the oakleaves to his Pour le Mérite. During the War of the Seventh Coalition he first commanded a brigade in the IV Corps under von Bülow, playing a distinguished part in the Battle of Waterloo, and then led the North German Corps for the remainder of the war.

In 1819 Hake was again appointed Minister of War. In 1825 he was promoted to General of the Infantry. King Frederick William III of Prussia ordered him to conduct experiments into the use of the optical telegraph. Hake, however, was opposed to optical telegraphy and devised several means of preventing the experiments from being implemented. He successfully delayed the experiments until May 1830. Hake finally left the War Ministry in 1833 and died two years later, in 1835, at Castellammare di Stabia near Naples in the Kingdom of the Two Sicilies.

== Notes ==
Political offices
| Preceded by Gerhard von Scharnhorst | Chief of the Prussian General Staff; 1810–1812 | Succeeded by Gustav von Rauch |
| Preceded by Gerhard von Scharnhorst | Prussian Minister of War; 1810–1813 | Succeeded by Hermann von Boyen |
| Preceded by Hermann von Boyen | Prussian Minister of War; 1819–1833 | Succeeded by Job von Witzleben |
