= Corps of Observation of the Vendée =

Formation of the French Imperial Army during the Hundred Days

- Corps d'Observation de La Vendée
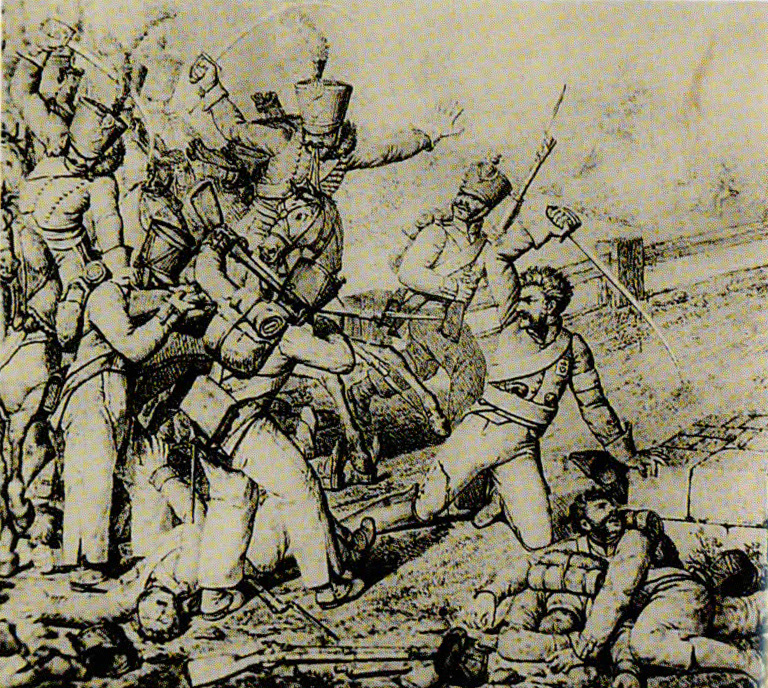
- Imperial soldiers at the Battle of Thouars.
- Active: 1815
- Country: (France) French Empire
- Branch: (France) French Imperial Army
- Type: Corps of Observation
- Size: 24,000 men

Commanders
- Corps Commander: Jean Maximilien Lamarque

The Corps of Observation of the Vendée (French: Corps d'Observation de La Vendée) was a field formation of the French Imperial Army, which took part in the 1815 Vendéen Revolt, one of the minor campaigns of the Hundred Days. Following the end of the War of the Seventh Coalition, the corps (by this time an Army) was disbanded.

== Background ==
In February 1815, Napoleon I returned to France from his exile in Elba. King Louis XVIII fled to Belgium, leaving the throne for him to reoccupy. On the night of May 17 and 18, Napoleon met with his staff discussing the uprising starting in the Vendée after the landing of the Victoire de Donnissan, Marquise de La Rochejaquelein in Bourdeaux.

To deal with the uprising in a hurry, the 15th and 26th Line Infantry Regiments, based in the Loire were to be used. In addition, the 47th Line Regiment, a battalion of the 14th Line Regiment in Orléans, a brigade of Young Guard skirmishers, two artillery batteries, and some 400 local militia were also detached. The force would later be reinforced by the 3rd and 4th battalions of the 14th, 43rd, 65th, and 82nd Line regiments, the 4th and 5th squadrons of the 12th, 16th Dragoons, and the 2nd Hussars, and 13th Chasseurs. These units now formed the Corps of Observation of the Vendée.

Shortly after arriving in the area and its headquarters established, the Vendée Military Division–a regional military district–then sent additional reinforcements, consisting of the 82nd Line Infantry and a battalion of the 15th Line. Shortly after, two new divisions of National Guardsmen were formed in Angers and Niort, where they were joined by 1,000 gendarmes to help police the countryside. The National Guard divisions were provided by the 12th (Charente-Inferieure, Vendée, Loire Inferieure, Deux-Sèvres, and Vienne), 13th (Finistère, Côtes-du-Nord, Ille-et-Vilaine, and Morbihan), and 20th Military Divisions (Corrèze, Dordogne, Lot-et-Garonne, Lot, and Charente) (Districts).

During the Vendéen Revolt, the corps consisted of two divisions, and after 11 June was expanded by 3,000 men, and by the 17th the corps was expanded into the 'Army of the West' (Armée d'Ouest), though also known as the Army of the Vendee (Armée de la Vendée) consisting of 6,000 men. The army was further expanded with reinforcements arriving with a division from Toulouse, a division from Bordeaux, and around 4,000 gendarmes. By this time, the army consists of 24,000 men.

Following the end of the war, the army was reorganised into the 'Royal Army of Vendee' within the new French Royal Army.

== Organisation ==
A 'Corps of Observation' doesn't have any modern equivalent, but during the Napoleonic Wars these Corps were used by the Imperial Army many times. These 'Corps' usually consisted of either one small division, or at max two large corps, being grouped into a 'Regional Army'. The purpose of these corps, throughout the war, was to provide a modern equivalent of border reconnaissance, reporting back to reserve units on enemy movements. These corps could then quickly move and mobilise local units to provide a rearguard till further reinforcements could arrive.

== Order of Battle ==
The below organisation is for the corps after its expansion to an army:

- Army of the West, commanded by Division General Jean Maximilien Lamarque
  - 10 x Squadrons of Gendarmes both mounted and dismounted
  - 3 x Foot Artillery Batteries (24 guns)
  - Cavalry
    - 2nd Guard Chasseurs à Cheval Regiment
    - 14th and 15th Squadrons, 13th Chasseurs à Cheval Regiment
    - 4th Squadron, 2nd Hussar Regiment
    - xx Squadron(s), 4th Dragoon Regiment
    - xx Squadron(s), 5th Dragoon Regiment
    - 4th and 5th Squadrons, 12th Dragoon Regiment
    - xx Squadron(s), 14th Dragoon Regiment
    - 4th and 5th Squadrons, 16th Dragoon Regiment
    - xx Squadron(s), 17th Dragoon Regiment
  - 1st Division, commanded by Division General Michel Silvestre Brayer
    - 1st Brigade, commanded by Maréchal de Camp Étienne Estève
      - 3rd Battalion, 27th Line Infantry Regiment
      - 1st Battalion, 47th Line Infantry Regiment
      - 3rd Battalion, 8th Light Infantry Regiment
      - 2 x Squadrons of Foot Gendarmes
    - 2nd Brigade, commanded by Colonel Mosnier
      - 2nd Young Guard Tirailleur Regiment (2 x Battalions)
      - 2nd Young Guard Voltigeur Regiment (2 x Battalions)
  - 2nd Division, commanded by Division General Jean-Pierre Travot — 2nd division was formed from the Nantes garrison
    - 1st Brigade, commanded by Colonel Levavasseur
      - 1 x Squadron from the Gendarmerie de Paris
      - 1st and 2nd Battalions, 15th Line Infantry Regiment
      - 1st and 2nd Battalions, 43rd Line Infantry Regiment – didn't participate in any actions of note
      - 2nd, 3rd, and 4th Battalions, 65th Line Infantry Regiment
      - 240 gunners of the Naval Artillery
    - 2nd Brigade, commanded by Colonel Prevost
      - 1st, 2nd, and 3rd Battalions, 26th Line Infantry Regiment – suffered 1 mortally wounded, and 2 wounded officers at the Battle of Saint-Pierre-des-Échaubrognes
      - 3rd Battalion, 14th Line Infantry Regiment
      - 28 men of the Chasseurs de la Vendée — a local volunteer unit
  - 1st National Guard Division
  - 2nd National Guard Division
