= Giovanni Pietro Luigi Cacherano d'Osasco =

Italian general

Giovanni Pietro Luigi Cacherano d'Osasco (Note: In some French, English and German sources he is called Louis Cacherano d'Osasco (Société d'etudes du Var 1938, p. 146; Schom 1992, p. 19; and Pinell 1856, p. 324 (last ¶))) of Cantarana (Asti, November 1740 - Turin, 7 June 1831) was an Italian general.

== Biography ==
Cacherano was born in November 1740, to Carlo Giambattista Cacherano Malabaila, count of Cantarana, and Anna Teresa Roero of Cortanze. (Note: sources differ as to the place he was born either in Asti or Turin.(Massabò 1973, Cacherano d'Osasco, Giovanni Pietro Luigi).)

On 3 November 1753 Cacherano became a page of honour to the Grand Master of the Order of Knights of the Hospital of Saint John of Jerusalem (Knights Hospitaller). In 1755 he attended the Royal Academy of Turin leaving in 1757, to join the La Marina Regiment as a Chaplin. In 1781 at his expense commissioned and commanded an armed galley for the Knights Hospitaller residing in Malta which was headquarters of the Knights Hospitaller.

At the end of his time in Malta Cacherano returned to Piedmont, where he received the commendam of San Leonardo di Chieri as a reward. Later he was given that of San Giovanni in Persiceto a position he changed for a similar but better position in Bergamo. He obtained the more senior position of receiver of the Order of Malta in the Grand Priory of Lombardy, ceding it to his brother Felice in 1791.

While earning an ecclesiastical living, Cacherano did not neglect his military career in the Sardinian army. On 20 June 1786 he was commissioned as an infantry lieutenant, and prompted to infantry adjutant general on 28 August 1788. Four years later on 16 March 1792 he obtained the rank of colonel and about a month later (28 April) he was given command of the provincial regiment of Vercelli.

Cacherano had meanwhile continued his military career in the Sardinian army: infantry lieutenant on June 20, 1786, then infantry adjutant general (August 28, 1788), he obtained the rank of colonel on March 16, 1792, and on April 28 of the same year he was assigned to the provincial regiment of Vercelli.

In the Alps campaign of the War of the First Coalition, his regiment performed badly while defending the Linières pass. At the subsequent court martial, which he requested to review his regiment's failure to defend a hill, he was blamed for poor leadership and was suspended from command for three months. Insulted by the verdict, he resigned in February 1794.

Between 1796 and 1799 the war went badly for Sardinia leading to the annexation of Piedmont to France. However, when the Austro-Russian army entered Turin on 26 May 1799 and restored Charles Emmanuel IV of Sardinia to the throne. Cacherano sat on the supreme government council, chaired by the marquis Thaon de Sant 'Andrea, and on 30 November 1799 he was appointed to the rank of major general of the infantry. However the Restoration was only a brief interlude and during the more stable annexation of Piedmont that followed the Battle of Marengo (1800), he lost his ecclesiastical livings, his order of Malta was confiscated, and he held no public office.

In 1814 with the fall of Napoleon the Crown of Savoy was restored and with the restoration Cacherano star rose again. He was sent to Nice as commander general of the region and the city. In 1815 he faced the possibility that he might have to defend Nice against Napoleon Bonaparte who landed at Golfe-Juan at the start of the War of the Seventh Coalition. However Napoleon chose a different route to Paris.

During the Hundred Days Cacherano use the few available forces loyal to him and persuaded the Bonapartists that the population of Nice supported the French Crown and that he was receiving reinforcements with the aid of the British Royal Navy. After the second abdication of Napoleon he accepted the surrender of Marshal Guillaume Brune, commander of the French Armée du Var on 9 July 1815. However unknown to Cacherano this action caused diplomatic problems for the Sardinian government and he was forced to rescind the armistice he had negotiated and return to Turin leaving his command in the hands of Count Ghitini.

This diplomatic incident did not affect his career and on 31 July 1815 he was appointed to the rank of general and on 11 February 1816 he became governor of the Nice division, a position he held until 23 September 1820 when he retired with a new title di grande di Corona (the Great Crown). He lived for a decade more in retirement dying in Turin on 7 June 1831.
