= Jean-Pierre Maransin =

French general (1770–1828)

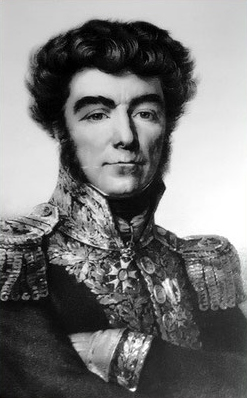
General of Division Jean-Pierre Maransin

Jean-Pierre Maransin (French pronunciation: [ʒɑ̃ pjɛʁ maʁɑ̃sɛ̃]; 20 March 1770 in Lourdes – 15 May 1828 in Paris) was a général de division of the First French Empire who saw action during the Peninsular War. He was appointed colonel of the 1st Legion du Midi on 27 January 1807 and promoted to général de brigade on 8 November 1808.

== Career ==
Maransin participated in Andoche Junot's invasion of Portugal and was stationed in the southern province of Algarve when the revolt against French occupation broke out. When his bedridden commanding officer Antoine Maurin was captured by the Portuguese, Maransin gathered up the troops in the province. These 1,200 men included the Legion du Midi and a battalion of the 26th Line Infantry Regiment. He successfully withdrew to Lisbon via Mértola and Beja.

He fought at the Battle of Albuera on 16 May 1811. Maransin's final promotion to the rank of Général de Division occurred on 20 May 1813, and he was named Commander of the Légion d’Honneur on 15 December 1814.
