= Ferdinand, Graf Bubna von Littitz =

Austrian field marshal lieutenant

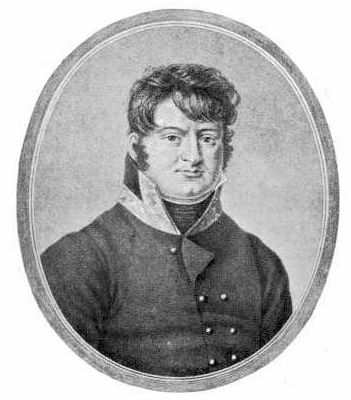
General Bubna

Ferdinand, Graf Bubna von Littitz (Czech: Bubna z Litic, 26 November 1768 – 6 June 1825) was a Field marshal lieutenant (Feldmarschalleutnant) of the Imperial Austrian Army during the Napoleonic Wars and also an Austrian Privy Councillor. Bubna is remembered for his role in the liberation of Geneva and the Léman region from fifteen years of French occupation on 29 December 1813. His actions were partially responsible for the creation of the Canton of Geneva which was finalized in 1814-15 at the Congress of Vienna.

== Geneva ==
=== December 1813: Entering Geneva ===
On 29 December 1813, Bubna and his army liberated the city of Geneva (present day Switzerland) from French occupation effectively ending the fifteen year French Department of Leman. He ordered the creation of a Genevan Provisional Government to handle the administrative duties left vacant by the overthrown of the Department of Léman.

With the collapse of the Napoleonic Empire in the Léman Region, Bubna was the first to suggest the city and its constituent territories join the Swiss Confederation. He was reported to have said upon entering the city, “these are the natural borders of your republic aggregated to Switzerland” while gesturing to the Lake Geneva and the Alps and Jura mountains. Bubna remained in the city until June 1, 1814 when a Swiss contingent of troops from Friborg and Solothurn landed at Port Noir which signified the transition from occupied Austrian territory to Swiss territory.

The relationship between Bubna and the elite of the city was defined by dramatic swings in approval and disapproval. When Bubna's troops entered Geneva, the people of Geneva lined the streets and shouted "Vivent les Alliés (Long Live the Allies)!" However for the Genevan population, the extended presence of Bubna and his troops through January and February 1814, "rhymed and will always rhyme with suffering." Bubna confiscated Genevan weapons and ammunition to help defend the city from French reprisal, yet the Genevan population viewed this as a violation of their independence. He also ordered Genevan households to quarter Austrian troops and cover all expenses related to housing and feeding them. Things took a turn in late January and early February 1814. For Bubna, "Geneva, like the rest of the [former] department [of Léman]" was considered "conquered country." On January 20, Bubna ordered the Genevan Provisional Government to levy taxes in order to help fund the fortifications and defense of the city. The Provisional Government had previously taken out loans to cover these expenses--loans issued by members serving as syndics within the Provisional Government.

=== March 1814: Political issues and French siege ===
Bubna fought several battles in the Léman region during the period of Genevan occupation.

While the negotiations with the Provisional Government were underway, Napoleon ordered Charles-Pierre Augereau, Marshal of the Empire, and commander of Lyon to recapture Geneva. Savoyards and French Gessiens began drafting "pardons for the day when Napoleon's army returned to Geneva."
French loyalist General Joseph Marie, Count Dessaix, also "placed himself at the disposal of the Emperor's government when he learned of the occupation of Geneva by Bubna." Dessaix levied troops from across the (now defunct) Department of Léman and the Department of Mont-Blanc in order to rally Napoleonic loyalists in defense of the region. Bubna's troops met Dessaix's troops at Thonon, Annecy, and Chambery which all fell on January 14, January 20, and January 21 respectively.

French forces had retaken Montmélian and Annecy by February 15. On February 27, French troops also took Saint-Julien, Archcamps, and Collonges; and on February 28, Bubna ordered the city into "a state of siege."

On March 2, Bubna was forced to withdraw within the city walls. After a series of failed negotiations, the entire Provisional Government resigned on the same day. In a letter to Allied Powers, Bubna indicated he was resigned to abandoning Geneva, allowing the French to retake the city. In fact, Bubna was quite literally packed and ready to leave until a French parliamentarian arrived and demanded a parlay with Bubna. The Genevan syndic Marc-August Pictet was present for this meeting and recalled:

Yesterday, March 3, at two o’clock M. de Bubna received a parliamentarian, the Captain of the Engineers Couchaud, who summoned him verbally on behalf of General Dessaix (then in Carouge), to evacuate the place in three hours. The general nearly threw him out by the shoulders. Couchaud returned as he had come. I arrived at M. de Bubna’s a few moments after this scene and found him very angry and determined not to enter unto any parley with people who treated him in this way.

Couchaud's arrogance and tone ignited in Bubna a frustration which caused him to change his strategy. He was no longer ready to abandon the city, but rather determined to beat the French. This hatred of the French and the way Couchaud treated him inspired him to put aside his issues with the Provisional Government and resume fighting. Within twenty-four hours, Bubna's army was successful, "Geneva was saved." Whether the Provisional Government had resigned because of Bubna's demands or out of fear of French reprisal for their defection is debated since many syndics fled.

Geneva was admitted to the Swiss Confederation on 19 May 1815.

== Later commands ==
He held some military commands in the Kingdom of Lombardy and Venetia and led the reprisal of the Italian revolutions in 1820–21.
