= Hans Conrad Finsler =

Swiss politician (1765–1839)

- Born: 18 August 1765; Zurich, Old Swiss Confederacy
- Died: 21 December 1839 (aged 74); Bern, Switzerland
- Occupations: Politician; military officer; banker
- Spouse: Dorothea Escher vom Glas (m. 1788)
- Parents: Hans Georg Finsler (father); Anna Barbara Escher vom Glas (mother)
- Relatives: Hans Jakob Finsler (brother)

Hans Conrad Finsler (18 August 1765 – 21 December 1839) was a Swiss politician and military officer from Zurich. He was the first finance minister of the Helvetic Republic, from 1804 to 1829 he held the office of colonel quartermaster (Oberstquartiermeister), and from 1809 to 1829 he directed the national survey, which he had initiated. In 1829 the bankruptcy of the bank run by his brother forced him to resign from all his offices.

== Biography ==
Hans Conrad Finsler was born on 18 August 1765 in Zurich, the son of Hans Georg Finsler, a merchant and member of the Small Council, and Anna Barbara Escher vom Glas. In 1788 he married Dorothea Escher vom Glas, daughter of Salomon Escher vom Glas, a member of the council (Ratsherr) and bailiff (Landvogt).

Finsler was a pupil of Johann Heinrich Füssli, the Obmann. With his brother Hans Jakob (1767–1835) he carried on their father's silk firm until 1808, and from 1803 the two brothers ran the bank Gebrüder Finsler & Comp.

In 1787, as a lieutenant, Finsler became a member of the Mathematical-Military Society of Zurich (Mathematisch-militärische Gesellschaft), which he presided over in 1816. In 1795 he became adjutant general of the artillery, and in 1796 a Zwölferrat (one of the guild's twelve council members) of the Widder guild.

During the Helvetic Republic, Finsler was its first finance minister in 1798–1799, but he was dismissed at the instigation of Frédéric-César de La Harpe. After the first coup d'état of January 1800 he joined the executive committee (Vollziehungsausschuss), where his responsibilities included military affairs. He led the second coup d'état and was a member of the Legislative Council (Gesetzgebender Rat) in 1800–1801. In 1802 he supported the uprising against the Helvetic government in Zurich.

From 1803 to 1829 Finsler was a member of the Grand Council and of the Small Council of the canton of Zurich, where he dealt with finance, buildings and the salt office (Salzamt). From 1806 to 1829 he presided over the Merchants' Directorate (Kaufmännisches Direktorium), and from 1814 to 1829 he was a member of the Council of State (Staatsrat).

From 1804 to 1829 Finsler held the office of colonel quartermaster (Oberstquartiermeister), and in this capacity he planned the expansion of the federal fortifications from 1815 to 1829. During the mobilization of 1815 he was temporarily quartermaster general (Generalquartiermeister) and at times interim commander-in-chief (Oberinterimskommandant) with the rank of major general. In 1816 the Federal Diet (Tagsatzung) honored him with a golden sword. From 1809 to 1829 he directed the national survey (Landesvermessung), which he had initiated, and he wrote several reports for the Diet.

Finsler had obtained extensive loans for the bank run by his brother, mainly from the salt office. The bank's bankruptcy forced him to resign from all his offices in 1829. He moved to Bern, where he worked as a member of the commission for the national survey (Kommission für Landesaufnahme). He died in Bern on 21 December 1839.

== Bibliography ==
- J. H. Graf, Die schweizerische Landesvermessung 1832–1864, 1896
- Der Schweizerische Generalstab, 3, 59
- D. Gugerli and D. Speich, Topografien der Nation, 2002

=== Archives ===
- Burgerbibliothek Bern, papers (Nachlass)
