= Rémy Joseph Isidore Exelmans =

French soldier (1775–1852)

Marshal Rémy Joseph Isidore Exelmans 1st Count Exelmans
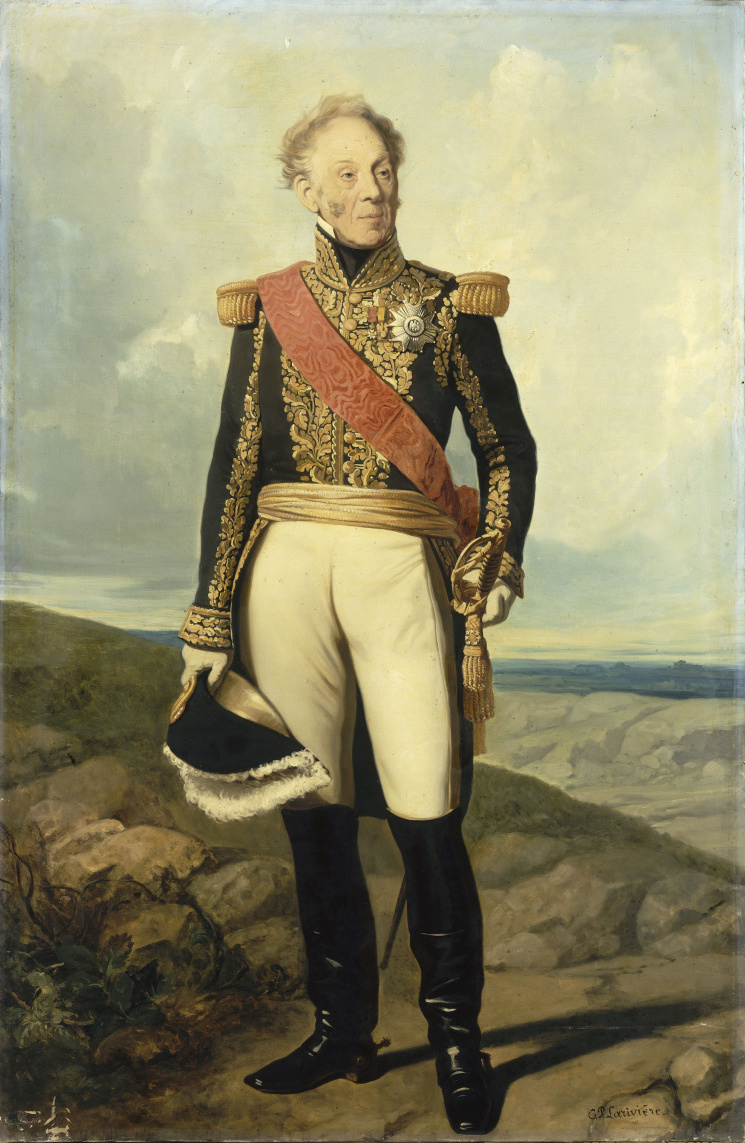
- Maréchal Exelmans, by Charles-Philippe Larivière, c. 1852
- Born: 13 November 1775; Bar-le-Duc, France
- Died: 22 June 1852 (aged 76); Sèvres, France
- Military career
- Allegiance: First French Republic; First French Empire; Bourbon Restoration; July Monarchy; French Second Republic; Second French Empire
- Branch: French Army
- Service years: 1791–1852
- Rank: Maréchal de France
- Commands: II Cavalry Corps
- Wars: War of the First Coalition; Italian campaign; War of the Third Coalition; Battle of Wertingen; Battle of Elchingen; War of the Fourth Coalition; Peninsular War; Battle of Valencia; French invasion of Russia; Battle of Borodino; War of the Sixth Coalition; Battle of Leipzig; German campaign; War of the Seventh Coalition; Waterloo campaign; Battle of Ligny; Battle of Rocquencourt
- Awards: Legion of Honour (Grand Croix)

Marshal Rémy Joseph Isidore Exelmans, 1st Comte Exelmans (French pronunciation: [ʁemi ʒozɛf izidɔʁ ɛɡzɛlmɑ̃], 13 November 1775 – 22 June 1852) was a distinguished French soldier of the Revolutionary and Napoleonic Wars, as well as a political figure of the following period.

His name is inscribed on the southern pillar of the Arc de Triomphe in Paris.

== Early life and career ==
Exelmans was born at Bar-le-Duc, the former capital of a what had been, a few years before, the Duchy of Bar, to Guillaume-Izidor Exelmans, a merchant, and his wife, Françoise Belhomme. Exelmans entered the French Revolutionary Army at 16, joining the 3rd battalion of Meuse volunteers in 1791. During the War of the First Coalition, he served in the armies of the Moselle and Sambre-et-Meuse, rising through the enlisted ranks to become sergeant major by 1796.

He was commissioned a second lieutenant in October 1796, and joined the Army of Italy in 1797 for the invasion of Italy. In 1798, he became aide-de-camp to General Eblé, and in the following year, he was aide-de-camp to General Broussier. He distinguished himself in his first campaign in Italy, and in April 1799 was promoted to the provisional rank of captain in the 16th dragoon regiment. In the same year. In 1801, he was made aide-de-camp to Marshal Joachim Murat, with whom he became close friends.

== Aide-de-camp to Marshal Murat ==
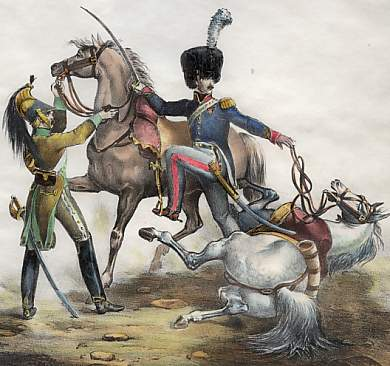
Exelmans at the action of Wertingen

During the campaigns against the Third and Fourth Coalitions from 1805 to 1807, he served as Murat's aide-de-camp. At the crossing of the Danube, and in the Battle of Wertingen he especially distinguished himself. He was appointed to the rank of colonel two days before the Battle of Elchingen, and was made a brigadier general in May 1807.

== Peninsular War, captivity and Naples ==
At the start of the Peninsular War in 1808, Exelmans accompanied Marshal Murat to Spain. In June, he was sent to join Marshal Bon-Adrien Jeannot de Moncey's army which was marching to attack Valencia. At this time, the Spanish countryside was rife with rebellion and he was captured by partisans and taken to Valencia. He was handed over to the British and taken to England as a prisoner. Escaping in 1811, he travelled to Naples, where Murat, who was reigning as King, appointed him as his Equerry.

== Invasion of Russia ==
Exelmans rejoined the Grande Armée on the eve of Napoleon's invasion of Russia and was appointed major in the Grenadiers à Cheval de la Garde Impériale. In the aftermath of the Battle of Borodino, he was promoted to Général de Division and took command of the light cavalry division. Wounded in the Battle of Vilnius, he returned to Paris on convalescent leave.

== War of the Sixth Coalition ==
Upon recovering from his wound in 1813, he rejoined the Imperial army in Dresden. He was present at the disastrous defeat at Leipzig, and following the campaign in Germany was made a Grand Officer in the Legion of Honour. With France's enemies closing in, Exelmans fought courageously until the allies occupied Paris and Napoleon abdicated, ending the War of the Sixth Coalition.

== Hundred Days ==
When the Bourbons were restored, Exelmans was made inspector general and a knight of St Louis. In January 1815, he was tried on accusations of having treasonable relations with Murat, but was acquitted.

Upon Napoleon's return from Elba in the Hundred Days, Exelmans was temporarily made a Peer of France, and was placed in command of the II Cavalry Corps, consisting of Major General Strolz's 9th Cavalry Division and Major General Chastel's 10th Cavalry Division. During the Waterloo Campaign, the corps fought in the battles of Ligny and Wavre. In the final operations around Paris, he won distinction on 1 July at the Battle of Rocquencourt, where units under his command isolated and destroyed an advanced Prussian hussar brigade under the command of Colonel von Sohr.

== Restoration, July Monarchy, and Second Republic ==
After Napoleon was finally defeated and the Bourbons were once again restored, the royal decree of 24 July 1815 declared that Exelmans and 56 other generals who had sworn allegiance to the king and then joined Napoleon upon his return were to be tried for a variety of charges, including treason. Exelmans fled to the Netherlands, where he lived in exile until 1819, when he was granted amnesty and returned to France. In 1828, he was appointed inspector general of cavalry.

During the Second Republic, Exelmans was a supporter of Louis Napoléon. In recognition of his loyalty to the Bonapartes, he was awarded the Grand Cross of the Legion of Honour and was made Grand Chancellor of the order in 1849. In 1851, he was elevated to the rank of Marshal of France. His death in 1852 was the result of a fall from his horse.

== Sources ==
- Oman, Charles (2010). A History of the Peninsular War Volume I. La Vergne, Tenn.: Kessinger Publishing. ISBN 978-1432636821.

Attribution
