= Horse Grenadiers =

Horse Grenadiers may refer to any of the following cavalry units:

- Horse Grenadier Guards, British division of the Household Cavalry, founded in 1687 and disbanded in 1788
- Mounted Grenadiers of the Imperial Guard, French cavalry regiment, founded in 1804 and disbanded in 1815
- Mounted Grenadiers Regiment, Argentinian cavalry regiment, founded in 1812

== See also ==
- Dragoon
- Grenadier
