= Jean Baptiste Alexandre Strolz =

French general

Jean-Baptiste Alexandre Baron de Strolz, sometimes written Stroltz, (French pronunciation: [ʒɑ̃ batist alɛksɑ̃dʁ də ʃtʁɔlts]; 6 August 1771 – 27 October 1841), was a French general during the Napoleonic Wars, and subsequently an important political figure.

He was chief of staff to André Masséna during the Italian campaign, governor of the Basilicata province, aide-de-camp to Joseph Bonaparte, Baron of the First French Empire, Member of Parliament, and Pair de France.

Strolz is one of the names inscribed under the Arc de Triomphe, on Column 22.

== Early life and family ==
Strolz was born at 5, Rue de l'Etuve in Belfort. He was the second son of Maria Clara, née Schmitt, and Peter Leo (also known as Pierre Léon or Peter Leopold), architect and the Royal Inspector of Bridges and Streets in the Franche-Comté. His older brother was Petrus Franciscus Emilius, also written as Pierre Francois Emile. Strolz's family was from the minor Austrian nobility. His paternal grandfather had left his native Austria as a young man to avoid the ecclesiastical career his parents had assigned him. Strolz received his early education from a parish priest, following which he was sent to boarding school at Masevaux Abbey and to the Gymnase de Strasbourg. His family had a close friendship with Jean Baptiste Kléber, and after the early death of Kléber's father, with his stepfather Jean-Martin Burger; an entrepreneur and master carpenter-builder who often worked with Pierre Léon. Strolz's parents had Jean-Baptiste trained for a career as a lawyer, but he gave up his studies when called home by his parents during the French Revolution. He found temporary employment as sous-archiviste in the civil service in the district of Belfort.

As a consequence of the French Revolution, insurgent activity began in the neighbouring Prince-Bishopric of Basel. The reigning Prince-Bishop Franz Joseph Sigismund von Roggenbach asked for and received a contingent of Austrian troops to deal with the situation, while his auxiliary bishop Jean-Baptiste-Joseph Gobel secretly supported the revolutionaries. The revolutionary government in Paris saw this deployment as a possible threat for the Belfort region, and mobilized the 5th French (Strasbourg) Division along the border. In March 1790, Strolz volunteered for service with General Pierre Joseph de Ferrier du Chatelet, general officer commanding all regular and volunteer troops in the Belfort region and a friend of his parents. The general put him to work as an supernumerary aide de camp; an important role in a time when all communications in the field had to be delivered by couriers. Discharged in 1791 after the crisis had passed, the beginning of the French Revolutionary Wars gave Strolz the opportunity to re-enlist. Refused at first, Strolz was only accepted after family friend Jean-Baptiste Kléber, inspector of public buildings in Belfort before having just secured for himself a lieutenant-colonelcy, insisted on Strolz being accepted as a volunteer. After his parents agreed to pay for a horse, Strolz was permitted to enlist on 8 April 1793.

== Service in the Revolutionary Wars ==
=== War of the First Coalition ===
As a cavalryman of the French Revolutionary Army during the War of the First Coalition campaigns of 1793 and 1794, Strolz served with the 1st Régiment de Chasseurs à Cheval, who at that time were garrisoned in Metz. He fought in the Armée de la Moselle and took part in the expedition into Germany, being present at the taking of Trier and at the Battle of Arlon. In 1794, his regiment was part of General Laboissière's cavalry brigade in the Saint-Cyr Division of the French Army of the Rhine. With the Armée du Nord, he fought at the first Battle of Fleurus. Strolz's reputation for bravery led to his appointment to the Armée de Sambre-et-Meuse (1794–96). After being promoted to brevet lieutenant, General Kléber appointed Strolz as his aide de camp in September 1794. On 26 December 1795, Strolz was given a regular commission as a lieutenant in the 16th Régiment de Chasseurs à Cheval, and having been described by Kléber as a "patriotic, capable and courageous citizen", was recommended for further promotion. Strolz also performed the duties of a private secretary for his general, and later edited most of Kléber's memoirs of the Vendee Campaign.

On 30 May 1796, two days before the official end of the armistice, Kléber ordered the crossing of the Rhine near Düsseldorf. When the crossing was carried out under intense enemy fire, Strolz was at Kleber's side in the first barge. In execution of the plan, Kléber made the first move, advancing south from Düsseldorf against the Württemberg wing of the Imperial Army of the Lower Rhine. On 1 June 1796, a division of Kléber's troops led by François Joseph Lefebvre seized a bridge over the Sieg from Michael von Kienmayer's Austrians at Siegburg. Even though momentum was initially on the French side, the Army of Sambre and Meuse was defeated by Archduke Charles at the Battle of Wetzlar on 15 June 1796, and Jourdan lost no time in recrossing to the safety of the west shore of the Rhine at Neuwied. Following up, the Austrians clashed with Kléber's divisions at Uckerath, inflicting 3,000 casualties on the French for a loss of only 600. Nevertheless, Kléber managed to withdraw in an orderly fashion into the Düsseldorf defences.

Kléber was a man with a short fuse, and had a tendency for outbursts. Following a vicious dressing down from Kléber over something Strolz said on a social occasion, Strolz resigned from Kléber's service despite having known Kléber since childhood, and refused to eat at the General's table when invited. In that era, to reject such an invitation was close to impossible for a subordinate, and could have been career-ending. Kléber later said that good aides-de-camp were hard to come by, and made amends by "apologizing as a Christian" to Strolz, calling his actions character building. Strolz returned, and shared the duties of aide-de-camp to Kléber with François-Étienne de Damas and Frédéric Auguste de Beurmann. Named "les inséparables" (The Inseparables), all three would end their careers as generals. When Kléber, despite his successes, fell into disgrace with the Directoire and was relieved of his command (and almost, too, his head), Strolz was transferred to the Armée de Batavie and, on 23 January 1798, appointed aide de camp to General Jacques Maurice Hatry. Strolz was promoted to captain with the 16th Régiment de Chasseurs à Cheval in June 1798. It was Strolz who clarified later that it was a denunciation by Lazare Hoche that had led to Kléber's removal from command; Strolz had seen a compromising letter in Hoche's papers. Austria signed the Treaty of Campo Formio in October, ceding Belgium to France and recognising French control of the Rhineland and much of Italy. The ancient Republic of Venice was partitioned between Austria and France. This ended the War of the First Coalition, although Great Britain and France remained at war.

=== War of the Second Coalition ===
After Kléber was reactivated for the Egyptian campaign by Napoleon Bonaparte, he wrote Strolz a letter, offering him a position on his staff, and later repeated the offer in person. Strolz, however, refused, stating that “fighting the immediate enemies of France carries more glory than fighting on the banks of the Nile”. Strolz was transferred to the staff of Jean Victor Marie Moreau, general commanding the French Army of the Rhine on 16 December 1799, and was promoted to major (chef d’escadron ) on 21 January 1799. The transfer was made permanent when, on 22 November 1800, Strolz was officially confirmed as Moreau's aide-de-camp.

After the victory at the Battle of Hohenlinden, where the French army under Jean Victor Marie Moreau won a decisive victory over the Austrians and Bavarians led by Archduke John of Austria, Strolz received a citation for having crossed enemy lines three times during the battle to deliver dispatches to General Antoine Richepanse, actions that Moreau rated as decisive for winning the battle. Archduke John ordered his demoralized army to a retreat, where Moreau pursued cautiously until 8 December where, after 15 days, his forces advanced 300 km and captured 20,000 Austrians. General de Division Claude Lecourbe's right wing brushed aside General Graf Johann Sigismund Riesch’s defences at Rosenheim on 9 December and broke through to Salzburg, where on 14 December, the archduke held off Lecourbe in a successful rearguard action. This success was only temporary, in a series of swift French actions at Neumarkt am Wallersee, Frankenmarkt, Schwanenstadt, Vöcklabruck, Lambach and Kremsmünster during the following week, the retreating Austrian army lost cohesion. Richepanse greatly distinguished himself in the pursuit. On 17 December, when Archduke Charles relieved his brother John, the Austrian army was practically a rabble. With French forces 80 km from Vienna, Charles requested an armistice, which Moreau, who had sent Strolz on numerous occasions to Charles' headquarters as an envoy, granted on 25 December. After being forced into a disastrous retreat, the allies were compelled to request an armistice that effectively ended the War of the Second Coalition. In February 1801, the Austrians signed the Treaty of Lunéville, accepting French control up to the Rhine and French puppet republics in Italy and the Netherlands. The subsequent Treaty of Amiens between France and Britain began the longest break in the wars of the Napoleonic period. When peace was declared, Strolz asked for, and received on 24 August 1801, a transfer as major (chef d’escadron) to the 16th Régiment de Chasseurs à Cheval, the regiment he was nominally a part of since 1798. On 29 October 1803 (6 Brumaire XII), Strolz was advanced to the newly created rank of "major de cavallerie" (the equivalent of a lieutenant colonel) with the 19th Régiment de Chasseurs à Cheval, and he was made a Chevalier de la Légion d' Honneur on 25 March 1804 (5 Germinal an XI), with the register number 13446.

=== War of the Third Coalition - Service in the Armée d'Italie ===
On 26 May 1805, Napoleon I was crowned at the Duomo di Milano, Milan with the Iron Crown of Lombardy, and from then on until his abdication was styled as "Emperor of the French and King of Italy" (French: Empereur des Français et Roi d'Italie). Among the troops who accompanied Napoleon were Strolz's 19th Régiment de Chasseurs à Cheval, who had entered Italy in March. Having been present at the coronation, Strolz was awarded the Order of the Iron Crown on 6 June 1805, and was selected for service in the staff of General, and later Field Marshal, André Massena as deputy chief of staff. He served as chief of staff at the Battle of Verona, and the Battle of Caldiero, where his brilliant conduct resulted in a battlefield promotion to full colonel on 29 October 1805. When news of an Allied landing in Naples reached Massena in November 1805, it was Strolz who was tasked to bring detailed reports to Napoleon. Strolz selected twenty of the best dragoons, and made it through territory partly held by the Allies to Napoleon's headquarters in Germany. Arriving just in time to deliver the news and recover, Strolz fought in the Battle of Austerlitz on 2 December 1805, where he received thirteen lance wounds in a charge but survived. After recovery, Strolz returned to Italy with the four remaining dragoons of the twenty who had left Italy with him. Crossing enemy-held territory again, Strolz's small column was taken prisoner by Austrian troops but managed to escape to their own lines at night.

== Service with Joseph Bonaparte in the Kingdom of Naples ==
Having returned from Germany with a renewed reputation for endurance, robustness, and luck, in December 1805, Strolz was appointed adjutant general in the French Army in Italy by Joseph Bonaparte, King of Naples. Officially transferred to the personal staff of Joseph on 25 July 1806, Strolz was described as calm, diligent, proud, laborious, and of absolute loyalty. Strolz was immediately tasked with organising and commanding the Regiment des Chevaux Légers of the Royal Guards, a regiment whose uniform was that of the Imperial Guard. An uprising of insurgents loyal to deposed King Ferdinand resulted in Strolz's appointment as Governor of the Basilicate Province. The successful end to this campaign saw him promoted to brigadier general in the Army of the Kingdom of Naples on 30 October 1807. During a pilgrimage to Rome, Strolz was made a Knight of the Papal Order of the Golden Spur and Comte palatin de l'eglise de Saint-Jean du Latran on 2 February 1807.

Strolz was put in command of an infantry brigade for a planned Sicily campaign under David-Maurice-Joseph Mathieu de La Redorte, but British domination of the Mediterranean made it impossible for the French to transport troops to Sicily in order to gain control of the island. Joseph's kingdom remained confined to the mainland kingdom of Naples alone, while Ferdinand continued to reside in and rule the Kingdom of Sicily. After accession to the throne of Naples, Joseph, in the modernising spirit of the French Revolution, implemented a programme of far reaching reforms to the organisation and structure of the ancient feudal Kingdom of Naples. Joseph gave the country its first constitution, which decreed the abolition of Feudalism on 2 August 1806 and ordered the rescission of all the rights and privileges of the nobility. All of these measures proved popular.

On 20 May 1808, Strolz was named grand ecuyer and aide-de-camp of King Joseph of Naples, and advanced to commander of the ordine delle due Sicilie. Strolz's cousin, also named Jean Baptiste (often called Jean-Jacques), a career artillery officer and godson of Strolz's mother, followed him first to Naples. On 9 November 1807, he was appointed as colonel and commanding officer of the Artillery of the Royal Guards of Naples (Chef de Battaillon Commandant l' Artillerie de la Garde du Roi de Naples), and later on 20 December 1809, was sent to Spain where he was made colonel commandant of the Artillery of the Guards of the King of Spain.

== Service with Joseph Bonaparte in Spain ==
In November 1807, a combined French-Spanish Force occupied Portugal. Napoleon had close to 100,000 troops stationed in Spain. On 19 March 1808, following a popular revolt at the winter palace, Aranjuez forced King Charles IV of Spain to abdicate in favour of his son Ferdinand VII. The deposed king turned to Napoleon for help and, on March 23, Joachim Murat's troops occupied Madrid. Summoned before Napoleon in Bayonne in April 1808, both Bourbon kings were made to abdicate the crown, and the dynasty of Spain was declared deposed. The crown of Spain was transferred to the Emperor of France. Napoleon then ordered Murat, still garrisoned in Madrid, to request the Council General of Castile, the Council of Government, and the Council of the Municipality of Madrid to decide on a future king. The members of those legislative bodies, all good Catholics and all at that time in Murat's hands, eagerly expressed their wish to choose the excommunicated Freemason Joseph Bonaparte as their new king, and sent a delegation of distinguished men to convey this wish to the Emperor. On 6 June 1808, Napoleon made use of this choice and proclaimed his brother King of Spain. This was without the latter's knowledge; Joseph, together with a detachment of guards commanded by Strolz, was still on his way to Bayonne to where he had been summoned by Napoleon. Napoleon met Joseph on the road, and on the last leg to Bayonne, softened him up sufficiently that Joseph agreed to meet the Spanish delegation. On Napoleon's insistence, Joseph accepted the throne of Spain and reluctantly gave up Naples to Joachim Murat, husband of his sister Caroline Bonaparte.

On 15 July 1808, Strolz left the service of the Kingdom of Naples and joined the Army of the Kingdom of Spain. He was again appointed as aide-de-camp to Joseph Bonaparte (now styled King José I of Spain). Interestingly, Joseph Bonaparte, member in good standing of a Masonic lodge and originally a trained lawyer, brought with him a large number of officers with republican leanings. These officers were not happy with the transformation of the Consulate for Life into a hereditary Empire, and amongst them was Strolz. On 12 July 1808, Strolz entered Madrid with his king. Joseph's arrival sparked a Spanish revolt against French rule and the beginning of the Peninsular War. A little more than two weeks later, on 29 July 1808, Strolz had to cover Joseph's retreat from Madrid due to another popular uprising. With most of the French army, Joseph temporarily retreated to northern Spain. Feeling himself in an untenable position, Joseph proposed his own abdication from the Spanish throne, hoping that Napoleon would sanction his return to the much-preferred Neapolitan Throne. Napoleon dismissed Joseph's misgivings out of hand, and to back up the raw and ill-trained levies he had initially allocated to Spain, the Emperor sent heavy French reinforcements to assist Joseph in maintaining his position as king. Despite the recapture of Madrid and nominal control by Joseph's government over many cities and provinces, the king and his supporters never established complete control over the country. Made premier equerry of the royal household of Spain (primer escudero del rey), gazetted 5 December 1809, Strolz gained a reputation for leading the Caballerizas reales efficiently, with absolute punctuality and a complete intolerance for intrigues and nepotism. The nature of the Peninsular War meant that Strolz's posting was not a laid-back headquarters position. He served with Joseph in all the campaigns in Spain, and distinguished himself as commanding officer of a brigade of chasseurs à cheval at the battles of Alcabou and Almonacid. On 8 November 1808, Strolz was cited by Napoleon for bravery at the Battle of Espinosa de los Monteros.

The French campaign turned sour when, as part of the overall plan to rid the Spanish peninsula of Napoleonic influence, General Wellesley's 20,000 British troops advanced into Spain to join 33,000 Spanish troops under General Cuesta on 27–28 July 1809. Marching up the Tagus valley to Talavera de la Reina, c. 120 km southwest of Madrid, they encountered 46,000 French troops, nominally led by the French King of Spain, Joseph Bonaparte, but with his military adviser Field Marshal Jean-Baptiste Jourdan effectively exercising command over Field Marshal Claude Victor's I Corps and Major-General Horace Sebastiani's IV Corps. On 28 July 1808, Strolz commanded a cavalry brigade in Christophe Antoine Merlin's Light Cavalry Division. The division was only formed on 25 July 1808 on the king's orders by merging most of IV Corps' cavalry assets with I Corps' cavalry. This was primarily to reinforce I Corps at the head of the army column. After the defeat of the main French attack, General Sir George Anson's cavalry brigade, part of the Duke of Alburquerque's 1st and 2nd Cavalry Divisions, was ordered to drive the French further back, and to encircle and capture as many French troops as possible. When a combined Portuguese-English Horse cavalry charge attempted a flank attack, it was General Strolz's brigade of light horse, led by him personally, that waited until the attackers had passed and then charged them in flank and rear. Strolz's men on that day were the 10th Regiment de Chasseurs à Cheval, led by Colonel Jacques-Gervais de Subervie, and the 26th Regiment de Chasseurs à Cheval led by Colonel Jacques-Laurent-Louis-Augustin Baron Vial. Together with Colonel François Léon Ormancey's Brigade consisting of the Polish Vistula Lancers Regiment (Regiment de Lanciers Polonais de la Vistule) and the Westphalian Light Cavalry Regiment (Regiment de Chevaux-Légers de Westphalie), they succeeded in encircling the British 23rd Light Dragoons, thus being responsible for one of the few French successes during the battle of Talavera. The 23rd Light Dragoons lost 102 killed and wounded on that day with another 105 captured. Only a handful riders cut their way out and the remains of the regiment had to be sent back to England to be refitted. The successful action contributed to the French disengagement from the enemy and kept the British from pursuing the main force. King Joseph and Marshal Jourdan were harshly criticized by Napoleon for not having employed their reserves and therefore making a victory impossible.

On 30 August 1809, King Joseph wrote to Napoleon:

(...) General Strolz, my aide-de-camp had the good fortune to command the brigade which captured the 23d regiment of English cavalry. I pray your majesty to create him officer of the Legion of honour, he is already a legionary; this is a reward which he will value more highly than any other that could be given him. He is the same officer whom your Majesty entrusted to reconnoitre on arriving at Vittoria and who, on giving account to your Majesty at Burgos deserved that you should say of him to me: "There is an officer of the right sort". He has proved himself such at the battle of Alcabou, at Talavera and at Almonacid. Sire, Your most devoted servant and affectionate brother. Joseph.

Strolz did not receive the decoration for which Joseph Bonaparte had recommended him until 1814, but was made a Baron of the French Empire by letters patent of 15 June 1810, advanced to Grand Gross of the Ordre Royal d’Espagne (18 June 1810) and received a gift of 2 Million Spanish Reals. As Marechal de Camp et Premier Ecuyer du Roi, on 15 February 1811, he was promoted to Lieutenant Général in the Army of the Kingdom of Spain. Strolz was, on the very same day, advanced to one of only two Grand Cordons de l'Ordre Royal d'Espagne awarded by King Joseph.

Strolz was often responsible for delivering personal letters between Joseph and his wife; in one of them (Madrid 19 October 1811) Joseph asked her not just about her health but instructed her to withdraw one million Francs promised to him by Napoleon and to make sure that she herself received sufficient allowances to be able to live according to her new status as queen. In the letter, Joseph tasked Strolz to deliver the money safely. In July 1812, after the Battle of Salamanca, the royal household had to evacuate Madrid, which Wellington's army entered on 12 August 1812, and set up residence at Valencia.

On 26 December 1812, the day of the first martyr of Christianity, chosen for obvious reasons, King José I made Strolz Comte de Talavera de la Reyna. With Joseph's kingdom on the brink of collapse, the King's gift was essentially a gesture of appreciation for a loyal officer and faithful friend. In fact, Strolz declined the fief that was offered him together with the honour. He, like his acquaintance Joseph Léopold Sigisbert Hugo, (Note: Joseph Léopold Sigisbert Hugo, père de Victor Hugo, qui ne fut pas titré par l'Empereur, aurait reçu un titre du roi Joseph. Aucune preuve n'en a jamais été apporté, et les divers auteurs qui font état de ce titre ne sont pas d'accord sur sa dénomination. Quoi qu'il en soit, Victor Hugo préfère ne pas passer à la postérité sous le nom de Hugo de Cogolludo, et se titre lui-même vicomte Hugo titre sous lequel, Louis-Philippe Ier, l'appel à la pairie tandis que son frère se faisait appeler le comte Hugo. Ces titres n'ont pas été portés par les descendants du poète.) never sought to have the title recognised in France.

== Return to France, service with Joseph Bonaparte until Napoleon's first abdication ==
In 1812, having suffered huge losses in Russia, Napoleon withdrew some 20,000 troops from the ongoing Peninsular War to reinforce his position in Central Europe, which left his Iberian forces weakened and vulnerable to Anglo–Spanish–Portuguese attacks. On 17 March 1813, King Joseph Bonaparte of Spain, with Strolz at his side, began his withdrawal from Spain, a clear sign of Joseph having lost control of the country. Wellington led a 123,000-strong army across northern Spain, taking Burgos in late May, and decisively defeating Jourdan at the Battle of Vitoria on 21 June 1813. Marshal Soult failed to turn the tide in his large-scale Battle of the Pyrenees (25 July to 2 August). King Joseph abdicated from the throne of Spain and returned to France; the remains of Napoleon's Peninsular Army retreated from Spain.

Strolz remained at Joseph's side as his aide-de-camp and on 1 July 1813, was theoretically reverted to his last French rank i.e. colonel, but was permitted to wear the uniform of a brigadier general. In autumn 1813, Napoleon, expecting to win the war, refused the Frankfurt proposals of the Allies that would have kept him on the throne of France as Emperor. During the last months of 1813 and early months of 1814, Wellington led the Peninsular army into southwest France and fought a number of battles against Marshals Soult and Suchet.

On 10 January 1814, Napoleon permitted his brother to continue using the title "King Joseph" together with the rank and privileges of a prince of France and accorded the rank and title of queen to Joseph's wife. Departing Paris to fight it out with the Allies, Napoleon left his brother to govern the capital, with the title Regent and Lieutenant General of the Empire, Commandant en Chef de la Garde Nationale. This meant that Joseph, with Strolz at his side as aide-de-camp, was in nominal command of the French army at the Battle of Paris. On 21 January 1814, Strolz was promoted to major general in the Imperial French Army with date of rank 1 July 1813.

In early February 1814, Napoleon fought his Six Days' Campaign, in which he won multiple battles against numerically superior enemy forces marching on Paris. Joseph, more a man of letters than a man of the sword was pessimistic nonetheless. With the prospects looking bleak, on 13 February 1814, Joseph sent Strolz on a reconnaissance mission along the Loing and Moret canals to gain information for a decision as to whether to send troops to Fontainebleau. Strolz was to rendez-vous with General Pajol who was tasked with holding the bridges of Nemours and Moret in order to block the Allies' march to Paris Strolz returned with bad news, the French line of defence was broken at Bray, the city of Sens was lost and therefore the river Yonne was indefensible, the garrisoning of the forts of Fontainebleau was therefore deemed necessary. Interestingly, it was only on 21 February 1814 (backdated to 1 July 1813) that Strolz was officially re-appointed aide de camp of Joseph Bonaparte in France, being named brigadier general at that date. Joseph evidently considered Paris as good as lost and sent Strolz to deliver orders to Field Marshals Marmont and Mortier that they should retreat to the Loire, with authorisation to parley with the Allies, namely the Russian Tsar and the Prince Schwarzenberg. For issuing these orders, many Bonapartists blamed Joseph for the Fall of Paris and thereby of the Empire. On March 30, 1814, during the Battle of Paris, with Napoleon in retreat and the fall of Paris imminent, Strolz hand delivered Joseph Bonaparte's last orders to Marechal Marmont on the Heights of Belleville. At approximately 1700hrs, Marmont sent Strolz back with a message stating that the heights could not be held for more than thirty more minutes and soon after Marmont capitulated to the Allies. When recalling that day, Strolz later had nothing but contempt and harsh words for "Princes who did nothing but use their rights to profit from the humiliation of France". After Strolz's return to Joseph's headquarters, the king and his staff and ministers left Paris and fled to St Cloud in accordance with Napoleon's orders in order to secure the protection of Empress Marie Louise and the King of Rome. With the enemy in pursuit they crossed a bridge over the Seine, had it destroyed behind them, and escaped. On 20 April 1814, Strolz was present at the abdication of Emperor Napoleon in Fontainebleau; Joseph fled to Switzerland and bought Prangins Castle near Lake Geneva where he moved his wife and family to.

== Life after the First Restoration of King Louis XVIII. ==
On 3 May 1814, King Louis XVIII entered Paris, displaying himself to his subjects in a procession through the city, and taking up residence in the Tuileries Palace the same day. He was called to the throne by Napoleon's senate on condition that he would accept a constitution that entailed recognition of the Republic and the Empire, a bicameral parliament elected every year, and the tri-colour flag of the aforementioned regimes. When confirmed, however, Louis XVIII immediately opposed the senate's constitution and accused the senate of complicity in the crimes of Bonaparte. The Great Powers occupying Paris demanded that Louis XVIII implement a constitution. Louis responded with the Charter of 1814, which disbanded the Senate but included many progressive provisions, such as freedom of religion and a legislature composed of the Chamber of Deputies, comparable to the House of Commons and the Chamber of Peers as upper house of the legislature, akin to the UK House of Lords. The move was hugely unpopular, and men like Strolz, who had chosen to remain in France when Joseph Bonaparte fled the country, were immediately sidelined.

Louis XVIII signed the Treaty of Paris on 30 May 1814. The treaty gave France her 1792 borders, which extended east of the Rhine. France had to pay no war indemnity and the occupying armies of the Sixth Coalition withdrew immediately from French soil. Strolz was put on the retirement list with the rank of lieutenant general on 10 July 1814. Not exactly a supporter of the Bourbon Kings, Strolz was nevertheless made a Chevalier de Saint Louis on 1 November 1814 during a general attempt of Louis XVIII to reconcile his regime with the elite of Napoleon's Empire and on 9 November 1814, Strolz received the decoration of Officier de la Légion d'Honneur that was granted but never formally awarded by Bonaparte.

== Hundred Days ==
After Napoleon's return from exile on the island of Elba to Paris on 20 March 1815, his brother - although surprised - joined him from Switzerland by way of Fort l'Ecluse. Joseph sent for Strolz who had been caught on the other side of France by the changed circumstances in Alsace. Unable to join Joseph immediately, he nonetheless declared his allegiance with the Bonapartes and was appointed governor of Strasbourg on 26 March 1815. On 21 April 1815, Strolz was re-confirmed by Napoleon as lieutenant general in the Imperial French Army. After lobbying for a more active role for himself, on 7 June 1815 Strolz was appointed officer commanding the 9th Cavalry Division. His division, together with the 10th Cavalry Division under General of Division Louis Pierre Aimé Chastel, and two horse artillery batteries, was part of General Rémi Joseph Isidore Exelmans II Cavalry Corps (2e Corps de cavalerie) of Napoleon's Armée du Nord. Strolz's division was formed from the 1st Cavalry Brigade under Maréchal de Camp (General de Brigade) Baron André Burthe, and the 2nd Cavalry Brigade commanded by Général de Brigade Baron Henri-Catherine-Baltazard Vincent.

=== Battle of Ligny ===
On the afternoon of 15 June 1815, Strolz's cavalry vigorously pursued the Prussian rear guard. His dragoons defeated the 6th Uhlan Regiment and chased an infantry battalion out of the woods near Gilly, Belgium. On 16 June, Exelmans' II Cavalry Corps held the right flank in Napoleon's last victory. Discovering the presence of 20,000 Prussians at Gembloux, Exelmans' cavalry commanders Jean Baptiste Alexandre Strolz and Louis Pierre Aimé Chastel were unable to interfere with their retreat on 17 June, having only 3,000 cavalry under their command.

=== Waterloo ===
During the battle of Waterloo, Strolz' 9th Cavalry Division fought at Wavre holding the extreme left flank on the west bank of the Dyle River while Chastel watched the far right flank on the east bank. There was a clash at Namur on the 20 June 1815 in which the 20th Dragoon Regiment of the II Cavalry Corps was engaged.

=== Rocquencourt and Le Chesnay ===
On 1 July 1815, Napoleon's Grande Armée fought its last battle in Rocquencourt and Le Chesnay, when Strolz's 2nd Cavalry Division, three battalions of the 44th Line Infantry Regiment, and a half battalion of the Sèvres National Guard hunted down Oberstleutnant Eston von Sohr's Prussian cavalry brigade, wrecking the 3rd Brandenburg and 5th Pommeranian Hussar Regiments. Strolz was mentioned in dispatches by General Exelmans for bravery and Leadership in the Battles of Velisy and Roquencourt

== Life after the Second Restoration of Louis XVIII. ==
After the second restoration of King Louis XVIII, Strolz, due to his closeness to the Bonapartes, was put on the retirement list at half pay on 25 July 1815 and was incarcerated as a Bonapartist during the White Terror. Strolz swore an oath of allegiance to the Bourbon King on 1 December 1816 and thereby qualified for further service while stating that "submission to the King is a necessary evil" when consulted by officers looking for future employment in the Bourbon King's army. From this time on, his name was written in most official documents in the more French-speaker friendly fashion, as "Stroltz". His transfer to the General Staff on 26 January 1820 meant a semi-reactivation. On 8 November 1820, Strolz was appointed Commandant Supérieur du Département du Finistère et de la Place de Brest. The appointment was recommended by Lieutenant General, later Marshal Jacques Lauriston, who had been called to serve as Ministre de la Maison du Roi while holding command in Brest and had nominated Strolz as his successor. Never fully trusted by the Bourbon Restauration Establishment for his Bonapartist leanings, Strolz was put on the retirement list again in January 1821.

On 21 February 1821, Strolz was received by King Louis XVIII in a private audience. Strolz settled down on a small estate in Mont-Richard, near Nancy, Alsace and bred horses. His gardens were well known and he had a reputation for the care with which he tended to swans on his ponds and storks on his grounds. It was there that Strolz was visited in May 1822 by Hercule de Serre who had been appointed Ambassador of France to the Kingdom of Naples in January of the same year and who was to be present at the Congress of Verona to negotiate among other issues, the French intervention in Spain that led to the general's reactivation.

Given his hands-on experience in Spain during the Peninsular Wars, Strolz was restored to the army for the Spanish War of 1823 and assigned to the staff of the Corps of Louis-Antoine, Duke of Angoulême, son of future King Charles X. Strolz was present at the conquest of Madrid and the Battle of Trocadéro. Evidently, he returned to France in good grace, because even though he didn't receive a command, he was rated as "à la suite", remained on the full pay list, was advanced to Commandeur de la Légion d' Honneur on 23 May 1825, and was invited to the King's Table on occasion of Charles X and the Dauphin's visit to Nancy on 15 September 1828

== Life after the July Revolution 1830 ==
After the July Revolution of 1830, the new king Louis-Philippe who ruled in an unpretentious fashion, avoiding the pomp and lavish spending of his predecessors, needed reliable men. He restored Strolz - whom he knew from two visits to Mont-Richard - to active duty on 1 September 1830 as Lieutenant General of Cavalry and Inspector General of the French Gendarmerie. The choice was supported by Field-Marshal Étienne Maurice Gérard, one of Strolz's old friends. Hugely popular in Belfort, Strolz was nominated as candidate for the parliamentary elections of 1831 and was elected Member of Parliament (Deputé) on 5 July 1831 as member of the 5th Collège du Haut-Rhin (Belfort). Strolz received 80 votes out of a total of 156 votes cast (from a pool of 171 registered voters) against 68 for his competitor, Frédéric Japy. In his much applauded maiden speech, Strolz professed his support for a representative government and for a strictly constitutional monarchy. Strolz served as a Member of Parliament, i.e. député of the Haut-Rhin region from 1831 to 1837 while remaining on active duty.

Strolz surprised the public both by speaking against the draft on several occasions, calling it an unnecessary measure in peace time, and also by taking decidedly pro-republican positions. Between 1832 and 1835 Strolz was a Member of the Parliamentary Commission for Military Pensions. He had a keen interest in historic and social topics and was selected a Corresponding Member of the Historic Institute of France, Second Class, for History of Languages and Literature (Membre Correspondant de la 2e Classe - Histoire des Langues et des Littératures of the Institut Historique of France), and on 15 January 1833 was named a Member of the Royal French Society of Universal Statistics (Socièté Francaise de Statistique Universelle-Le Roi Protecteur). In 1834, Strolz was among the first subscribers to the early social study “Christian Economic Politics or Research about the Nature and the Causes of Poverty in France and Europe” (Economie Politique Chrétienne ou Recherches sur la Nature et les Causes du Pauperisme en France et en Europe). Blessed with a well-known sense for practical solutions and a disdain for decorum, Strolz was re-elected on 21 June 1834 with 116 of 186 votes (from a pool of 213 registered voters) against his competitor M. Roman, who received 65 votes. Promoted to Grand Officier of the Légion d'Honneur on 18 August 1834, Strolz did not seek reelection in 1837, but chose to retire instead. Being less pretentious and vain than many of his contemporaries, he never made a show of his past deeds, resulting being forgotten on the widely published first list of names of generals for the Arc de Triomphe. On 5 August 1836, Strolz requested in writing, with supporting documents, that his name be put on the Arc de Triomphe in Paris. His request was granted and an apology for the oversight was issued by the committee responsible. His name can be found on column 22.

On 11 January 1837, King Louis Philippe accepted Strolz's retirement, which had been handed in on 29 December 1836. On 31 May 1839, Strolz sent a letter to the 48th Assemblée générale de l'Institut Historique to inform the president, M. le comte Le Peletier d'Aunay, that he was too sick to give an opinion on the Annuaire historique militaire of M. le capitaine Sicard. On 15 August 1839, Strolz was put on the Reserves List of the General Staff for the last time, and that same year he was created a Peer of France (Pair de France) for his services to king and nation.

== Marriage and children ==
On 28 April 1818, Strolz married Rose Eléonore Virginie Louise Boinet (born 29 November 1797 – died 4 April 1848); daughter of Messire Jean-Baptiste Sulpice Seigneur légitime de Boinet et de Brisais, commissaire des guerres en non-activité, Chevalier de l'Ordre Impérial de Léopold d'Autriche et du Mérite Militaire de Hesse and Maria-Louysa née de Keller. One of Strolz' best men was his brother Pierre François Emile de Strolz Ingénieur Royal des Ponts-et-Chaussées, who lived in Altkirch/Alsace at that time. The couple had four children who reached adulthood, two sons and two daughters. Both sons became officers, though his second son later chose a career in diplomacy.

== Death ==
Strolz died on 27 October 1841, aged 70, in his apartment at 14, Rue du Cherche-Midi, Paris. He was survived by his wife and children. Due to the very hot autumn that year, Strolz's funeral took place only two days after his death, on Friday 29 October 1841. Journalists noted that due to the very short notice, only personnel on the retirement list such as Colonel Baron Narcisee-Périclès Rigaux (son of Général Antoine Rigaux) were present and that neither the General Staff nor the Chamber of Deputies, nor the 1st Division, which had Paris in their area of responsibility, had sent a delegation or wreaths to the funeral of the man who was called the Nestor of the Generals of the French Army.

Joseph Bonaparte, when informed of the death of his former aide-de-camp, sent Strolz's widow a letter of condolences, calling him "un homme de fer et de feu, le plus fidèle parmi les fidèles" (a man of iron and fire, the most faithful among the faithful). Bonaparte arranged a wreath to be placed on the grave, and made gifts for the education of the sons and the dowries of the daughters.

Strolz is buried on the Montparnasse Cemetery, in Paris (14ème). His grave is at Division 15, avenue de l’Ouest, 2ème ligne.

== Distinctions ==
- Strolz is one of 660 Officers who had their names engraved on the Arc de Triomphe in Paris. His name can be found on column 22.
- In Belfort (90000), his native city, a street is named after him, the "Rue du Général Strolz".
- On the house 5, Rue de l'Etuve in Belfort, a plaque of the Souvenir Français commemorates Strolz' place of birth.
- Chevalier de la Légion d' Honneur (5 germinal an XI) (25 March 1804) (registration number 13446).
- Knight of the Order of the Iron Crown Kingdom of Italy (6 June 1805).
- Knight of the Papal Order of the Golden Spur and Comte palatin de l'eglise de Saint-Jean du Latran (2 February 1807).
- Commandeur de l'Ordre des Deux Siciles (19 May 1808).
- Grand-Croix de l'Ordre Royal d’Espagne (18 June 1810).
- Grand-Cordon de l'Ordre Royal d'Espagne (15 February 1811).
- Chevalier de Saint Louis (1 November 1814).
- Officier de la Légion d'honneur (9 November 1814).
- Commandeur de la Légion d' Honneur (23 May 1825).
- Grand Officier de la Légion d'Honneur (18 April 1834).

== Dates of rank and promotions, activities ==
- March 1790 Volunteer Aide-de-Camp (engagé volontaire) to Général de Ferrier du Chatelet, general officer commanding all regular and volunteer troops in the Belfort region.
- 08 April 1793, chasseur à cheval (1st Régiment de Chasseurs á Cheval).
- 22 September 1794, brevet lieutenant and aide de camp to General Kléber.
- 26 December 1795, commissioned as a lieutenant in the 16th Régiment de Chasseurs à Cheval, described by Kléber as a patriotic, capable and courageous citizen, recommended for further promotion.
- 24 May 1797 (5 Prairial V), rated as an excellent horseman, courageous man and very intelligent officer and aide de camp by General Francois-Joseph Lefebre (1755–1820)).
- 02 January 1798, aide de camp to General Hatry.
- 23 June 1798, captain, 16th Régiment de Chasseurs à Cheval.
- 21 January 1799, major (Chef d’Escadron) (16th Régiment de Chasseurs à Cheval).
- 29 October 1803, (6 Brumaire XII), major (=lieutenant colonel) (19th Régiment de Chasseurs à Cheval)
- Deputy Chief of Staff of Napoleon's Italian Army (Sous-chef de l'état major general de l'Armée d'Italy).
- 29 October 1805, battlefield promotion to full colonel at Verona.
- 02 December 1805, takes part in the Battle of Austerlitz, receives thirteen lance wounds in a charge, survives.
- December 1805, appointed adjutant general by Joseph Bonaparte
- 25 July 1806, appointed to the personal staff of Joseph Bonaparte, now King Joseph of Naples, tasked with organising and commanding the Regiment des Chevaux Légers of the Royal Guards.
- 1807, appointed Governor of the Basilicate Province, tasked with fighting insurgents loyal to disposed King Ferdinand.
- 30 October 1807, promoted to brigadier general in the Army of the Royaume des Deux Siciles.
- 20 May 1808, grand squire and aide de camp of King Joseph of Naples.
- July 1808, transferred to the service of Joseph Bonaparte's Kingdom of Spain.
- 12 July 1808, enters Madrid with King Joseph, has to cover the king's retreat from the city on 29 July 1808.
- 08 November 1808, cited for bravery in the Battle of Espinosa de los Monteros by Napoleon.
- 22–28 July 1809, battle of Talavera de La Reyna, CO of a cavalry brigade, cited for bravery.
- 09 August 1809, battle of Almonacid.
- 11 September 1809, receives a gift of two million Reals from King Joseph.
- 15 June 1810, baron of the French Empire (Letters patent of 15 June 1810).
- 15 February 1811, lieutenant général in the Army of the Kingdom of Spain as marechal de camp et premier ecuyer du Roi.
- 06 September 1812, named together with Comte Melito and Generals Merlin and Lucotte as the men who in July 1812 favoured the support of the Armée de Portugal.
- 26 December 1812, created Comte de Talavera de la Reyna by King Joseph.
- 01 July 1813, returned to France with King Joseph, reverted to last French rank i.e. brigadier general, Spanish titles never recognized.
- 21 Janvier 1814, confirmed as major general in the Imperial French Army with date of rank 1 July 1813.
- 13 February 1814, reconnaissance mission for Joseph Bonaparte along the Loing and Moret canals to rendezvous with General Pajol and gain information for a decision to send troops to Fontainebleau.
- 13 February 1814, returns with bad news, line broken at Bray, Sens lost, defence of Fontainebleau necessary.
- 21 February 1814, officially re-appointed aide de camp of Joseph Bonaparte in France and named brigadier general, back-dated to 1 July 1813.
- 21 February 1814, Strolz appoints Capitain Jean Thomas Rocquancourt as his aide de camp.
- 30 March 1814, hand delivers Joseph Bonaparte's last Orders to Marechal Marmont on the Hauteurs de Belleville during the Battle of Paris.
- 20 April 1814, present at the abdication of Emperor Napoleon in Fontainebleau.
- 10 July 1814, put on the retirement list with the rank of lieutenant general.
- 26 March 1815, appointed Governor of Strasbourg by Napoleon.
- 21 April 1815, confirmed by Napoleon as lieutenant general in the Imperial French Army.
- 07 June 1815, appointed officer commanding 9th Cavalry Division.
- 01 July 1815, cited by General Excelmans for bravery and Leadership in the Battles of Velisy and Roquencourt.
- 25 July 1815, put on the retirement list at half pay.
- 1815, incarcerated as a Bonapartist during the White Terror.
- 26 January 1820, transferred to the General Staff.
- 08 November 1820, commandant supérieur du département du Finistère et de la place de Brest with Rocquancourt as his aide de camp.
- 31 January 1821, put on the Retirement List.
- 1823, restored to the active list for the Spanish War of 1823, assigned to the staff of the corps of Louis-Antoine, Duke of Angoulême, son of future King Charles X, present at the conquest of Madrid and the Battle of Trocadéro.
- 15 September 1828, invited to the King's Table on the occasion of the visit of Charles X and the Dauphin to Nancy.
- 01 September 1830, reactivated as lieutenant general of cavalry
- 05 July 1832, Inspector general of the French gendarmerie of the 3e, 6e, and 16e divisions militaires Metz, Strasbourg, Lille.
- 1831–37, Member of Parliament (Député) for the Haut-Rhin region.
- 1832–1835, Member of the Parliamentary Commission for Military Pensions.
- 1833, Institut Historique, Membre Correspondant de la 2e Classe - Histoire des langues et des littératures.
- 1834, First Subscriber of Economie Politique Chrétienne ou Recherches sur la Nature et les Causes du Pauperisme en France et en Europe.
- 05 August 1836, Strolz requests that his name is put on the Arc de Triomphe in Paris.
- 11 January 1837, King Louis Philippe accepts Strolz's retirement handed in on 29 December 1836.
- 15 August 1839, put on the Reserves List of the General Staff, made Pair de France for his services to king and nation.

== Bibliography ==
- Baradel, Yvette, Bischoff, Georges, Larger, André, Pagnot, Yves, Rilliot, Michel: Histoire de Belfort, Horvath, 1985,
- Bonnart, Médard, Capitaine de Gendarmerie, en retraite, Chevalier des Ordres Royaux et Militaires de Saint-Louis et de la Légion-d'Honneur, : Histoire Vol. 2, Fiévet, Epernai, 1828. p. 366, ISBN 978-1272286187
- Bulletin des Lois du Royaume de France IX Série, Tome 14* Chuquet, Arthur: Ordres et Apostilles de Napoleon 1799–1815, Tome IV, Paris 1912
- Choffat, Thierry, Thiébaud, Jean-Marie, Tissot-Robbe, Gérard: Les Comtois de Napoléon: cent destins au service de l'Empire, Editions Cabedita, 2006, ISBN 978-2882954787
- Connelly, Owen: Napoleon's Satellite Kingdoms, Free Press, 1969
- Desormeaux, Baguenier H.: Kléber en Vendee, Documents, publies pour la Société d' Histoire Contemporaire, Picard, Paris 1907, p. 24
- Dobson, W. (Ed.): The Life of Napoleon Bonaparte, Late Emperor of the French, from his Birth to his Departure to the Island of Saint Helena, Philadelphia, 1815, p. 168, ISBN 978-1236091406
- Fastes de la Légion d'Honneur, Biographie de tous les Décorés, Tome Quatrième, Paris 1844
- Fauvelet de Bourrienne, Louis : Memoirs of Napoleon Bonaparte, Band 1–4, Silverthorne 2009
- Fourier, Charles: La Phalange: journal de la Science Sociale Découverte et Constituée, 3e Serie, Tome IV, Paris Septembre-Décembre 1841
- Franklin, John, Embleton, Gerry A.: Waterloo (2), Ligny, Osprey Publishing, Oxford, 2015, ISBN 978-1472803665
- Fromageot, Paul: La Rue du Cherche-Midi et ses habitants depuis ses origins jusqu'a nos jours, Firmin-Didot, Paris 1915, p. 253
- Gazeta del Gobierno 1809 y Suplemento a la Gazeta del Gobierno del Martes 5 de Diciembrie de 1809
- Grandmaison Geoffroy de: L' Espagne et Napoléon 1809–1811, Paris 1925, ISBN 978-2013485555
- Haythornthwaite, Philipp J.: Waterloo Armies, Men, Organization, Tactics, Bemsley Pen and Sword Military, 2007, p. 138, ISBN 978-1844155996
- Hugo, Abel: Souvenirs et mémoires sur Joseph Bonaparte, in: Revue des Deux Mondes, Période Initiale, 2e série, tome 1, 1833, pp. 300–2, ASIN: B00JSA21AU
- Iung, Th.: Bonaparte et son Temps, 4e Edition, Tome 4, Paris 1889
- Jourdan, Jean Baptiste: Mémoires militaires du maréchal Jourdan (guerre d'Espagne), récrits par lui-même / publiés d'après le manuscrit original par M. le vicomte de Grouchy. Paris, Flammarion, [1899] xii, ISBN 978-1149468951
- Journal de Paris, Mardi 26. Juillet 1808, No 208.
- Journal des Travaux de la Société Francaise de Statistique Universelle - Le Roi Protecteur, Vol III, No 8, Fevrier 1833
- Largeaud, Jean-Marc: Napoléon et Waterloo: La Défaite glorieuse de 1815 à nos jours, Boutique de l'Histoire, 2006
- Le Clere: L'Ami de la Religion et du Roi Paris 1820* Michel, P.: Biographie Historique des Hommes Marquants de l'Ancienne Provence de Lorraine, (pp. 490–91)
- Le Général Baron Jean-Baptiste-Alexandre Strolz in: Bulletin de la Société belfortaine d'émulation, Belfort 1912
- Leuilliot, Paul: L'Alsace au début du XIXe siecle: Essais d'Histoire Politique, Economique et Religieuse, 1815–1830, Tome 1, Sevpen 1959
- Librairie administrative de Paul Dupont, 1889 Paris 1889
- Liste des Mandats à l'Assemblée nationale ou à la Chambre des députés
- Reiss René : Clarke: Maréchal et Pair de France, Coprur, 1999
- Robert, Adolphe, Bourloton, Edgar, Cougny, Gaston: Dictionnaire des Parlementaires Français, Bourloton (ed.), Paris 1889, p. 414
- Sitzmann, Édouard: Dictionnaire de Biographie des Hommes Célèbres de l'Alsace : Depuis les temps les plus reculés jusqu'à nos jours, Tome II, Rixheim (Alsace) 1910
- Schouler Georges, Richardot René: Belfort: Territoire de Belfort, Editions S.A.E.P, 1972.
- Six, Georges (1934). "Strolz (Jean-Baptiste-Alexandre)". Dictionnaire biographique des généraux et amiraux français de la Révolution et de l'Empire: 1792–1814 (in French). Vol. 2. Paris: Librairie Historique et Nobilaire. pp. 479–480.
- Thiers, Adolphe: Historical Works, Vol. III, History of the French Consulate and Empire 1807-1812 translated by Thomas Redhead et al. (p. 417)
- Tresch, Pirmin : Histoire de Masevaux: Abbaye et Sanctuaires, Oberlin, Strasbourg 1987
- Vaulabelle, Achille Tenaille de: Histore des deux restaurations jusqu'à l'avènement de Louis Philippe, Toisième edition, Tome III, Paris 1857
- Villeneuve-Bargemont, Alban de: Economie Politique Chrétienne ou Recherches sur la Nature et les Causes du Pauperisme en France et en Europe, Paris 1834
- Voyage du Roi dans les Départements de l'Est, Imprimerie Royale, Paris 1828
