= Emília Viotti da Costa =

Brazilian historian

- Born: 28 February 1928; São Paulo, Brazil
- Died: 2 November 2017 (aged 89); São Paulo
- Education: University of São Paulo
- Occupation: Historian
- Known for: Her work on Brazilian history
- Notable work: Da Senzala à Colônia (From the slaves to the colony)

Emília Viotti da Costa (1928 – 2017) was a Brazilian historian and professor, known particularly for her work on slavery and abolition. Sacked from her job as a professor at the University of São Paulo by the military dictatorship in Brazil, she lived in the United States between 1973 and 1999, where she became an emeritus professor at Yale University.

== Early life ==
Emília Viotti da Costa was born in São Paulo on 28 February 1928. Her father was Portuguese, having emigrated to Brazil at a young age as an orphan. Her mother was Brazilian, coming from a political, business and artistic background. Her grandfather had been president of the provinces of Paraná, and Maranhão and also a state senator in São Paulo state. Her great-great-grandmother was an American who had lived in the Azores. Costa completed her undergraduate degree in history and geography at the University of São Paulo (USP) in 1951. Between 1951 and 1953 she took a course in Medieval, Modern and Contemporary History at the Faculdade de Filosofia, Ciências e Letras (FFCL) in Ituverava, São Paulo state. In 1953 and 1954, she received a French government scholarship to study at the École pratique des hautes études in France. Her teachers were Georges Gurvitch, Paul Leuilliot and Ernest Labrousse. On her return to Brazil she worked at USP.

== Career ==
After receiving a PhD and becoming a professor in 1964, Costa lectured at USP until 1969 when she was sacked as a result of the intervention of the military dictatorship. After delivering a lecture on the topic of "The Crisis of the University" and debating the same subject in a television programme with the Minister of Education, Tarso Dutra, she was arrested in 1969, along with other colleagues, and subsequently compulsorily retired from the USP under Brazil's Institutional Act Number Five (AI-5). There was strong resistance to the regime in universities, particularly against attempts to introduce university reform in 1968. In 1973 she moved to the United States where, until 1999, she was professor of Latin American history at Yale University, receiving the title of professor emeritus. She also taught at Tulane University in New Orleans and at the University of Illinois Urbana-Champaign. Returning to Brazil in 1999 she became part of the advisory board of USP and professor emeritus in the Faculty of Philosophy, Literature and Human Sciences.

== Publications ==
Costa was the author of six books:

- Da Monarquia à República - momentos decisivos (From the Monarchy to the Republic – Decisive Moments). Published by São Paulo State University, Unesp, 1989. This analyses the process leading up to the First Brazilian Republic in an attempt to understand the subsequent marginalization of broad sectors of the Brazilian population.
- Da Senzala à Colônia (From the slaves to the colony), Unesp, 1966 and revised in 1982. This book addresses the transition from slave to free labour in the coffee-growing area of São Paulo and is considered a mandatory reference for scholars of the period.
- A Abolição (The Abolition), Unesp, 1982.
- Coroas de glória, lágrimas de sangue (Crowns of glory, tears of blood – the Demerara Slave Rebellion), Companhia das Letras, 1994/1998. This reconstructs one of the greatest slave revolts, which took place in British Guiana (now Guyana) in 1823.
- O Supremo Tribunal Federal e a Construção da Cidadania (The Supreme Court and the construction of citizenship), Unesp, 2001
- The Brazilian Empire, University of North Carolina.

== Death ==
Costa died in São Paulo on 2 November 2017, of multiple organ failure. Her intellectual estate is held by the Unidade Especial Informação e Memória and consists of 387 books, collections of 8 periodicals, and other documents.
