= Michel Ordener =

General of division and commander in Napoleon's elite Imperial Guard (1755–1811)

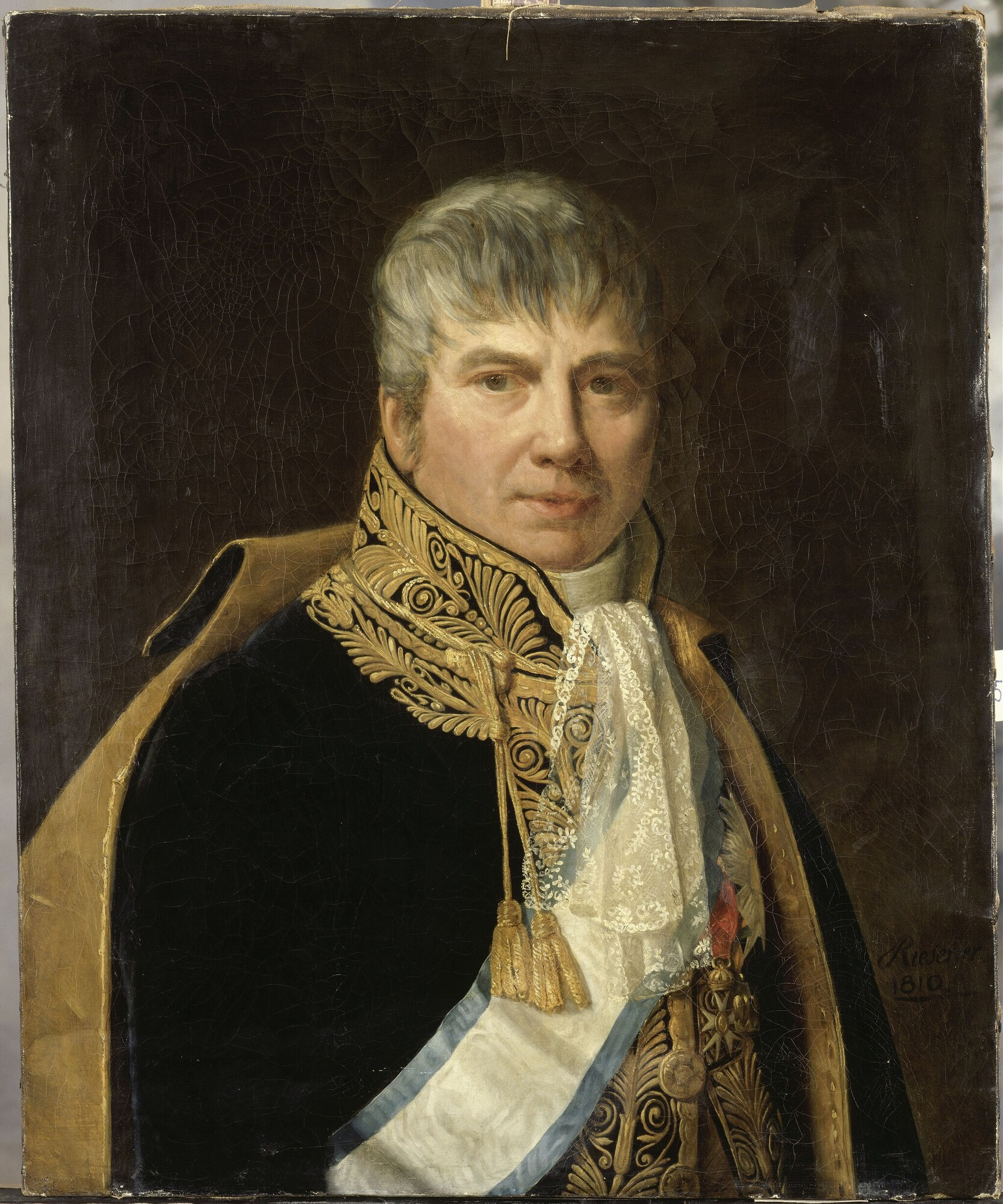
- Portrait by Henri-François Riesener
- Born: 2 September 1755; L'Hôpital, Lorraine, France
- Died: 30 August 1811 (aged 55) Compiegne, France
- Allegiance: Kingdom of France; Kingdom of the French; First French Republic; First French Empire
- Service years: 1776–1811
- Rank: General of Division
- Commands: Horse Grenadiers of the Imperial Guard
- Conflicts: French Revolutionary Wars; Upper Danube Campaign; Napoleonic Wars; Battle of Austerlitz
- Awards: Grand Officer of the Legion d’Honneur; Order of the Iron Crown; Count of the Empire
- Other work: Senator, First Equerry to the Empress, Governor of the Imperial Palace at Compiegne

Michel, comte Ordener (French pronunciation: [miʃɛl ɔʁdənɛːʁ]; 2 September 1755 – 30 August 1811) was a French general of division and a commander in Napoleon's elite Imperial Guard. Of plebeian origins, he was born in L'Hôpital and enlisted as private at the age of 18 years in the Prince Condé's Legion. He was promoted through the ranks; as warrant officer of a regiment of Chasseurs à Cheval, he embraced the French Revolution in 1789. He advanced quickly through the officer ranks during the French Revolutionary Wars.

In 1804, Ordener organized and led the controversial kidnapping of the Duke d'Enghien. In 1805, he commanded a regiment of the Imperial Guard cavalry at several important battles, including the Battle of Austerlitz; although he led an energetic and opportune charge, Napoleon noted that Ordener seemed tired and predicted that the general would last only five or six years more. Ordener participated in one more campaign and then accepted a post in the Senate. Napoleon appointed him as Josephine Bonaparte's equerry, supervising the care and maintenance of her horses. He followed this with the post as governor of the Emperor's household in Compiegne, where Ordener died on 30 August 1811.

== Career ==
Although little is known of Ordener's youth, he was the son of commoners and joined the legion of the Prince of Conde (cousin to the king) at the age of 18 (1776). He was assigned as a private of the Boufflers Dragoons, part of this legion. In 1783, he was appointed to the quartermaster corps and in 1787, he was promoted to warrant officer. In the early days of the French Revolution, he adopted its principles with zeal and enthusiasm.

Subsequently, Ordener took part in all the French Revolutionary Wars. In the War of the First Coalition, he served with distinction in the armies of the Moselle, the Rhine, the Danube and in northern Italy. He was promoted to lieutenant in the 10th Regiment Chasseurs à Cheval (light horse) on 25 January 1792 and captain the following year. In 1796 he was promoted to chef de brigade of the 10th Regiment. At the Battle of Lodi, in northern Italy, despite the ravaging fire of Austrian cannons, Ordener held the famous bridge until the arrival of Napoleon with the rest of the army. Ordener crossed the Adda river with a brigade to encircle and envelope the Austrians at the Battle of Pavia. Afterward, he helped to take Milan.

At the onset of the War of the Second Coalition in 1799, when the armies of the Danube and Helvetia were formed, he was assigned to the Army of the Danube under command of Jean Baptiste Jourdan. His 10th Regiment was part of Laurent de Gouvion Saint-Cyr's III. Division, and held the far left flank at the Battle of Ostrach, 21 March 1799, in southwestern Germany. Although he was wounded on 14 August 1799 in Switzerland, he participated in the Second Battle of Zurich in which his 10th Chasseurs à Cheval routed a division of Russians, a decisive moment in the French victory. Ordener was promoted to colonel of the regiment in 1801 and on 29 August 1803, he was promoted to general of brigade.

=== Duke d'Enghien affair ===
On Napoleon's orders, Ordener entered into the most controversial action of his career, leading a raid into the sovereign Margraviate of Baden to arrest Louis Antoine, Duke of Enghien, in 1804. Napoleon's orders were specific: Ordener and Armand Augustin Caulaincourt were to take 300 dragoons into the duchy, surround the village of Ettenheim, where the Duke lived, arrest the Duke and Charles Francois Dumouriez, who Napoleon believed was present, and bring both of the men back to France. Ordener and Caulaincourt were instructed also to take their own provisions and to inflict neither harm nor damage on any of the duchy's inhabitants or their property. In the night of 14–15 March, the dragoons crossed the Rhine and surrounded the Duke's lodgings. Dumouriez was not there, nor had he been, but they kidnapped the Duke and took him away to France. Within a few days, the Duke was spirited into the Chateau de Vincennes, on the outskirts of Paris. There he was tried for treason and executed immediately after the verdict. This action, which involved the invasion of a sovereign state, the kidnapping of a duke and a sham trial for treason followed by the man's immediate execution, had political and diplomatic repercussions throughout Europe.

=== Campaigns in Austria and Prussia ===
In 1805, Ordener participated in the campaign against Austria as commander of a regiment of horse grenadiers of the Imperial Guard. At the Battle of Austerlitz, he led a decisive and energetic charge. He executed this, upon order of Napoleon, with impetuosity; this was the charge that pushed the Russians onto the ice and during which, French sources maintain, 40,000 Russians drowned and another 30,000 were taken prisoner. Although this charge garnered for Ordener his promotion to general of division, Napoleon commented that Ordener was worn out. He followed this observation with the frequently quoted prediction, "I think we have no more than five or six years left of him."

In the 1806 campaign against Prussia, Ordener commanded a division of the elite Imperial Guard cavalry. After this campaign, he became a senator and was appointed to first equerry to the Empress Josephine. In this responsibility, he supervised the care of the empress's horses, and acted as her senior aid. Michel Ordener's daughter, Josephine-Eugenie Ordener, was one of Josephine Bonaparte's ladies-in-waiting. He also received the Order of the Iron Crown.

In December 1808, Ordener was raised to Count of the Empire by Napoleon. The following year, Napoleon nominated him as governor for the imperial Château of Compiegne, where he died in 1811 of an attack of apoplexy. He is buried at the Panthéon. François Joseph Lefebvre, Duke of Danzig, another of Napoleon's generals of plebeian origins and with whom Ordener had developed a long-standing friendship, gave the eulogy:

"It is not because of simple regrets and because of honorable mourning that we must recognize the services of a warrior who has dedicated his whole life to his fatherland and his prince. Let us give public testimony to his virtues, to his merit, to all the qualities that have made him esteemed by the Emperor and that have rendered him dear to his friends and to his family. Let us praise him today at least, because his modesty can no longer prevent us, and let us not fear to offend a virtue that he has loved so much during his life."

== Family ==
Michel Ordener married Madeleine-Françoise Walter while he served in the quartermaster corps. They had two children, a daughter mentioned above, and a son. The son, also named Michel, was born in Huningue, on 2 (or 3) April 1787 and attended the special military academy at Metz from which he graduated on 8 December 1803 with the grade of sous-lieutenant (second lieutenant) and an assignment to the 24th Regiment of Dragoons. He also took part in the expedition to Spain and the subsequent invasion of Portugal in 1808. He was promoted to colonel and chef de brigade of the 30th Regiment of Dragoons. The Dragoons received battle honors for their participation at the Battle of Borodino. He was wounded on 28 November 1812 in the withdrawal from Russia, at the Battle of Berezina, and again prior to Napoleon's abdication, at the Battle of Montmartre. He later fought at the Battle of Waterloo. Despite his record in the Napoleonic wars and his father's common origins, he remained at his rank of colonel at the Bourbon Restoration, was confirmed as the second Count Ordener, and was acknowledged as a Knight of the Order of Saint Louis. Michel Ordener Jr., married Marie-Francoise-Pauline Legouis in 1829 and died in 1875.
