= Mounted Grenadiers of the Imperial Guard =

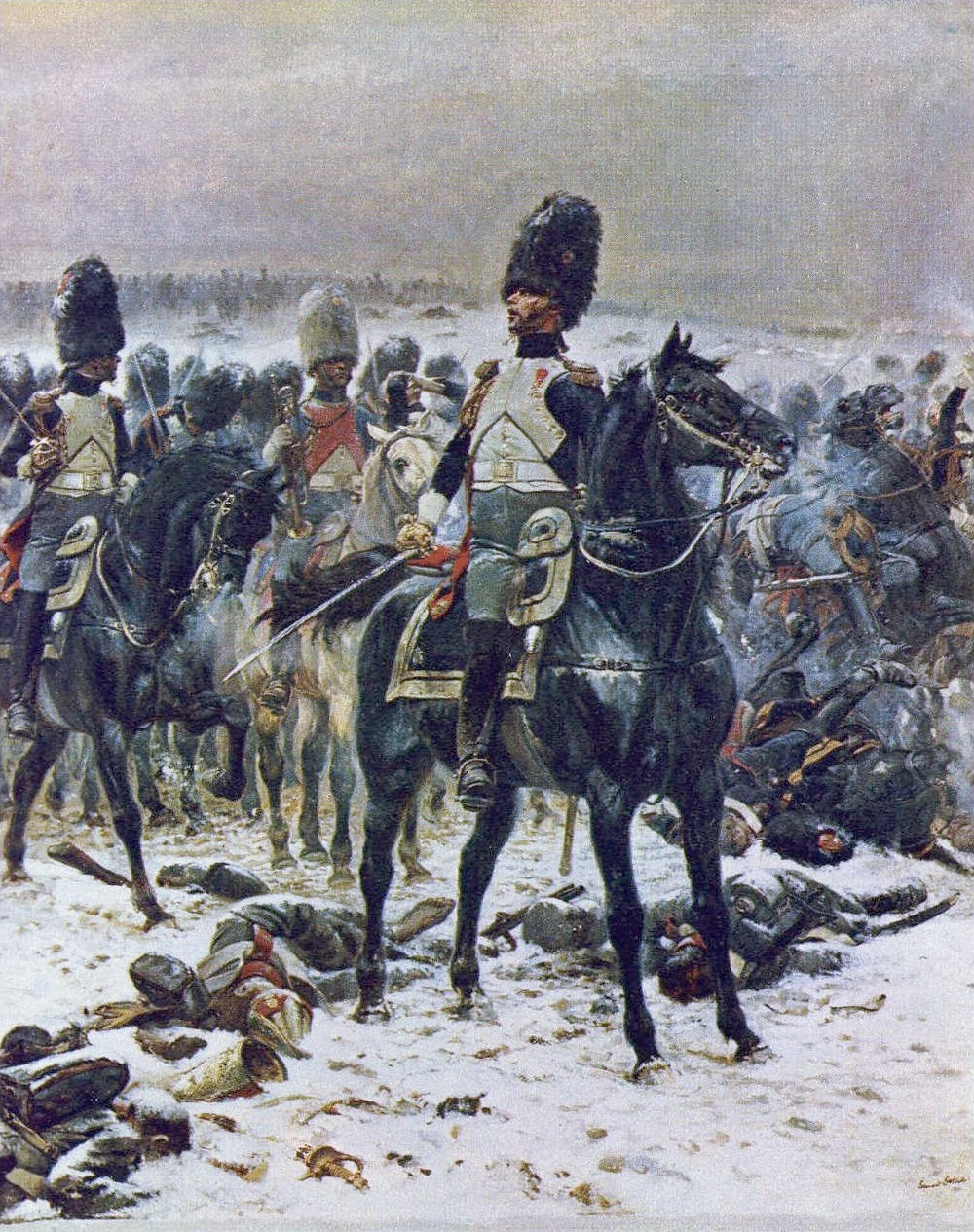
- The regiment at the Battle of Eylau
- Active: 1797–1814; 1815
- Country: First French Empire
- Branch: French Imperial Army
- Type: Heavy cavalry
- Size: Regiment
- Part of: Imperial Guard
- Headquarters & Dépôt: École Militaire, Paris
- Nickname: Les chevaux noirs de Bessières (Bessières' dark horses)
- Engagements: Marengo, Austerlitz, Eylau, Essling, Wagram, Dresden, Leipzig, Hanau, La Rothière, Champaubert, Montmirail, Château-Thierry, Vauchamps, Reims, Craonne, Méry-sur-Seine, Waterloo

Commanders
- Notable commanders: Jean-Baptiste Bessières; Michel Ordener; Frédéric Henri Walther; Claude Étienne Guyot; Louis Lepic (second-in-command)

The Mounted Grenadiers of the Imperial Guard (French: Grenadiers à Cheval de la Garde Impériale) was a heavy cavalry regiment in the Consular, then Imperial Guard during the French Consulate and First French Empire respectively. They were the senior Old Guard cavalry regiment of the Imperial Guard and from 1806 were brigaded together with the Dragoons of the Imperial Guard.

A part of the Republican Consular Guard, the Grenadiers became the senior "Old Guard" heavy cavalry regiment when the Imperial Guard was founded, in 1804. Their maximum official complement was just over 1100 officers and troopers, commanded by a general of division or a seasoned general of brigade, with some of the most famous cavalrymen of the time as commander.

Rarely committed to battle during the Napoleonic Wars, they were usually kept in reserve, alongside the Emperor, during the most significant battles. When sent into action, such as during the battles of Marengo, Austerlitz, Eylau, Hanau or Waterloo, as well as during a number of actions of 1814, results were usually impressive. The regiment was disbanded in 1815, after Napoleon's downfall and the second restoration of the Bourbons.

== Origins and organisation ==
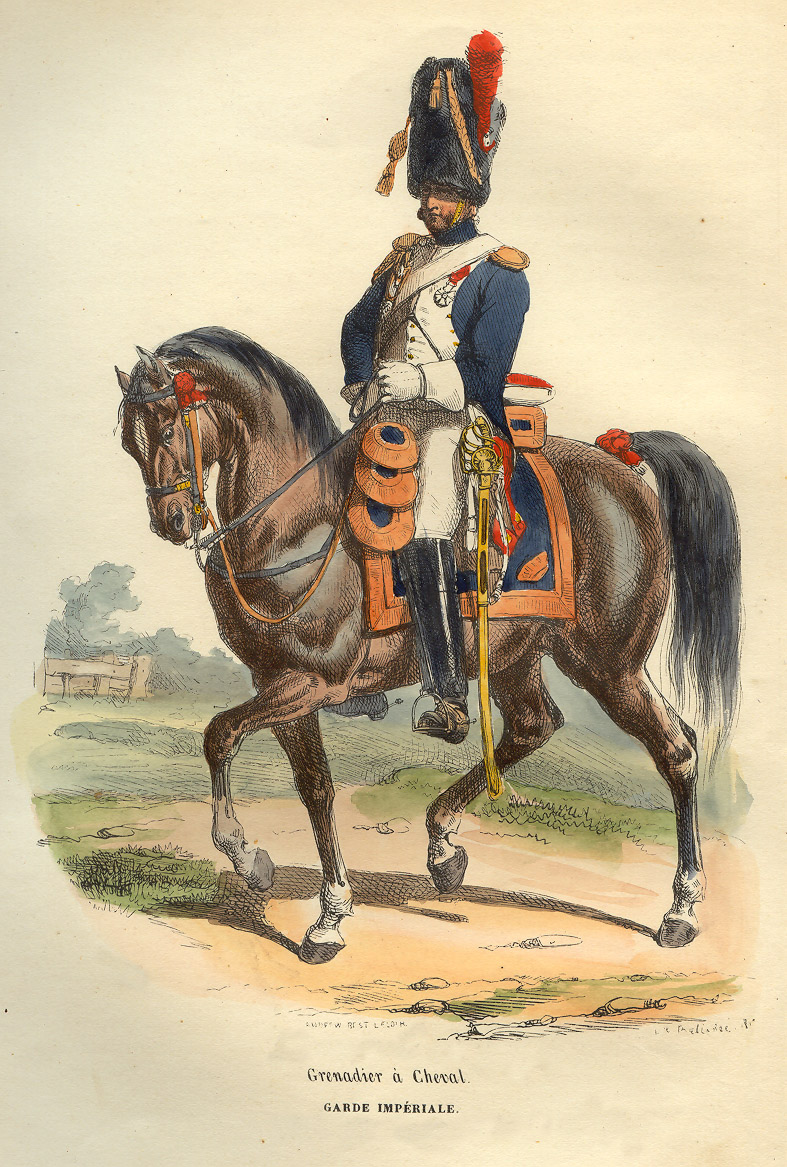
A Horse Grenadier

The origins of the Guard Horse Grenadiers dated back to the Constitution of the Year III, which provided for the organisation of a guard for the French Directory. Within this guard, a cavalry regiment was formed and most cavalrymen were drawn from the 9th dragoons. However, the horse guards would only take service in 1796 and a 1797 regulation stated that the guards were to be called 'grenadiers'. The next major reorganisation came with the French Consulate, just days after the Coup of 18 Brumaire. This reorganisation reshuffled the general staff of the regiment and gave its command to chef de brigade (colonel) Michel Ordener, assisted by three chefs d'escadron (squadron commanders). Further reorganisations in 1801 and 1802 were conducted under the supervision of General Jean-Baptiste Bessières, bringing the regiment to four squadrons of two companies each and integrating it in the newly created Consular Guard, with the general staff of the regiment also expanded.

On May 18, 1804, with the creation of the Imperial Guard, the horse grenadier regiment was integrated in this newly created unit. A decree from July of that year stated that the general staff of the regiment was to be extended to 32 men and that the regiment would be organised in four squadrons of two companies each, with 123 men in each company, for a total of 1016 officers and men. The next year, two squadrons of vélites, totaling 800 men were added, as well as a major en second (deputy commander). The two vélite squadrons would only be disbanded in August 1811, with the men being reshuffled in a 5-squadron regiment, totaling 1250 men. A further reorganisation was operated just before the Russian campaign, bringing the number of squadrons back down to four. In January 1813, after the Russian disaster, the regiment was once again reorganised, with the addition of a fifth and then a sixth squadron of 2 companies each. These two squadrons were both considered Young Guard and were also known as the 2nd Grenadiers à Cheval regiment. Throughout the War of the Sixth Coalition the regiment would fight in this format, with each of the four Old Guard squadrons being formed of 2 companies, 124 officers and men each.

Following the abdication of the Emperor Napoleon I in 1814, the restored Bourbons planned to erase the identity of this regiment by asking Marshal Michel Ney to disband and then reorganise the men into a new regiment called cuirassiers de France (cuirassiers of France), which included 4 squadrons. The men that had formed the original 6th Young Guard squadron were apparently all transferred to the Carabiniers-à-Cheval. With the comeback of Napoleon during the Hundred Days, the regiment was once again transformed into the Horse Grenadiers of the Imperial Guard and after the fall of Napoleon, the regiment was permanently disbanded on November 25, 1815.

== Commanders ==
The Grenadiers à Cheval regiment was commanded by a general of division, who had the title of colonel commandant (colonel commander), assisted by a brigadier general, who had the title of colonel-major (colonel major), also called major en premier (first major), himself assisted by a general or colonel, with the title of major en second (second major). Pigeard offers a complete table of the regiment's commanders:

Function	Colonel commander	Colonel-major	Second major
Rank	General of division	Brigadier general	Brigadier general or Colonel
General Officers	Bessières (December 1799-July 1800); Ordener (July 1800-May 1806); Walther (May 1806-November 1813); Guyot (November 1813 - November 1815)	Oulié; Lepic; Laferrière-Lévesque; Jamin de Bermuy	Chastel; Exelmans; Castex

On July 18, 1800, as Bessières was called to take overall command of the entire Consular Guard Cavalry, the seasoned Colonel Ordener took command of the horse grenadier regiment, a command which the latter would keep until May 20, 1806, when he retired from active service. In 1806, with the creation of a second heavy cavalry regiment in the Guard, the 'Dragoons of the Empress', a heavy cavalry brigade was formed and put under the command of a general of division. The command would be given to a senior cavalryman, General Frédéric Henri Walther, a veteran of the French Revolutionary Wars, who would command the unit until his death, on November 24, 1813. His successor would be 45-year-old Claude-Étienne Guyot, who would command the brigade until the fall of the Empire in July 1815. During this period, the most remarkable commander of the regiment would be the battle-hardened Louis Lepic, commanding as colonel-major.

== Battles ==
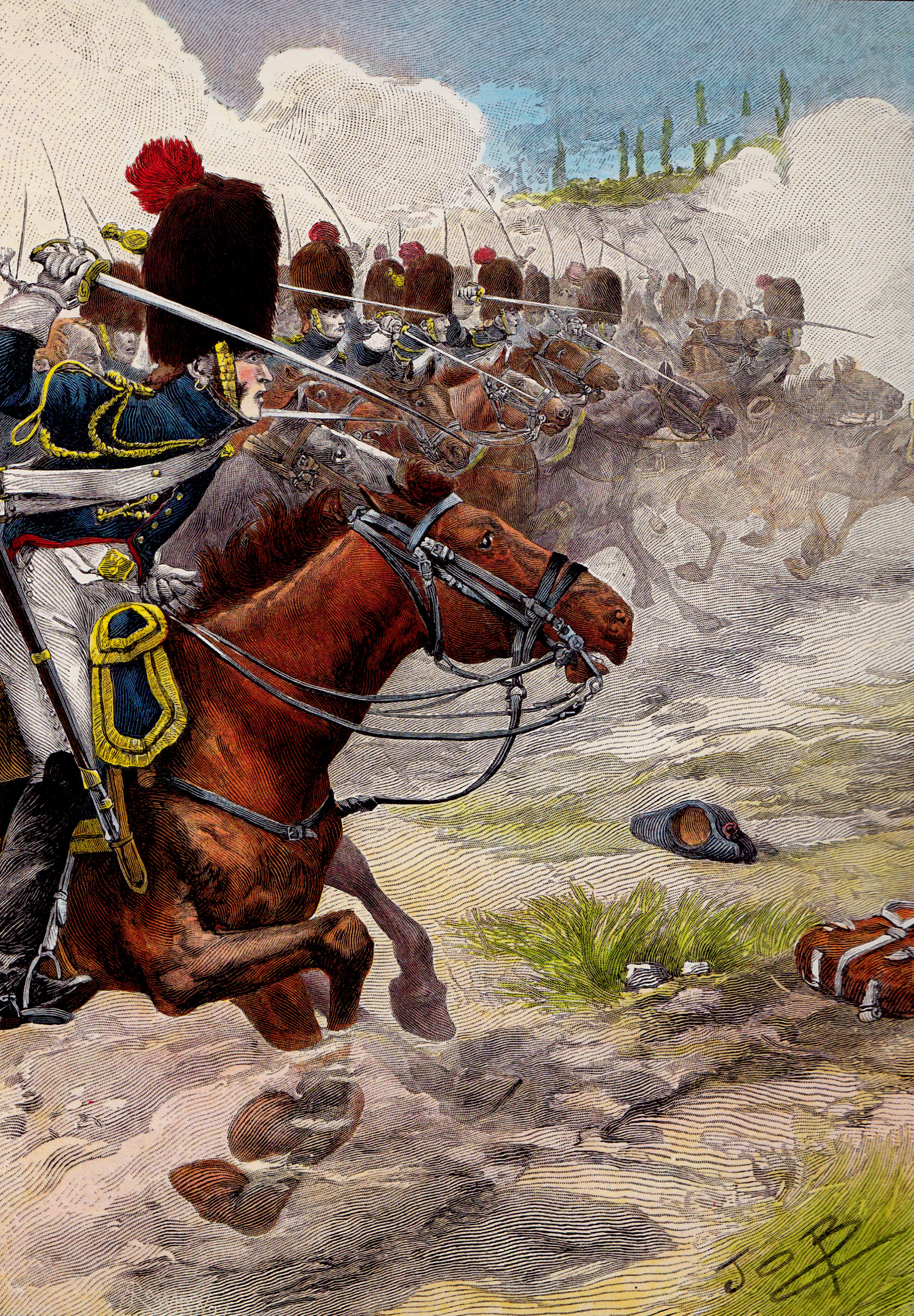
Charge of the Grenadiers à cheval at Marengo, 1800.

=== War of the Second Coalition ===
The first true engagement of the unit took place in dramatic circumstances during the War of the Second Coalition, at Marengo. As First Consul Napoleon Bonaparte was losing the battle against the Austrians, Louis Desaix's French division appeared on the field of battle. As Desaix's men charged, two separate cavalry charges helped change the course of the battle: Kellermann's brigade deployed skillfully on the Austrian right, before charging and breaking everything in its way, and on the Austrian left Bessières organised a massive charge with the whole Consular Guard cavalry and increased the panic and rout of the enemy troops. Following the battle, Bessières received high praise for his actions from the First Consul, who said to the general: "Under your command, the Guard covered itself with glory; it could not have performed better under the given circumstances." Little over a month after the battle, the command of the regiment was taken by Lorainer colonel Michel Ordener.

=== War of the Third Coalition ===
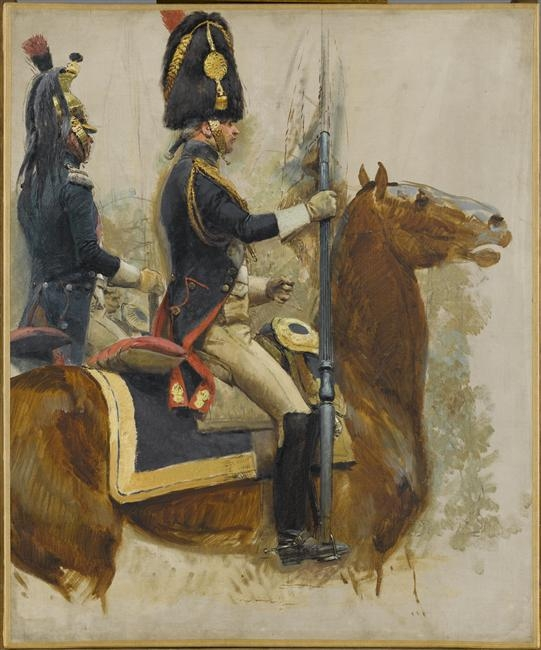
Grenadier à cheval officer (front)

Five years would pass before the grenadiers' next engagement, which occurred during the War of the Third Coalition. As war broke out with Russia and Austria, the horse grenadiers, now a part of the Imperial Guard, crossed the Rhine into Germany on October 1, 1805. Ten days after that, they were at Augsburg and on October 20 they were present at the surrender of Ulm. They would see their only major action during this campaign on December 2, on the Pratzen plateau, at the Battle of Austerlitz. During this battle, Napoleon had planned to break the Austro-Russian centre and thus split their forces. The plan was well under way towards mid morning but a potentially dangerous situation for the French occurred when the Russian Imperial Guard under Grand Duke Constantine arrived and attacked the French from Vandamme's division around Stary Vinohrady ('the old vineyards'). At first, one battalion of the French 4th Line regiment was caught in an awkward position and broken by the Russian Guard cavalry supported by artillery, with the French battalion losing its eagle and over 400 men. Then, the 24th Light regiment, which was coming up in support of the 4th, was also thrown back in disarray. It was at this moment that Napoleon sent in his Guard cavalry: 4 squadrons, 423 men, of the Mounted Chasseurs of the Imperial Guard and Mameluke regiment and 4 squadrons, 706 men, of the Grenadiers à Cheval regiment, with a battery of Guard horse artillery in support. The grenadiers charged vigorously and clashed with the Russian Chevalier Guard Regiment. After a short mêlée, the horse grenadiers broke the opponent, inflicting heavy casualties and capturing over 200 men, their commander - Prince Repnin - with his general staff, as well as 27 pieces of artillery, with the loss of just 2 killed and 22 wounded (among which 6 officers wounded).

=== War of the Fourth Coalition ===
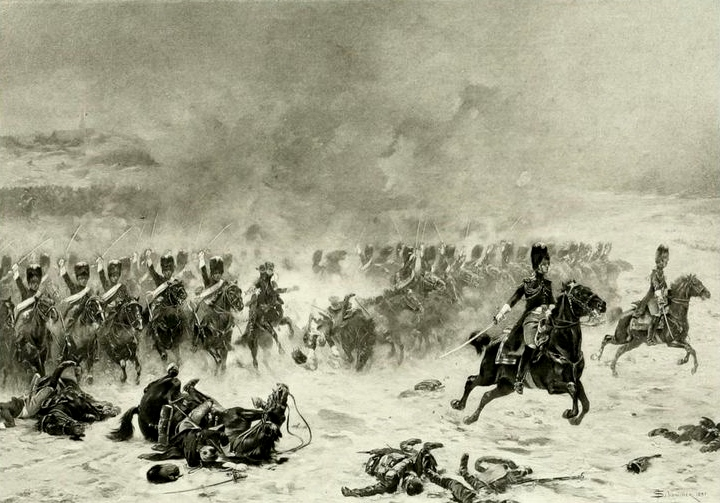
Colonel Lepic charging at the head of the Grenadiers à Cheval at Eylau.

In May 1806, General Walther replaced Ordener. Due to his seniority, Walther was also second-in-command of the entire Guard cavalry and exercised this command whenever Marshal Bessières was not available for service. The blitz 1806 campaign against Prussia went on without the regiment seeing any action. Nonetheless, war continued the next year in Poland, with the French in pursuit of the Russian army.

The rigors of the Polish winter, the bad roads and the extreme poverty of certain regions brought about considerable misery for both sides and rendered proper reconnaissance virtually impossible. After some initial maneuvering and minor engagements, the first major battle occurred at Eylau. Here, the Grande Armée gave battle, despite being seriously outnumbered and with the expected reinforcements failing to materialise, Napoleon's position was looking increasingly perilous. The Emperor thus ordered Marshal Murat to launch the entire reserve cavalry into a massive charge. At first, Murat led forward two dragoons and one cuirassiers divisions and these men pierced the Russian line and carried on beyond, only to find themselves behind enemy lines and in serious danger of being surrounded. As a result, the Emperor ordered Marshal Bessières to help the stranded reserve cavalry and thus a second cavalry charge ensued, spearheaded by the Chasseurs à Cheval and followed by the heavy cavalry of the 5th cuirassiers and Grenadiers à Cheval. Commanding the horse grenadiers was Colonel Lepic who superbly led two squadrons of the regiment, as they stormed through the first and second Russian lines, stopping only in front of the enemy reserves. As the handful of horse grenadiers arrived in front of this third enemy line, they were all but surrounded and the Russians at once demanded that they surrender. Lepic defiantly retorted: "Have a look at my men and tell me if they look like ones who want to surrender!" and he immediately ordered a charge, hacking his way back to his own lines. The regiment lost 4 officers dead and 14 officers wounded, as well as a large number of troopers, but the charge of the Guard cavalry did allow their fellow reserve cavalry to break their encirclement and get back to their original positions. The French would go on to draw the bloody Battle of Eylau later that evening.

=== The Peninsula ===
The Peninsular War erupted the following year, and the Grenadiers à Cheval, together with two newly created Young Guard infantry regiments and some Guard artillery, were a part of Bessières' 2nd Corps of the Army of Spain, and were present in Madrid during the May uprising, where their first surgeon, Gauthier, was wounded. They then campaigned in the north-west of the country. On July 14, at the Battle of Medina de Rioseco, Bessières, with around 14,000 men, faced two massed Spanish corps of about 22,000 men, not far from Valladolid. A few squadrons of the regiment saw brief but decisive action as they came up in support of general Merle's infantry attack, which repulsed the Spaniards onto Medina and beyond, winning the battle.

=== War of the Fifth Coalition ===
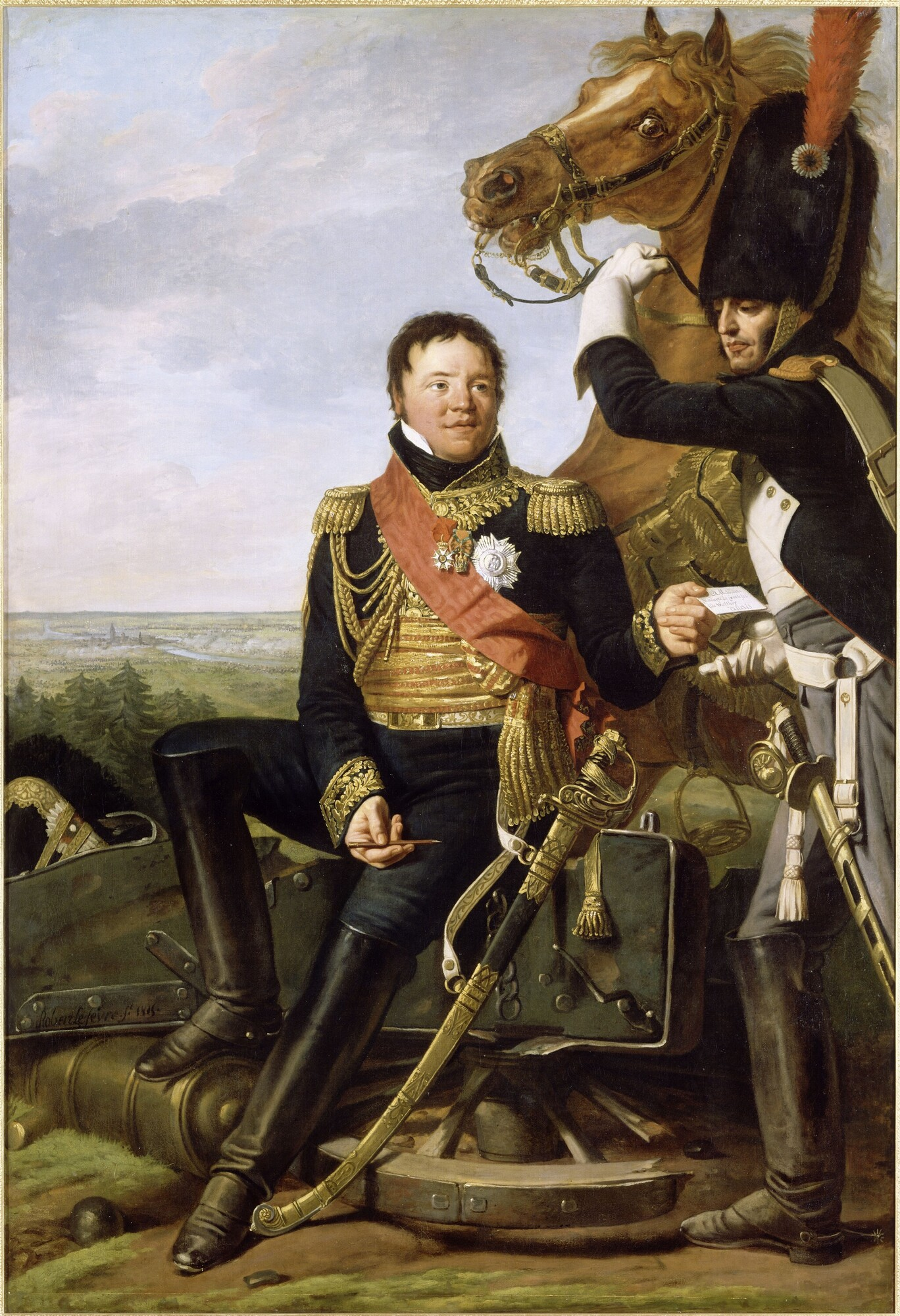
General Frédéric Henri Walther, here depicted with a Grenadier à Cheval holding his horse's bridle. A seasoned cavalryman, Walther became commander of the regiment in May 1806 but his behaviour at the battle of Wagram was subjected to criticism.

At the beginning of 1809, the Emperor recalled his Guard to central Germany for the War of the Fifth Coalition. They were present at the Battle of Aspern-Essling, under the intense fire of the numerous Austrian artillery, and saw the struggle of their army to contain a vastly superior opponent. When Napoleon himself had his boot torn by a canister ball, general Frédéric Henri Walther, commander of the Guard cavalry, threatened the Emperor that he would have his grenadiers take him behind the lines by force if he refused to do so willingly. The latter complied but had to order a general retreat of the army to the Danube island of Lobau. Six weeks later, Napoleon crossed the Danube again, this time managing to bring out a considerable force, attacking the Austrians on the Marchfeld plain. The ensuing Battle of Wagram would see the Grenadiers à Cheval in reserve during the first day of battle.

However, on the second day, July 6, 1809, the grenadiers, with the rest of the Guard cavalry, were assigned to support general Jacques MacDonald's massive attack column. After an initial success, MacDonald saw a rare opportunity to rout the disorderly troops before him and to that effect he requested a charge from general Étienne de Nansouty's cavalry reserve, inviting all other cavalry commanders in the sector to do the same. The Guard cavalry, however, did not move and the opportunity came to nothing. An angry MacDonald confronted Walther after the battle over the latter's inaction, at which Walther explained that neither his commander, Marshal Bessières, nor the Emperor, had given any orders for a charge and that the Guard could not act without direct orders from one of the two. MacDonald's attempts to explain that a charge would have been decisive fell on deaf ears, as Walther at once saluted and left.

=== Back to the Peninsula ===
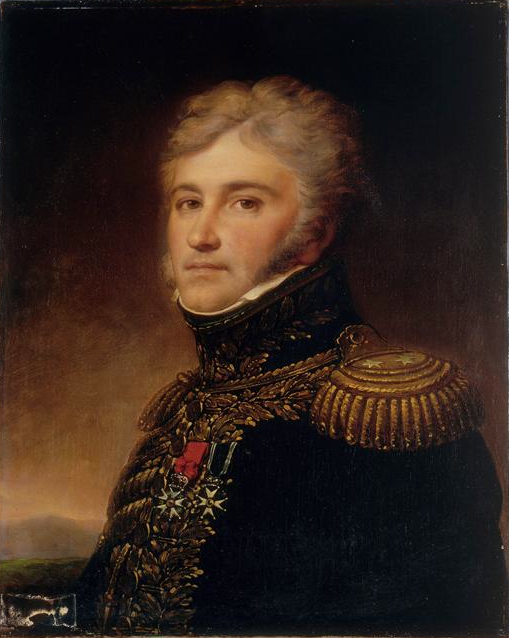
A portrait of the General Louis Lepic, by Louis-Charles Arsenne. In 1811, Lepic famously refused to charge at the Battle of Fuentes de Oñoro, citing a lack of orders from his direct commander.

During the two years that followed, only a few companies of the regiment would see active service, campaigning in Spain, where they accompanied Bessières in northwestern Spain, where the latter was supposed to support André Masséna's Army of Portugal. Masséna had been busy besieging general Wellington in Lisbon, but he was not able to pierce the fortified Lines of Torres Vedras and subsequently retreated to Almeida. Wellington followed him and on May 5, 1811, found himself in an awkward position at the Battle of Fuentes de Oñoro. Masséna needed Bessières' entire Army Corps, if he wanted to thoroughly beat the Anglo-Portuguese, but Bessières brought only symbolic reinforcements: a few squadrons of horse dragoons and grenadiers, 800 men in all, under the command of General Louis Lepic. Despite this setback, Masséna brilliantly exploited a weakness in Wellington's line and it soon seemed like the Anglo-Portuguese would be crushed. Time was at the essence and Masséna promptly sent his young aide-de-camp, Charles Oudinot, to find Lepic and the Guard cavalry, with orders to charge immediately, but Oudinot was soon back to his commander, saying that he was not able to fetch the Guard cavalry, because Lepic only recognized Bessières as commander and that he would not draw his sword without his order. Bessières was nowhere to be found, and after further futile attacks Masséna was forced to retreat.

=== Russian campaign ===
By 1812, the imminent eruption of the Russian campaign saw the Grenadiers-à-Cheval recalled from Spain. A part of the 3rd brigade of the Guard cavalry, they numbered 1166 men, spread between five squadrons (squadron commanders were: 1st sq. - Perrot, 2nd sq. - Mesmer, 3rd sq. - Rémy, 4th sq. - Hardy, 5th sq. - Morin). The first part of the campaign, from June to September, was nothing more than a long march for the Guard, which was never committed to battle and was able to arrive on the field of battle at Borodino at full strength. Despite the various insistent demands of the French field commanders during this epic battle, Napoleon refused to commit the Guard to battle so far away from France. During the great fire of Moscow, the Grenadiers-à-Cheval were used to police the city, due to their reputation of discipline and high moral standards. By mid-October, the entire Grande Armée began to move out of the ruined city and the retreat towards the Duchy of Warsaw would offer only secondary actions to the Grenadiers-à-Cheval, with the mission of ensuring the protection of the Imperial Headquarters. The skirmishes, the cold and the deprivations during the retreat took their toll on the regiment and by the time of the Battle of Berezina the combined Grenadiers-à-Cheval and Chasseurs-à-Cheval were able to field no more than 500 combat-worthy men on horseback, with several hundred dismounted. Despite this, there is evidence that morale remained good throughout. According to author Stephen de Chappedelaine, General Frédéric Henri Walther managed to bring his horse grenadiers out of Russia with few losses.

=== War of the Sixth Coalition ===
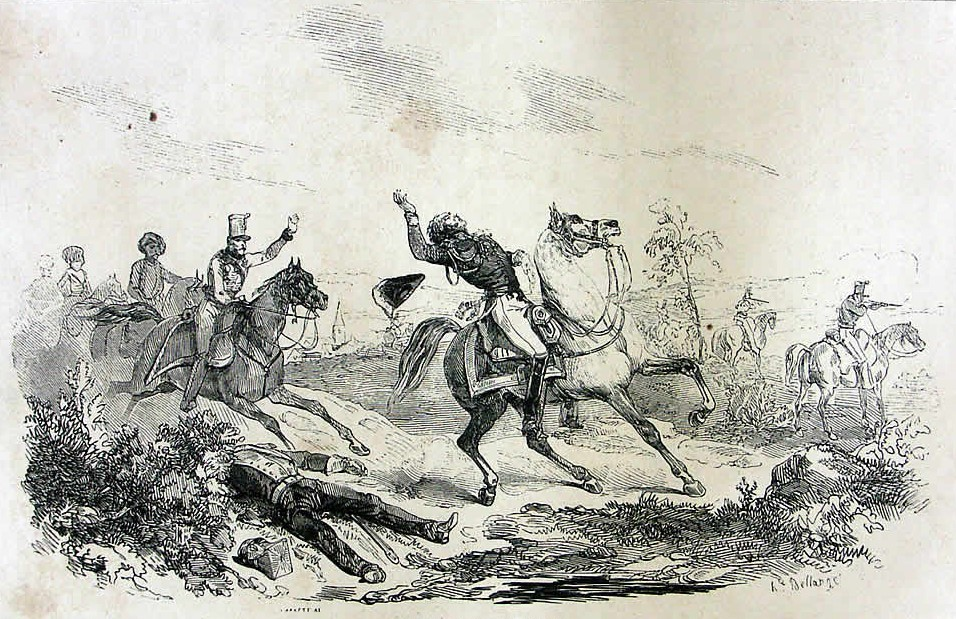
Death of Marshal Bessières on 1 May 1813. The Marshal had been the first commander of the regiment, up until 1800 and thus he was particularly loved by the Grenadiers-à-Cheval.

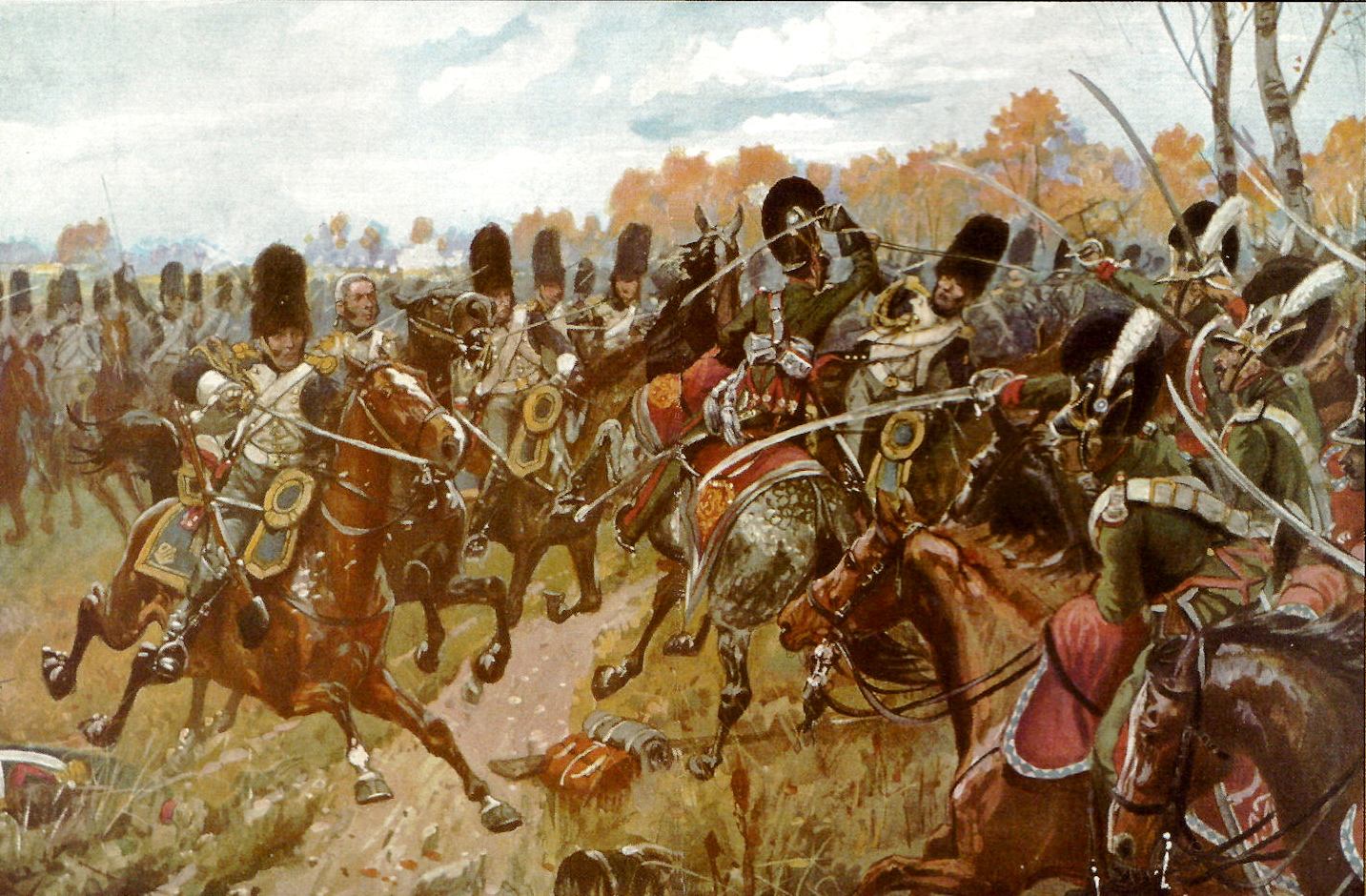
Charge of the Grenadiers-à-Cheval against Bavarian Chevau-légers in one of the decisive moments of the Battle of Hanau in 1813.

The regiment took some time to reform during 1813 and would only go back to action in April. Napoleon reviewed them at Erfurt on April 27; only three days later the Grenadiers-à-Cheval received news of the death of their beloved leader, Marshal Jean-Baptiste Bessières, who had been killed in action by a stray Russian cannonball, next to the village of Rippach. The regiment saw brief action at the Battle of Dresden and was involved in supporting the foot Guards take the village of Reudnitz, during the Battle of Leipzig in late October. The only major engagement of the year would come at the end of October, at the Battle of Hanau. As the Bavarians under Karl Philipp von Wrede were trying to block the retreat of the Grande Armée towards France, Napoleon was forced to commit his élite troops, personally haranguing the Grenadiers-à-Cheval as they were preparing to go into action. The entire Guard cavalry charged by squadron, in column and broke a numerous enemy cavalry, pursuing it for several hundred metres. During this battle, the colonel major of the regiment, general Louis-Marie Lévesque received six sabre cuts to the shoulder and arm and captain adjutant-major Guindey, famous for killing Prince Louis Ferdinand of Prussia at the Battle of Saalfeld seven years earlier, was killed in action. Another blow was dealt to the morale of the regiment on November 24 of that year, when the regiment's commander-in-chief, General of Division Frédéric Henri Walther died suddenly from exhaustion and illness. He was replaced on December 1 by the 45-year-old General of Division Claude Étienne Guyot, with the senior general of division Étienne Marie Antoine Champion de Nansouty taking overall command of the entire Guard cavalry.

The following year, war continued on French soil and began very badly, with the French army outnumbered and in very bad shape. The Guard cavalry, under Nansouty, was thus called into action more often than ever, combating valiantly and often playing an instrumental role in Napoleon's attempts to frustrate Coalition plans. Together with other regiments of the Guards, the Grenadiers fought against overwhelming enemy numbers at La Rothière and nine days later broke several Russian infantry squares from General Zakhar Olsufiev's force. At the Battle of Montmirail, the Grenadiers annihilated two Russian brigades and at the Battle of Château-Thierry successfully charged Coalition artillery batteries and two days later helped rout Gebhard Leberecht von Blücher's army at the Battle of Vauchamps. They were then involved in several actions, including major ones at Reims and Craonne, where they routed several enemy squares. During this battle, the commander (major) of the Grenadiers, General Lévesque de Laferrière was wounded by a bullet and had a leg torn off and also lost one of its best officers, Captain Kister. Their last action of the campaign was fought at Méry-sur-Seine, where they captured a team of pontooners belonging to the enemy "Army of Bohemia".

=== Bourbon Restoration and War of the Seventh Coalition ===
After Napoleon's abdication and the Bourbon Restoration, the Grenadiers were ordered to Blois, by royal ordinance. According to this ordinance, dated 12 May, they were to be reorganised into a "Corps of Royal Cuirassiers of France". Its complement was set by 21 June ordinance, which provided that the Corps was to be 42 officers and 602 men strong, divided into two-company strong squadrons. However, with Napoleon's return to power in late March 1815, the Grenadiers regained their former organisation and rank among the army. With the outbreak of the War of the Seventh Coalition, the Grenadiers were included in a Guard heavy cavalry division, alongside the Imperial Guard Dragoons. Their only engagement took place at the Battle of Waterloo. The charges of the Grenadiers were impetuous but losses were heavy: they lost major Jean-Baptiste-Auguste-Marie Jamin, killed by British canister shot near a Coalition square, two lieutenants (Tuefferd and Moreau) and sixteen other officers wounded. Waterloo was to be the last engagement of this legendary unit, which was disbanded by the Bourbons after their Second Restoration in late 1815.

== Sources ==
- Pigeard, Alain - „La Garde Impériale”, Tallandier, Bibliothèque Napoléonienne, ISBN 2-84734-177-3

== See also ==
Uniform of the 1st squadron of the Grenadier-à-cheval, in 1815, on "Les uniformes pendant la campagne des Cent Jours"
