= Louis Lepic =

French Army officer

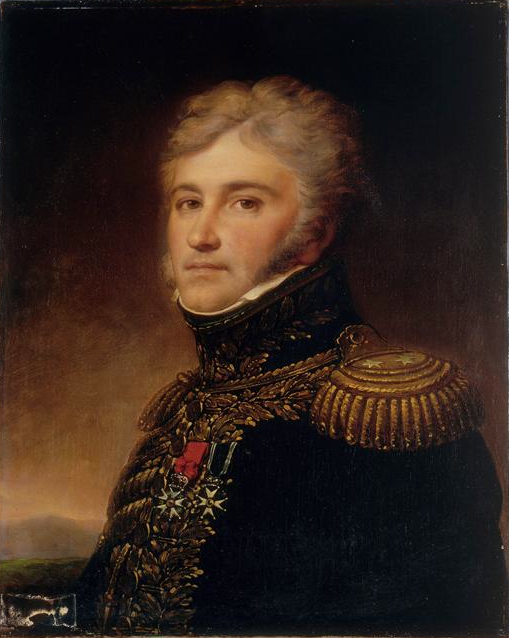
- Portrait by Louis-Charles Arsenne, 1842
- Born: 20 September 1765; Montpellier, France
- Died: 7 January 1827 (aged 61); Andrésy, France
- Military career
- Allegiance: Kingdom of France; French First Republic; First French Empire
- Branch: French Royal Army; French Revolutionary Army; French Imperial Army
- Service years: 1781–1815
- Rank: Divisional general
- Conflicts: French Revolutionary Wars; Napoleonic Wars
- Awards: Legion of Honour

Divisional-General Louis Lepic (September 20, 1765 – January 7, 1827) was a French Army officer who served in the French Revolutionary and Napoleonic Wars. He eventually rose to the rank of divisional general and held the prestigious command of the Mounted Grenadiers of the Imperial Guard, the senior heavy cavalry regiment of the Imperial Guard. He was made a Baron of the Empire in 1809 and then became a Count of the Empire in 1815, after which he was known as Comte Lepic.

== Early career and Revolutionary Wars ==
Born the eleventh child in a poor family from Montpellier, Lepic joined a dragoon regiment at age 16 and benefitted from the outburst of the French Revolution, which facilitated his promotion to squadron commander (March 1793). He was at first involved in fighting against the Vendéean insurrection, before moving to the 'Army of Italy' in 1796, where he was remarked for gallantry and was wounded several times. Lepic remained in Italy until the end of 1805, when he was named colonel major of the Grenadiers à Cheval de la Garde Impériale regiment of the newly created Imperial Guard, which he would command for the rest of his military career.

== Napoleonic Wars ==
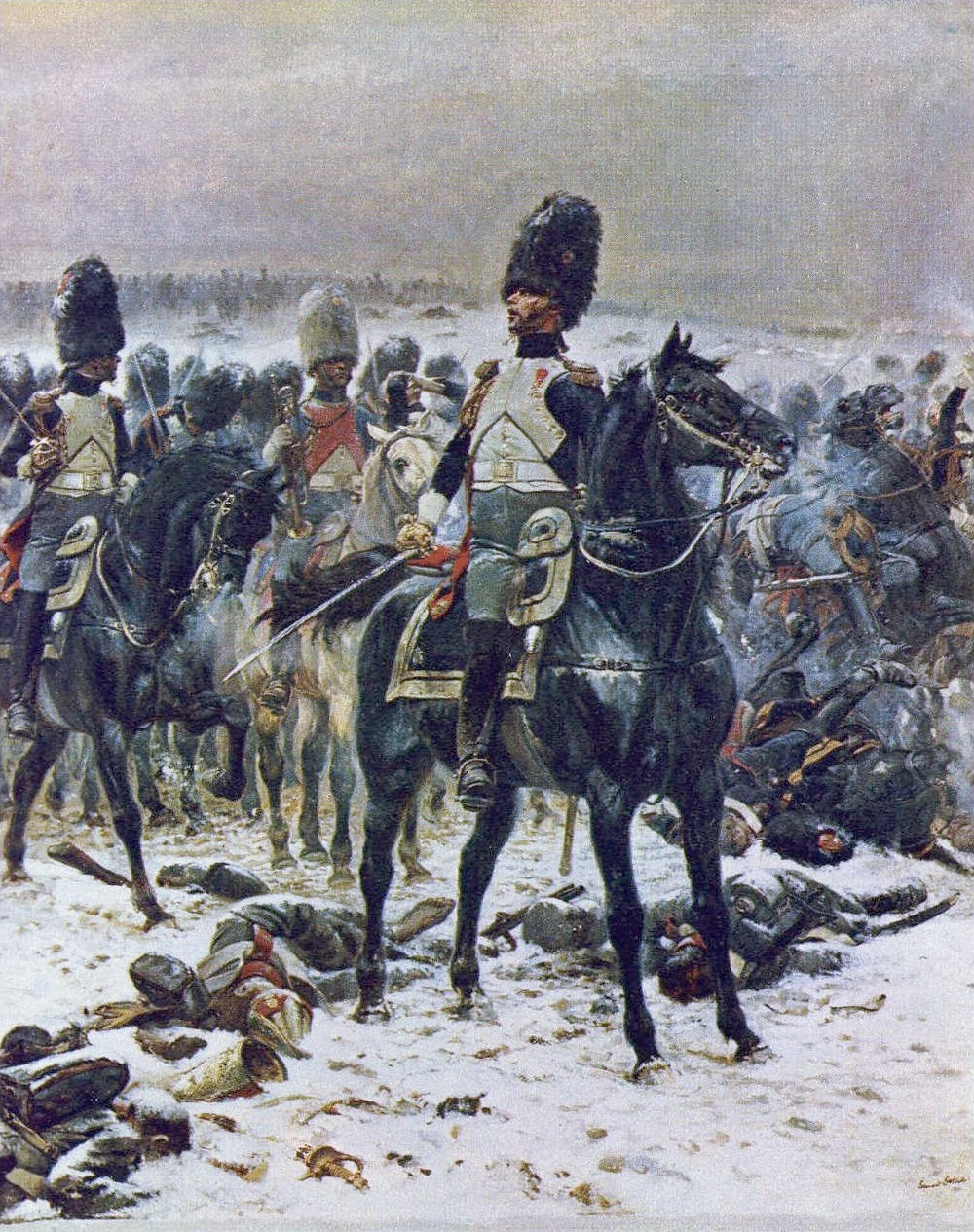
"Heads up, gentlemen, these are bullets not turds". Lepic harangues the Mounted Grenadiers as they form for a charge under intense fire at the Battle of Eylau.

Although he did not participate in the Battle of Austerlitz, he did take part to the campaigns in Prussia and Poland in 1806–07. At the Battle of Eylau, seeing his horse grenadiers lowering their heads as bullets whistled around, Lepic uttered the famous words: "Heads up, gentlemen, these are bullets not turds !" (Haut la tête, messieurs, la mitraille ce n'est pas de la merde !). The ensuing charge at the head of his regiment, in which he was seriously wounded, led him to be promoted to the rank of brigade general. Seeing Lepic after the battle, Napoleon went to him and said: "I thought you had been captured, general Lepic. I was feeling deeply sorrowful about it." Lepic retorted: "Sire, you will only ever hear of my death." That evening, Lepic, who had been seriously wounded in action that day, received 50,000 francs, which he immediately distributed among his unit. Five days later, he was promoted to brigade general and given an annuity of 30,000 francs.

Lepic served in Peninsular War in 1808 but was called back to France in 1809 to serve in the newly created Army of Germany, the main French army which fought the Austrians in the War of the Fifth Coalition. During this campaign, Lepic was named Baron of the Empire and was fought with his regiment at the Battle of Wagram. He would then serve in Spain and Portugal between 1810 and 1811, before being recalled to the second Grande Armée for the French invasion of Russia. During the invasion, his most important action was his regiment's charge against Matvei Platov's cossacks on November 7, which repulsed the Russian attack on Napoleon's headquarters.

Lepic was promoted to divisional general in February 1813, and he took part in the German campaign of 1813, where he would fight his last battles. Having retired in 1814, he was made a count by King Louis XVIII in January 1815. He subsequently rallied to Napoleon's return in the Hundred Days. He served in the Battle of Waterloo, before being retired by Louis XVIII.

== Legacy ==
The name LEPIC appears on the Arc de Triomphe in Paris.

His son was Louis-Joseph-Napoléon Lepic (1810–1875), who had a distinguished military career and was a close supporter of Napoleon III. His grandson was Ludovic-Napoléon Lepic, an artist and friend of Edgar Degas.

== Sources ==
- Fierro, Alfredo; Palluel-Guillard, André; Tulard, Jean - "Histoire et Dictionnaire du Consulat et de l'Empire”, Éditions Robert Laffont, ISBN 2-221-05858-5
