= Louis Pierre Aimé Chastel =

French officer in the Napoleonic Wars

Louis Pierre Aimé, baron Chastel (French pronunciation: [lwi pjɛʁ ɛme ʃastɛl]; 29 April 1774, in Veigy, near Carouge, Savoy – 26 September 1826, in Geneva) was a French officer in the Napoleonic Wars, who rose to lieutenant general of cavalry.

== Early career ==
Chastel first joined up in 1792, in the légion des Allobroges, under Jacques François Dugommier, was then transferred to the armée des Pyrénées and saw service in Italy. He took part in Bonaparte campaign in Egypt, where he discovered the Dendera Zodiac.

== Austerlitz ==
He was made major en second (Lieutenant Colonel) of the mounted grenadiers of the Imperial Guard, in 1803, following Austerlitz, where his bravery got him recognised by Napoleon.

== Peninsular War ==
He then fought in Spain during the Peninsular War, including Burgos, becoming an officer of the Légion d'honneur in November 1808.

== Russian Campaign ==
In 1812 he was summoned to join the French invasion of Russia where he led the 3rd Light Cavalry Division in the III Cavalry Corps. His bravery at Borodino gained him a mention in dispatches in the June 1815 bulletin during the Hundred Days.

== Hundred Days ==
During the return of Napoleon to power, Chastel served as commanding officer of 10th Cavalry Division together with Major General Jean Baptiste Alexandre Strolz' 9th Cavalry Division in General Exelman's II Corps of the armée du Nord.

=== Battle of Ligny ===
On 16 June, Exelman's II, Cavalry Corps held the right flank in Napoleon's last victory. Recognizing the position of 20,000 Prussians at Gembloux, Exelman's cavalry commanders Strolz and Chastel, heavily outnumbered were unable to interfere with the Prussian retreat on 17 June, having only 3,000 cavalry under their command.

=== Waterloo ===
During the battle of Waterloo, Chastel's 10th Cavalry Division fought at Wavre holding the extreme right flank on the east bank of the Dyle River while Strolz watched the far left flank on the west bank.

=== Rocquencourt and Le Chesnay ===
On 1 July 1815, Napoleon's Grande Armée fought its last battle in Rocquencourt and Le Chesnay, when Strolz' 2nd Cavalry Division, their rear covered by Chastel, together with three battalions of the 44th Line Infantry Regiment, and a half battalion of the Sèvres National Guard hunted down Oberstleutnant Eston von Sohr's Prussian cavalry brigade, wrecking the 3rd Brandenburg and 5th Pommeranian Hussar Regiments.

== Distinctions ==
- Chevalier de la Légion d' Honneur. (1803)
- Officier de la Légion d' Honneur. (1808)
- Chastel's name is engraved on the Arc de Triomphe.

== Sources ==
- Mullié, Charles (1852). "Chastel (Louis Pierre Aimé, baron)" . Biographie des célébrités militaires des armées de terre et de mer de 1789 à 1850 (in French). Paris: Poignavant et Compagnie.
