= Paul Leuilliot =

French historian (1897–1987)

Paul Leuilliot (1897–1987) was a French historian, specializing in nineteenth-century Alsace. He was the most prolific contributor to Annales in the 1930s and 1940s.

== Works ==
- Les Jacobins de Colmar: procès-verbaux des séances de la Société populaire (1791-1795), 1923
- La première restauration et les Cent Jours en Alsace, 1957
- L'Alsace au début du XIXe siecle; essais d'histoire politique, economique et religieuse, 1815-1830, 3 vols, 1959-1961
