= Friedrich von Sohr =

Eston von Sohr
- Military career
- Allegiance: Kingdom of Prussia
- Rank: Lieutenant general
- Unit: Hussars
- Conflicts: Battle of Rocquencourt

Friedrich Georg von Sohr (1775–1845) was a Prussian general who as a colonel of Prussian hussars commanded the 2nd cavalry brigade at Waterloo and during the Battle of Rocquencourt.

== Biography ==
His brigade consisted of the 3rd Brandenburg and 5th Pommeranian Hussar and the 11th (2nd Westphalian) Hussars Cavalry Regiment and were part of Major General von Wahlen-Jürgass' cavalry in Lieutenant General von Pirch's II Corps. Von Sohr was severely wounded while trapped in Le Chesnay, and surrendered to the French forces of General Jean Baptiste Alexandre Strolz.
