= Waterloo campaign peace negotiations =

Historical wartime negotiations between UK and France

After the defeat of the French Army of the North at the Battle of Waterloo (18 June 1815) and the subsequent abdication of Napoleon as Emperor of the French, the French Provisional Government repeatedly sent peace emissaries to British commander, the Duke of Wellington, who commanded the Anglo-allied army marching on Paris and others to Prince Blücher who commanded the Prussian army, which was also marching on Paris. The position of the Provisional Government was that now that Napoleon had abdicated (22 June) and two days later that his son was not recognised by the Provisional Government as his successor, that the casus belli was ended so the Seventh Coalition had no reason to continue its armed invasion of France.

The politics behind the Provisional Government's stance was that a substantial majority of those in the French Parliament and Government did not want a second restoration of Louis XVIII. The position of the two coalition commanders was that without Napoleon in person detained by Coalition forces, the surrender of the French border forts to Coalition forces, the military occupation of Paris by Coalition forces and the disarmament of the French Army, armed Bonapartism remained a distinct threat to peace of Europe. Wellington in particular was a strong advocate for the British Government's position that Louis XVIII was the rightful monarch of France and that any other regime was illegitimate, and could lead to further warfare between the Great Powers in Europe.

As agreed in Convention of St. Cloud, on 4 July, the French Army, commanded by Marshal Davoust, left Paris and proceeded on its march to the Loire. On 7 July, the two Coalition armies entered Paris. The Chamber of Peers, having received from the Provisional Government a notification of the course of events, terminated its sittings; the Chamber of Representatives protested, (Note: During the Hundred Days (les cent jours) return of Napoleon in 1815, under the terms of the Additional Act to the Constitutions of the Empire, the Chamber of Deputies (Chambre des députés) was briefly replaced by a Chamber of Representatives (Chambre des représentants). Many English language sources, ignore this change of name (as do English language primary sources) and call the Chamber of Representatives the Chamber of Deputies with an individual member being described as a deputy instead of a representative. Strictly speaking, députés translates as delegates, but the word is conventionally (mis)translated to its etymological cognate "deputies".) but in vain. Their President (Lanjuinais) resigned his Chair; and on the following day, the doors were closed, and the approaches guarded by Coalition troops.

On 8 July, the French king, Louis XVIII, made his public entry into Paris, amidst the acclamations of the people, and again occupied the throne.

== Formation of the French Provisional Government, 21–23 June 1815 ==
After the defeat of the Army of the North at the Battle of Waterloo, Napoleon judged that rather than stay with the remnants of the army, he needed to return to Paris as quickly as possible to secure his position as Emperor of the French. He arrived in Paris three days later on the afternoon of 21 June and immediately summoned his cabinet. Over the next 24 hours he lost control of the political process and was persuaded to abdicate the next afternoon in favour of his son Napoleon II. The Chamber of Representatives and the Chamber of Peers then elected a Commission of Government consisting of thee representatives: (Lazare, Count Carnot, Joseph Fouché, Duke of Otranto and General Paul Grenier); and two peers: Armand Caulaincourt, Duke of Vicenza and Nicolas Quinette, Baron Quinnette.

On the morning of 23 June the Commission met in session for the first time and appointed themselves and others to a new Provisional Government. One of the first acts of the new government was to appoint plenipotentiaries who set out that evening to negotiate for peace with the Seventh Coalition, on a condition which had then been fulfilled (that Napoleon Bonaparte was no longer recognised by the French Government to be Emperor of the French — however as Representative Bigonnet had pointed out in a heated debate in the Chamber, the coalition were in arms to secure the Treaty of Paris of 1814 under which Napoleon and his family were excluded from the throne.) The commissioners sent to negotiate with the allies were Marquis Lafayette, Sebastiani, D’Argenson, Count Laforêt, and Count Pontecoulant, attended by Benjamin Constant as secretary; they left Paris in the evening of 24 June.

== 23–26 June ==
=== French proposals for a suspension of hostilities ===
During 23 June, proposals were made by the French to the advanced posts of the Brunswick Corps commanded by Prince Frederick of the Netherlands near Valenciennes, as also to those of the Prussian I Corps commanded by General Zieten, for a suspension of hostilities, upon the grounds that Napoleon had abdicated in favour of his son; that a Provisional Government had been appointed, and that these persons had sent ministers to the Coalition Powers to treat for peace.

Both Wellington and Blücher considered that they would not be acting in accordance with the spirit and intentions of the Coalition of the Powers were they to listen to such proposals, and therefore peremptorily refused to discontinue their operations. Those which were addressed to the Prussian Commander emanated from General Count Morand, who commanded the rear guard of the French army at Laon; and to whom Blücher replied, that no armistice could be entered into, except in the case of Napoleon being delivered up, and the fortresses in rear of the two Coalition armies being abandoned and conceded as guarantees for its fulfillment.

At Saint-Quentin, on the 25 June, Prince Blücher received a letter from Laon addressed to the Allied Commanders by the Commissioners sent from the two Chambers of the French National Assembly; in which they communicated the fact of Napoleon's abdication, and of the elevation of his son to the throne, and stated that they had been deputed by the Provisional Government to negotiate an armistice.

To this Blücher replied verbally, by an aide de camp, that he would suspend hostilities on arriving at Paris, provided Bonaparte was given up to him, and several fortresses on the frontiers delivered up as sureties; and provided, also, that Wellington should agree to what might be proposed.

Marshal Soult, who had been indefatigable in collecting at Laon the remains of the defeated portion of the French Army, marched the latter, on 25 June, to Soissons; where it was to be joined by the force under the command of Marshal Grouchy. Grouchy, who, having preceded his troops which were yet a march and a half distant, had arrived in that town, to take the command of the whole army, according to instructions conveyed to him from the Provisional Government. Soult, as soon as he found himself thus superseded in the command, resigned from the Army, and left for Paris; disgusted with the abrupt and discourteous manner with which he had been treated.

=== Wellington's letter, 26 June ===
Upon returning in the night to his Headquarters at Vermand, Wellington found a note from Blücher, forwarding to him the letter from the French Commissioners, and to which Wellington replied immediately that he could not consent to the suspension of hostilities until the French army laid down its arms.

== 27–28 June ==
=== The policy of the French Provisional Government ===
In the midst of all the military preparations to defend Paris, the Provisional Government, the majority of which, under the influence of Fouché, was most desirous of effecting a cessation of hostilities, though acting ostensibly upon the grounds of a necessity of gaining time for the completion of the measures of defence, and of securing the capital from an assault, could not be otherwise than convinced, from the tenor of the replies made by the Coalition commanders to all its propositions, that the presence of Napoleon in Paris was the chief obstacle to any satisfactory arrangement.

=== Efforts made to induce Napoleon to leave Paris ===
The Provisional Government took two actions. The first was to persuade Napoleon to leave Paris for the Palace of Malmaison (15 kilometres (9.3 mi) east of the centre of Paris), which he did on 25 June. General Becker had been appointed to attend the latter at Malmaison, to watch over his safety, to insure him that respect to which he was so eminently entitled, and to prevent the ill-disposed from making use of his name for purposes of excitement and tumult.

As had been pointed out by Representative Bigonnet in the heated debate in the Chamber of Representatives on 22 June the coalition were in arms to secure the Treaty of Paris of 1814 under which Napoleon and his family were excluded from the throne, so the day after Napoleon withdrew from Paris, 26 June, the Provisional government issued a proclamation in the "name of the French People" and in doings so (rather than in the name of the Emperor Napoleon II) they in effect deposed Napoleon II and so met another of the Coalition war aims.

The Provisional Government was desirous of inducing the victorious Commanders of the Coalition armies to enter into negotiations. Another Commission was appointed, the members of which were Messrs Andréossy, Valence, Boissy d'Anglas, Flaugergues, and la Bernardière. They were directed to proceed to the Headquarters of the Coalition Field Marshals, again to solicit a suspension of hostilities and to negotiate an armistice.

Meanwhile, Wellington continued his operations with unabated activity. As the armies approached the capital, Fouché, president of the government, wrote a letter to the Wellington, requesting him to arrest the progress of the war and stating that the French nation wished to live neither under despotism as they had under Napoleon or under unbridled liberty as they had during the republic but "wishes to live under a monarch, but it wishes that that monarch live under the empire of laws".

A renewed application was received by Blücher, on 27 June, and by Wellington on the 28 June, from Andréossy, the primary commissioner, for a suspension of hostilities; as also a request that a passport and assurances of safety might be accorded to Napoleon and his family, to enable them to pass to the United States of America.

Prince Blücher declined taking any notice of the application, conceiving his former verbal reply quite sufficient. The Duke of Wellington referred the Commissioners to his reply of 26 June on the proposed suspension of hostilities; and stated that, with regard to the passport for Napoleon, he had no authority from his government, or from his coalition allies, to give any answer to such demand.

Symptoms of a rising among the Bonapartists in Paris had been manifested on the 28 June, a circumstance naturally consequent upon the re-union in the capital, of so many regiments of the line, as also of the Imperial Guard, whose excitement, devotion, and enthusiasm, had Napoleon placed himself once more at their head, might have been such as to have brought them into hostile and fierce collision with the other great parties of the state, and thus have led to scenes of the wildest anarchy and confusion within the walls, whilst the enemy was thundering at the gates from without. Hence every effort was employed to induce the ex-Emperor to quit the capital. The fact of the arrival of the Prussians in front of Saint-Denis, and the possibility of an attempt being made to carry him off from Malmaison, were explained to him with much earnestness.

Napoleon immediately referred to the map, and on perceiving the practicability of this coup de main, he adopted precautionary measures of defence. He also offered to the government his services in the capacity of general only, remarking, that he was prepared to march against the enemy, and frustrate his bold and hazardous attempt upon the capital. This proposal was sternly rejected. Fouché declared that to accede to it would be to remove every chance of arrangement with the Coalition powers, to create fresh troubles and disorders throughout the country, and, though a temporary success might be gained, to bring down eventually the concentrated force of the immense European armament upon the devoted capital. If on the other-hand Napoleon was devastatingly successful then he would be in a strong position to reclaim the Imperial crown; something that was also not in Fouché's interests.

== 29 June ==
=== Napoleon leaves Paris for America ===
The commissioners appointed by the government to communicate its wishes to Napoleon, no longer hesitated in arranging his departure, and it was arranged that although they could not acquire a passage of safe conduct from the Coalition commanders for the former emperor. Arrangements were made for him to depart for Rochefort were two French Frigates would be waiting to take him to the United States of America. Napoleon at length gave in to what he considered to be his destiny and he left for Rochefort at 17:00 on 29 June. So temporarily securing the Provisional Government in power and removing an impediment in their negotiations with the Coalition commanders.

=== The French Commissioners meet Wellington ===
Earlier in the day (29 June), the new commissioners appointed by the French government waited upon the Duke of Wellington at Etrées, for the purpose of negotiating a suspension of hostilities. In the course of the discussion which took place on this occasion, Wellington declared that he had nothing to add to the communication he had made to the former commissioners, that he could not but consider the abdication as a deception, and would not feel himself justified in suspending his operations on such a pretext, which was by no means calculated to fulfill the object the Allies had in view. He explained that, besides Napoleon, there were his adherents, who were the declared enemies of the Coalition, and stated that before he could agree to any suspension he "must see some steps taken to re-establish a government in France which should afford the Allies some chance of peace".

Upon this point the French pressed Wellington to give some explanation as to what would satisfy the Coalition. He replied that he had no authority from his own government, much less from the allies, to enter upon the subject, and that all he could do was to give them his private opinion, which he should certainly urge upon the allies with all the influence he might be supposed to possess, unless otherwise instructed by his own government.

=== The Policy of the Duke of Wellington — No hope of peace until Louis XVIII is restored ===
In the opinion of the historian William Siborne this exchange was a remarkable illustration of the sound judgement, straightforward policy, and unerring foresight, which are so pre-eminently characteristic of the military career of Wellington. Subsequent events proved its correctness to the letter. It was in strict accordance with the design traced out and enforced by the united diplomacy of Europe.

Wellington explained to the French Commissioners that there was no hope for peace until Louis XVIII was restored to his throne, but it would be advantageous for all concerned if this was done through the Assemblies recalling him without conditions, and before it became clear that this had been forced upon them by the Coalition.

The Commissioners suggested that Louis XVIII could only return if certain undertakings were given, among which was that the initiative in making the laws should be vested in the National Assembly and not in the King. Wellington replied that to his knowledge, Louis XVIII intended to form a ministry which should be individually and collectively responsible for all the acts of the government (similar the constitutional arrangements in United Kingdom at that time) and that he would be willing to meet the demand of the Assemblies that they should be responsible for creating new legislation.

Wellington later reported that the issue of Napoleon abdicating in favour of his son was explained away by the Commissioners, as necessity to placate returning Bonapartists in the defeated army, who were now arriving in Paris in great numbers.

While Wellington was in conference with the French Commissioners, Louis XVIII's Cambray Proclamation of 28 June arrived, which conceded many of the points which concerned the Commissioners. However they objected to some paragraphs, which excluded some named individuals from being in the King's presence, the intention to punish those who had colluded to restore the Emperor, and for the recall of the old Houses of Legislature. Wellington agreed to send a letter to Talleyrand (who had countersigned the Proclamation) outlining their concerns.

The Commissioners inquired if they could form a regency government under Napoleon II and if that would satisfy the Coalition or perhaps a government under some other member of the imperial family. Wellington made it clear that he would not slow his rate of advance on Paris and no other constitutional arrangement other than the restoration of Louis XVIII was acceptable to the Coalition. Wellington gave a detailed account of his discussion with the Commissioners in his dispatch on 2 July to Earl Bathurst British Secretary of State for War and the Colonies.

On the night of 29 June, Blücher ordered an attack on Aubervilliers. Before the attack commenced, Blücher was joined by Wellington, who communicated to him the proposals which had been made by the French Commissioners. Being already engaged in an important operation, he could not consent to suspend hostilities; and the two Commanders agreed that, as long as Napoleon remained in Paris, they could not arrest their operations without insisting upon his being delivered up to them. Accordingly, the Duke wrote a letter immediately to the Commissioners to this effect.

== More peace negotiations — Louis XVIII restored or the destruction of Paris ==
Since the departure of Napoleon, both the French army and the citizens looked upon the National Assembly as the sole directing power; and, in full reliance upon its integrity, appeared willingly submissive to its dictates. Fouché, who had been in secret communication with the Coalition, decided upon exercising, in accordance with their views, the great influence he had succeeded in acquiring over a very considerable portion of the Representatives. It was mainly by means of this influence that he contrived to remove the principal obstacle in the way of all negotiation — the presence of Napoleon, His next step was to prepare the Chamber for the return to power of the legitimate Monarch: a measure which he could only hope to accomplish by holding it forth as the sole alternative to the destruction of Paris by the vast and overwhelming force of the Coalition armies marching towards the capital from the north and east frontiers; and by combining with it the adoption of such modifications of the Charter as should satisfy the desires of the constitutionalists and the moderately disposed of all parties.

Aware that the French army was animated with a spirit of determined resistance towards the Coalition forces: Fouché plainly saw that, unless conciliated, the turbulent Bonapartists, with whom its ranks were filled, might speedily frustrate the accomplishment of his plans by which the peace of the capital was to be preserved, and ultimately prevent the attainment of that extended Constitutional Power for which the Representatives were contending. He, therefore, with his usual adroitness, addressed himself to its Chief, Marshal Davoust, Prince of Eckmühl; and by his skilful exposition of the political posture of affairs, he succeeded in gaining over the Marshal to his view. The latter wrote to him on the evening of 29 June, that he had overcome his prejudices; and had arrived at the conclusion that the only safe course to be pursued consisted in entering into an armistice, and proclaiming Louis XVIII.

On 30 June Marshal Davous wrote a letter to Wellington and Blücher from his headquarters at La Villette informing them that Marshal Suchet and the Austrian General Frimont had signed an armistice and he requested a general cessation of hostilities and an armistice as the Casus belli had ended with the abdication of Napoleon. However, if this request was refused then Davous made it clear that he would fight on in "defence and independence of my country". Wellington [Wellington's letter to Davoust, 1 July 1815 replied the next day] that his terms had been transmitted to Davous's Government in letter and verbally to the French Provisional Government.

Blücher, who entertained a great contempt for diplomacy, attributing as he did the cause of the renewal of the war to the ill concocted schemes to which that war had given birth, had hitherto refrained from either receiving in person, or noticing in writing, any communication addressed to him by the French authorities. He applied himself solely to the military solution of the Great Problem on which depended the Peace of Europe. Upon this occasion, however, tempted probably by the opportunity which was offered to him of sharply retorting upon the Marshal, under whose government of Hamburg the greatest excesses had been committed upon his countrymen; he was induced to reply in his native German, as if to evince both his disdain of the usual diplomatic mode of communication (French being the lingua franca of the day), and his dislike of even the very language of the country he so thoroughly detested. In it he states that Napoleon may have abdicated but he will continue the war while any member of Napoleon's family sits on the French throne, that if Paris is attacked there will be immense destruction "for you know what liberties the exasperated soldiers would take, should your capital be carried by storm", but if he is allowed into Paris he will "protect the respectable inhabitants against the mob, by whom they are threatened with pillage".

=== Address of French Generals to the Chamber of Representatives ===
Whilst thus endeavouring to draw the two Coalition generals into negotiation; Fouché and Davoust felt the necessity of carrying out their plans with the greatest caution, and in such a manner as to prevent any unfavourable construction being put upon their motives by the Army.

On the evening of 30 June, there was an assemblage of general officers at the headquarters in La Villette; at which it was proposed to send up an Address to the Chamber of Representatives expressive of the determined spirit of resistance which animated the troops, and of their hostility to the Bourbons. It was adopted by the majority; and Davoust, though secretly working with Fouché for the restoration of Louis XVIII, did not hesitate to attach to it his signature. It made it clear that the officers who represented the army were largely against the restoration of the but that they would obey the civilian government that commanded the support of the Chamber of Representatives.

=== The Proclamation of the Chambers of the National Assembly, 1 July ===
The Chambers being thus appealed to, felt it incumbent on them to issue a Proclamation explanatory of the political situation of France; and of their own intentions under all the critical circumstances in which it presented itself to their view. This document, cautiously drawn up by the Constitutionalists who formed the preponderating party in the State, and strongly marked by the policy which was pursued throughout by Fouché, was framed with great tact.

Although it acknowledged the nomination of Napoleon's son to the Empire, it manifested no hostility to the Bourbons: it expressed a desire to secure a Monarchical and Representative Government; but, at the same time, declared that the Head of the Government, whoever he might be, must enter into a solemn compact and abide by the constitutional charter.

In short, its general tone was sufficiently independent to secure for it, if not the approbation, at least the acquiescence, of both the Liberals and the Bonapartists; whilst, on the other hand, it significantly indicated the terms upon which a Bourbon might re-ascend the throne, and rally round him the friends of constitutional order and civil rights. With but few exceptions it admitted of being reconciled with the Cambray Proclamation published on 28 June by Louis XVIII.

=== Wellington proposes the terms of the Armistice, 2 July ===
The Provisional Government, fully alive to this state of things, and duly aware of the approach of the Bavarian, Russian, and Austrian armies (see Minor campaigns of 1815), clearly saw the futility of further resistance to the allies, and instructed the Commissioners to wait upon Wellington, and report to him the fact of Napoleon left Paris on 29 June to embark for the United States of America, and to press the point of a suspension of hostilities.

In a letter to Blücher Wellington explained the terms he was going to offer the French Commissioners and why he would do so. An attack on Paris before the Austrians arrived in force was unlikely to succeed or if it did "loss would be very severe". If they waited for the Austrians then the city could be taken easily, but the Coalition sovereigns who were travelling with the Austrian army would be likely wish to spare the city, as they had in 1814, because Louis VIII was their ally, In which case they would agree to terms similar to those Wellington was offering. Therefore, the two allied commanders were unlikely to have "the vain triumph of entering Paris at the head of our victorious troops", so better to end the war immediately than in a few days time.

In an audience with the French Commissioners, Wellington acknowledged that as Napoleon had left Paris, the greatest obstacle to the armistice had thus been removed, and there remained only the question as to the terms; which he thought should be the halting of the Anglo-Allied and Prussian armies in their present positions, the withdrawal of the French army from Paris across the Loire, and the placing of the capital in the keeping of the National Guards until the King should order otherwise. He offered, if they agreed to these terms, to endeavour to prevail on Blücher to halt his troops, and send an officer to settle the details; but, at the same time, he told them distinctly that he would not consent to suspend hostilities so long as a French soldier remained in Paris. Having received this explicit declaration on the part of Wellington, the Commissioners withdrew.

== Cessation of hostilities, 3 July ==
At a French Council of War, which was held during the night of 2/3 July in Paris, it was decided that the defence of the capital was not practicable against the two Coalition armies. Nevertheless, the French Commander-in-Chief Marshal Devout, was desirous that another attempt before he would finally agree to a suspension of hostilities.

The result was that the French were defeated at the Battle of Issy and forced to retreat back into the confines of Paris. When it became clear that the attack had failed, that the two Allied armies were in full communication with each other, and that a British Corps was likewise moving upon the left of the Seine towards Neuilly, the French high command decided that providing terms were not to odious that they would capitulate.

Accordingly, at 07:00, the French ceased fire and Brigadier General Revest (chief of staff to the French III Corps) was delegated to approach the Prussian 1 Corps (Zieten's), which was the nearest to the capital of all the Coalition forces, to offer a capitulation and to request an immediate armistice.

=== Formal surrender of Paris ===
On hearing of the unilateral French ceasefire, Blücher, required from Marshal Davout, that negotiations were opened, so that the Coalition to lay out their terms, before he would finally agree to a suspension of hostilities; and indicated the Palace of St. Cloud as the place where the negotiations should be carried on, and to which he then moved his headquarters.

The Duke of Wellington journeyed to St. Cloud to join Prince Blücher. Two Coalition offices, Colonel Hervey-Bathurst and Karl Müffling (the Prussian commissioner to Wellington's army), were furnished with full powers to negotiate terms with the French by their respective commanders-in-chief. They met the French delegation led by Louis Bignon, who held, the port-folio of foreign affairs, General Guillemot, chief of the general staff of the French army, and Comte de Bondy, prefect of the department of the Seine. The surrender of Paris was agreed and the terms of the surrender were laid out in the Convention of St. Cloud.

As agreed in Convention, on 4 July, the French Army, commanded by Marshal Davoust, left Paris and proceeded on its march to the Loire. On 7 July, the two Coalition armies entered Paris. The Chamber of Peers, having received from the Provisional Government a notification of the course of events, terminated its sittings; the Chamber of Representatives protested, but in vain. Their President (Lanjuinais) resigned his Chair; and on the following day, the doors were closed, and the approaches guarded by Coalition troops.

On 8 July, the French King, Louis XVIII, made his public entry into Paris, amidst the acclamations of the people, and again occupied the throne.
