= Caulaincourt =

Caulaincourt can refer to:

- Armand Augustin Louis de Caulaincourt (1773–1827), French general and diplomat
- Auguste-Jean-Gabriel de Caulaincourt (1777-1812), French general
- Caulaincourt, Aisne, a commune of the Aisne département, in France

== See also ==
- Rue de Caulaincourt, street adjacent to Lamarck–Caulaincourt station station of the Paris Metro
