= Napoleon's second abdication =

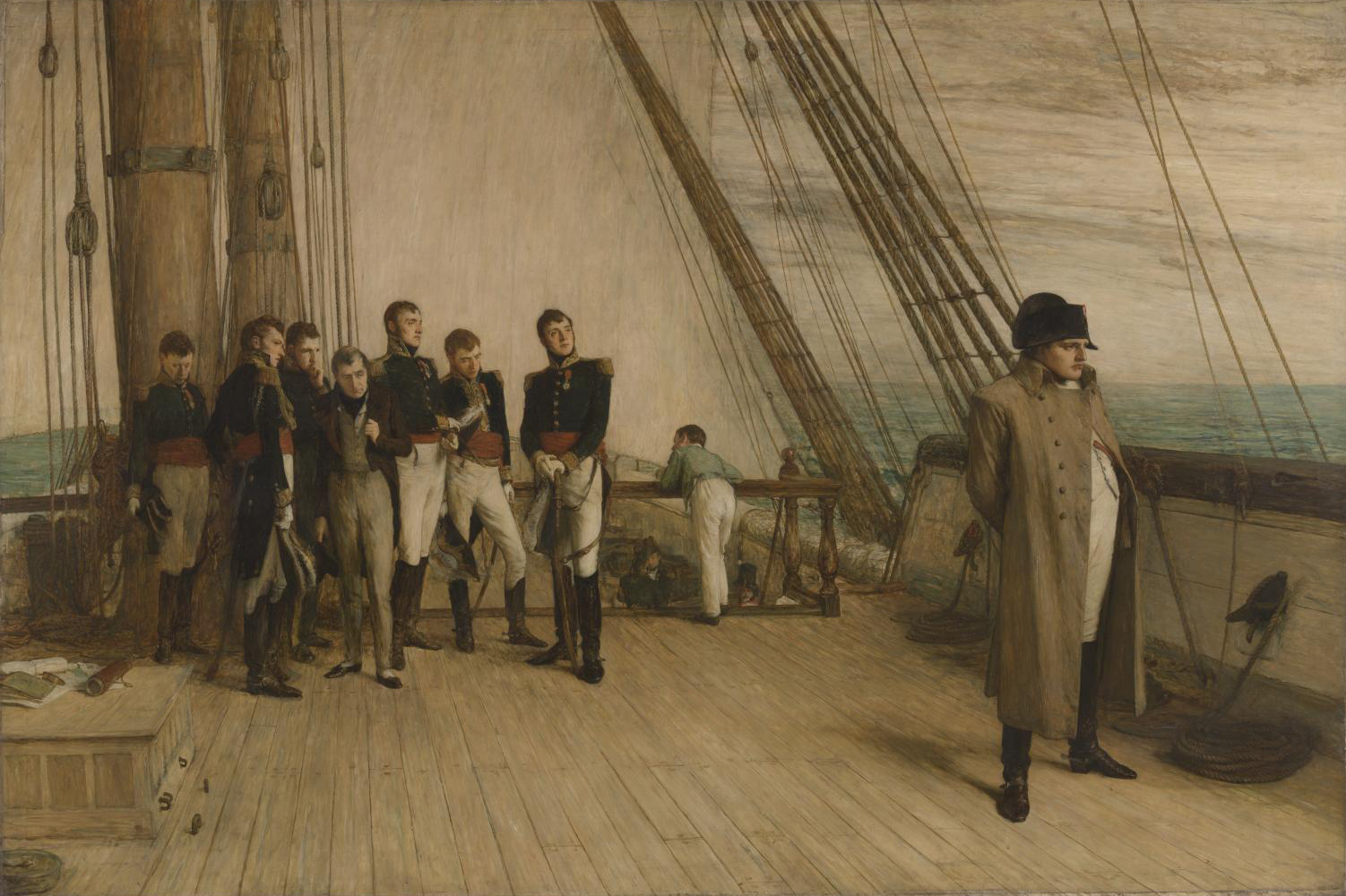
Napoleon on Board the Bellerophon, exhibited in 1880 by Sir William Quiller Orchardson. Orchardson depicts the morning of 23 July 1815, as Napoleon watches the French shoreline recede.

Napoleon Bonaparte, Emperor of the French, abdicated on 22 June 1815, in favour of his son Napoleon II. On 24 June, the Provisional Government then proclaimed his abdication to France and the rest of the world. It was the second time Napoleon had been forced to relinquish power, after his first abdication in April 1814.

Following his defeat at the Battle of Waterloo, Napoleon returned to Paris, seeking to maintain political backing for his position as Emperor of the French. Assuming his political base to be secured, he aspired to continue the war. However, the parliament (formed according to the Charter of 1815) created a Provisional Government and demanded Napoleon's abdication. Napoleon initially considered a coup d'état similar to the Coup of 18 Brumaire, but ultimately discarded this idea.

On 25 June, after a stay at the Palace of Malmaison, Napoleon left Paris towards the coast, hoping to reach the United States of America. Meanwhile, the Provisional Government deposed his son and attempted to negotiate a conditional surrender with the powers of the Seventh Coalition. As they failed obtaining concessions from the Coalition, which insisted on a military surrender and the restoration of Louis XVIII, Napoleon realised he could not evade the Royal Navy and surrendered to Captain Frederick Lewis Maitland, placing himself under his protection aboard HMS Bellerophon. The British Government refused Napoleon to set foot in England and arranged for his exile to the remote South Atlantic island of Saint Helena, where he lived until his death in 1821.

== Return to Paris, 21 June ==
Following the defeat at Waterloo, the French people's initial fascination with Napoleon, which had been prevalent since his return from exile, quickly faded as several Coalition armies advanced into France, reaching the gates of Paris.

Although his commanders urged him to remain and continue leading the troops in the field, Napoleon reasoned that if he did so, the home front might surrender to the Coalition forces, thereby undermining any progress he had achieved on the battlefield. Napoleon had previously acknowledged that his presence in Paris confounded his critics. However, his defeat and exile in 1814 had weakened his formerly absolute authority, making him more subservient to the elected legislature and public opinion. If he had keenly felt its influence prior to his defeat in battle, the task of calming public fervor and securing its support for renewed sacrifices was even more daunting when he suddenly arrived in Paris on June 21, just one week after assuming command of his army, to announce the disastrous outcome of his campaign.

The imperialists in the capital, who had harbored extravagant hopes following news of the victory at Ligny, barely had time to express their elation before ominous rumors of sudden reversals in Napoleon's cause began to circulate. The doubts and suspense were soon dispelled by the unexpected arrival of the Emperor himself. Napoleon reached Paris a mere two hours after news of his defeat at Waterloo reached the city, temporarily causing those plotting against him to halt their schemes. (Note: "The authentic news of the fatal battle had reached Paris about two hours before Napoleon came back; and immediately on its arrival a meeting assembled at the house of Mr. de Constant. Resolutions were taken to force the Emperor to abdicate, when, in the midst of their debate, someone entered the chamber, and announced that Napoleon was in Paris. In an instant Mr. de Constant was left alone: the deliberators had shot off on every side like bubbles on the water, or frogs dispersed by the sudden falling of a stone amongst them" (Hobhouse 1817, pp. 133).)

Historians have argued that Napoleon's calculated return to Paris could be seen as a political mistake, as some perceived it as desertion of his men and even an act of cowardice. Had he remained in the field, the nation might have rallied and fortune might have favoured him. Had the Chambers received news of his Waterloo defeat and moved to depose him, their decrees might not have been met with a nation still armed and ready.

Mary, an English woman residing in France, arrived in Paris shortly after Napoleon's defeat and observed that the French were growing accustomed to regime changes, having experienced two within 15 months. To many, these transitions seemed no more disruptive than a change in government in early 19th-century Britain. Not only had most civil servants retained their positions, but even some ministers had survived the regime shifts. Consequently, many individuals were hesitant to risk their lives or property for any particular regime. This stood in stark contrast to the perceptions of the general populace during the initial revolution and Napoleon's subsequent rise to power, which had brought about widespread upheaval and the Reign of Terror.

== Cabinet deliberations ==
Napoleon immediately summoned a Cabinet Council. He frankly explained to his ministers the critical state of affairs, but, at the same time, with his usual confidence in his own resources, declared his conviction that if the nation were called upon to rise en masse, the annihilation of the enemy would follow; but that if, instead of ordering new levies and adopting extraordinary measures, the Chambers were to allow themselves to be drawn into debates, and to waste their time in disputation, all would be lost. "Now that the enemy is in France", he added, "it is necessary that I should be invested with extraordinary power, that of a temporary dictatorship. As a measure of safety for the country, I might assume this power; but it would be better and more national that it should be conferred upon me by the Chambers".

The ministers were too well acquainted with the general views and disposition of the Chamber of Representatives to pronounce a direct approval of this step; but Napoleon, perceiving their hesitation, called upon them to express their opinion upon the measures of public safety required by existing circumstances. Lazare Carnot, the Minister of the Interior, conceived it to lie essential that the country should be declared in danger; that the Fédérés and National Guards should be called to arms; that Paris should be placed in a stage of siege and measures adopted for its defence; that at the last extremity the armed force should retire behind the Loire and take up an entrenched position; that the Army of La Vendée, where the Civil War had nearly terminated, as also the Corps of Observation in the south, should be recalled; and the enemy checked until sufficient force could be united and organised for the assumption of a vigorous offensive, by which he should be driven out of France. Denis Decrès, the Minister of the Navy, and Regnaud de Saint Jean d'Angely, the Secretary of State, supported this opinion; but Joseph Fouché, the Minister of Police, and the remaining ministers, remarked that the safety of the state did not depend upon any particular measure which might thus be proposed, but upon the Chambers of the Estates (Parliament); and upon their uniting with the head of the government: and that by manifesting towards them confidence and good faith, they would be induced to declare it to be their duty to unite with Napoleon in the adoption of energetic measures for securing the honour and independence of the nation.

=== Fouché's policy ===
Fouché's advice was a masterful display of dissimulation. As the Minister of Police, he possessed an unrivaled understanding of the public psyche, the shifting goals of various factions, and the temperaments of their leaders. He recognized that most parliamentary groups - excluding the minority Imperialists, whom he quietly courted with the promise of Napoleon II - were ready to depose the Emperor in exchange for constitutional liberty and liberal reform.

Fouché leveraged this intelligence to serve his own ambitions. Since the start of Napoleon's second reign, he had played the factions against one another, positioning himself as an indispensable tool for each. His influence was calibrated to either bolster or sabotage Napoleon's power, depending on the Emperor's fluctuating fortunes. Ultimately, the unwavering resolve of the Allies and the massive forces gathering against France convinced Fouché that, despite any potential military brilliance, Napoleon’s authority was destined to be crushed. He had been, and was still, in secret communication with the ministers and advisers of Louis XVIII; and was consequently in full possession of the general plans and intentions of the coalition powers.

When, therefore, Napoleon's enterprise had so signally failed, and the re-occupation of Paris appeared to be its necessary consequence, Fouché foresaw clearly that if the proposed dictatorship was assumed by means of a sudden and forced dissolution of the Chambers, implying that the recent reverses had been produced by treachery on the part of the Representatives, and if new levies were raised en masse in support of the force that yet remained available, the result would inevitably be anarchy and confusion in the capital, disorder and excesses throughout the whole country, and renewed disasters to the nation, together with an awful and useless sacrifice of life. To prevent such a catastrophe (as Fouché thought it would be), it was necessary to lull Napoleon's suspicions of the intentions of the Chambers; with which, at the same time, Fouché was fully acquainted. Hence it was that to gain sufficient time for the development of these intentions, Fouché gave to the Council the advice before mentioned.

Fouché strongly expressed his disapproval of the projected Dissolution of the Chambers, and assumption of the Dictatorship; declaring that any measures of that kind would only turn to distrust, and, not improbably, a general revolt. But, at the same time, his agents were making known throughout Paris the fullest extent of the disasters that had befallen Napoleon, and which had caused his sudden and unexpected return; and the Representatives were assembling in all haste, and in great numbers, to take a bold and decided step in the great national crisis. (Note: During the Hundred Days (les cent jours) return of Napoleon in 1815, under the terms of the Additional Act to the Constitutions of the Empire, the Chamber of Deputies (Chambre des députés) was briefly replaced by a Chamber of Representatives (Chambre des représentants). Many English-language sources ignore this change of name (as do English-language primary sources) and refer to the Chamber of Representatives as the Chamber of Deputies, with an individual member being described as a deputy instead of a representative. Strictly speaking, députés translates as delegates, but the word is commonly mis-translated to its etymological cognate "deputies".)

According to the historian William Siborne, in thus concealing from his master the real disposition of the great political parties and the true state of the public mind, Fouché betrayed the trust reposed in him; but, setting aside the question whether he was really influenced by patriotic motives or merely acting upon a system of deep duplicity and time serving expediency, by pursuing the line of conduct which he did on this important occasion he became the means of preserving his country from the infliction of a still further accumulation of evils.

The Cabinet Council continued in discussion; some supporting, and others disapproving, the propositions of Napoleon: who, at length, yielding to the arguments of Fouché and Carnot, declared he would submit himself to the loyalty of the Chambers, and confer with them as to the measures which the critical position of the country might render necessary.

== Resolutions of the Chamber of Representatives ==
In the meantime, the Representatives had met, early on 21 June 1815, and commenced their deliberations on the existing state of affairs. Gilbert du Motier, Marquis de Lafayette, the acknowledged Leader of the Liberal Party, having received intelligence of the subject of discussion in the Council, and aware that not a moment was to be lost in averting the blow with which their liberties were menaced, ascended the tribune and addressed the Chamber amidst a profound silence and breathless suspense:

Representatives! (Note: "Gentlemen" in some sources) For the first time during many years you hear a voice, which the old friends of liberty will yet recognize. I rise to address you concerning the dangers to which the country is exposed. (Note: Some sources replace this sentence with "The country is in danger, and you alone can save it".) The sinister reports which have been circulated during the last two days, are unhappily confirmed. This is the moment to rally round the national colours—the Tricoloured Standard of 1788—the standard of liberty, equality, and public order. It is you alone who can now protect the country from foreign attacks, and internal dissensions. It is you alone who can secure the independence and the honour of France.

Permit a veteran in the sacred cause of liberty, in all times a stranger to the spirit of faction, to submit to you some resolutions which appear to him to be demanded by a sense of the public danger, and by the love of our country. They are such as, I feel persuaded, you will see the necessity of adopting: (Note: Some sources replace these two sentences with: "Allow a veteran in the sacred cause of freedom, and a stranger to the spirit of faction, to submit to you some resolutions, which the dangers of the present crisis demand. I am assured that you will feel the necessity of adopting them")

- I. The Chamber of Deputies declares that the independence of the nation is menaced. (Note: some sources do not include "of Deputies")
- II. The Chamber declares its sittings permanent. Any attempt to dissolve it, shall be considered high treason. Whosoever shall render himself culpable of such an attempt shall be considered a traitor to his country, and immediately treated as such. (Note: in some sources: "Whosoever shall render himself culpable of such an attempt shall be considered a traitor to his country, and condemned as such".)
- III. The Army of the Line, and the National Guards, who have fought, and still fight, for the liberty, the independence, and the territory of France, have merited well of the country.
- IV. The Minister of the Interior is invited to assemble the principal officers of the Parisian national Guard, in order to consult on the means of providing it with arms, and of completing this corps of citizens, whose tried patriotism and zeal offer a sure guarantee for the liberty, prosperity, and tranquillity of the capital, and for the inviolability of the national representatives.
- V. The Ministers of War, of Foreign Affairs, of Police, and of the Interior are invited to repair immediately to the sittings of the Chamber.

No one ventured to oppose these bold resolutions—the Imperialist Party was taken by surprise. The leading members were now elsewhere with Napoleon, and the others did not have the courage to face the impending storm—and, after a brief discussion, in which their instant adoption was urged in the strongest manner, they were carried by acclamation, with the exception of the Fourth, which was suspended on account of the invidious distinction which it appeared to convey between the troops of the Line and the National Guards. They were then transmitted to the Chamber of Peers, where, after a short discussion, they were adopted without amendment.

== Further Cabinet discussions ==
The Message from the Chambers conveying these resolutions reached the Council in the midst of its deliberations. Napoleon was staggered by an act which he looked upon as an usurpation of the sovereign authority. To him, who had so long exercised an almost unlimited control in the state, who had led mighty armies to victory, and who had subjected powerful nations to his despotic sway, this sudden and energetic voice of the people, conveyed through the medium of their representatives, aroused him to a full sense of the change in the public mind and in his own individual position through the intervention of a constitution. He was alike indignant at what he conceived to be a daring presumption, and mortified at his own miscalculation in having convoked the Chambers. '"I had thought well", he remarked, "that I should have dismissed these people before my departure".

== Napoleon's message to the Representatives ==
After some reflection, Napoleon determined, if possible, to temporize with the Chambers. He sent Regnaud de Saint Jean d'Angely to the Chamber of Representatives, in his capacity as a member, to soothe the irritation that prevailed, to relate that the army had been upon the point of gaining a great victory when disaffected individuals created a panic; that the troops had since rallied; and that the Emperor had hastened to Paris to concert with the ministers and the Chambers such measures for the public safety as circumstances seemed to require. Carnot was directed to make a similar communication to the Chamber of Peers.

Regnaud vainly endeavoured to fulfill his mission. However, the Representatives had lost all patience, and insisted upon the ministers presenting themselves at the bar of the House. The latter at length obeyed the summons, Napoleon having consented, though with great reluctance, to their compliance with the mandate. He required them, however, to be accompanied by his brother Lucien Bonaparte, as an Extraordinary Commissioner, appointed to reply to the Interrogatories of the Chamber.

At 18:00 in the evening of 21 June, Lucien Bonaparte and the ministers made their appearance in the Chamber of Representatives. Lucien announced that he had been sent there by Napoleon as a Commissioner Extraordinary, to concert with the Assembly measures of safety. He then placed in the hands of the President the message from his brother. It contained a succinct recital of the disasters experienced at Waterloo: and recommended the Representatives to unite with the Head of the State in preserving the country from the fate of Poland, and from the re-imposition of the yoke which it had thrown off. It stated, also, that it was desirable that the two Chambers should appoint a Commission of five Members, to concert with the Ministers the measures to be adopted for the public safety, and the means of treating for peace with the Coalition Powers.

This message was not favourably received. A stormy discussion ensued, in the course of which it was soon made manifest that the Representatives required a more explicit declaration of Napoleon's opinions and designs: one, in fact, more in accordance with the views which the majority of them evidently entertained, and was apparently determined to enforce. One of their number significantly remarked, as he addressed himself to the Ministers,

You know as well as we do, that it is against Napoleon alone that Europe has declared War. From this moment, separate the cause of Napoleon from that of the Nation. In my opinion, there exists but one individual who stands in the way between us and peace. Let him pronounce the word and the country will be saved!

Several of the members spoke in a similar strain, and the debate was kept up with great animation, until at length it was agreed, that in conformity with the terms of the Imperial message, a Commission of five Members should be appointed.

=== Commission of ten members ===
On 21 June the Commission of five Members consisting of the President and Vice Presidents of the Chamber of Representatives, to collect, in concert with the Cabinet and with a Committee from the Chamber of Peers, the fullest information upon the state of France, and to propose suitable measures of safety, was created. The Committee consisted of Jean Denis, comte Lanjuinais (President of the Chamber of Peers), La Fayette, Jacques-Charles Dupont de l'Eure, Pierre-François Flaugergues, and Paul Grenier.

At 20:30 Lucien Bonaparte, now presented himself, in the same capacity of Commissioner Extraordinary, to the Chamber of Peers. After hearing the message, the latter also appointed a Committee, which consisted of Generals Antoine Drouot, Jean François Aimé Dejean, Antoine-François Andréossy and François Antoine de Boissy d'Anglas and Antoine Claire Thibaudeau.

At 23:00 that evening La Fayette addressed the 10 members of the joint commission and put forward two motions, the first calling for the abdication of Napoleon and the second for a special commission to negotiate terms with the allied coalition. Both motions were carried and they agreed to allow Napoleon one hour in which to respond to their ultimatum.

Napoleon, being fully informed of the proceedings of the Chamber of Representatives, and of the general tenor of the debates, hesitated a long time whether to dissolve the Assembly or to abdicate the Imperial crown. Some of his ministers, on perceiving the direction of his views, assured him that the Chamber had acquired too firm a hold of the public opinion to submit to any violent coup d'état and expressed their opinion, that by withholding the act of abdication, he might eventually deprive himself of the power of vacating the throne in favour of his son. Nevertheless, he appeared determined to defer this step to the very last moment; trusting in the meantime some favourable event might occur, tending to modify the present disposition of the Chamber.

== Morning of 22 of June ==
The Representatives met again at 09:30 the following morning (22 June). The utmost impatience was manifested for the report of the Committee. Two hours having elapsed, the members became greatly excited. Some of them proposed that the exigencies of the state were such, that it was their duty to adopt immediate and decisive measures, without waiting for the report.

At length, in the midst of the agitation and tumult which prevailed, General Grenier, the reporter of the Committee, suddenly made his appearance. He stated that, after a deliberation of five hours, the Committee had resolved:

That the safety of the country required that the Emperor should consent to the nomination, by the two Chambers, of a Commission, charged to negotiate directly with the coalesced powers; stipulating only that they should respect the national independence, the territorial integrity, and the right which belongs to every people of adopting such constitutions as it may think proper; and that these negotiations should be supported by the prompt development of the national force.

This statement excited general murmurs of disapprobation. But General Grenier, aware of the expectations of the Chamber, continued:

This Article, gentlemen, appears to me insufficient. It does not fulfil the object which the Chamber proposes to itself, because it is possible that your Deputation may not be admitted. I would not, therefore, urge the adoption of this measure, had I not reason to believe that you will soon receive a Message in which the Emperor will declare his wish; that the effect of this should first be tried; and that, should he then prove an insuperable obstacle to the nation being permitted to treat for its independence, he will be ready to make whatever sacrifice may be demanded of him.

This produced an extraordinary sensation in the Chamber. It was looked upon as an artful design upon the part of Napoleon to create delay by proposing to the Chambers a proceeding which he was well aware would prove unsuccessful; and to seize the first favourable opportunity of destroying their independence, and re-establishing his despotism — to re-enact, in short, the Eighteenth of Brumaire. The tumult had reached a fearful height. Many members exclaimed vehemently against the report.

At length, one of them, the Representative for Isère, Antoine Duchesne, ascended the tribune, and spoke in the following energetic and decided manner:

I do not believe that the project proposed by the Committee is capable of attaining the desired end. The greatness of our disasters cannot be denied: they are sufficiently proved by the presence of the Chief of our Armies in the capital. If there are no bounds to the energies of the nation, there are limits to its means. The Chambers cannot offer negotiations to the Allied Powers. The documents which have been communicated to us demonstrate that they have uniformly refused all the overtures which have been made to them; and they have declared that they will not treat with the French, as long as they shall have the Emperor at their head.

Duchesne was interrupted by the President, who announced that the message from the Emperor to which the reporter had referred would be received before 3:00 that afternoon. The interruption, however, at this most important point of the debate, renewed the tumult in the Chamber. Some exclaimed, "It is a concerted plan to make us lose time". Others cried out, "Some plot is concerting"; and the majority vociferated, "Proceed, proceed; there is no middle course".

Duchesne continued:

It is necessary that we should be certain of finding in the development of the national force, a defence sufficient to support our negotiations, and to enable us to treat with success concerning our honour and independence. Can that force be developed with sufficient rapidity? May not 'circumstances again lead victorious Armies to the capital? Then, and under their auspices, will reappear the ancient Family. ("Never! never!" exclaimed several voices".) I freely express my opinion. What may be the consequences of these events? We have only one certain means left, which is, to engage the Emperor, in the name of the safety of the State, in the sacred name of a suffering country, to declare his Abdication.

No sooner was this word pronounced than the entire Assembly rose; and amidst the clamour that ensued were heard a hundred voices exclaiming, "Seconded! seconded!".

When, at length, the President succeeded in restoring some degree of order, he said:

I cannot hope to arrive at any result, unless the agitation of the Assembly be repressed. The safely of the country depends on the decision of this day. I entreat the Chamber to wait for the Emperor's message.

The proposition of Duchesne was instantly supported by General Jean-Baptiste Solignac: an officer who, during the last five years, had been made to suffer the severest mortifications, arising from the hatred entertained towards him by Napoleon, in consequence of his refusal to be the servile instrument of his ambition; and, therefore, the curiosity of the Chamber was naturally excited to hear what course he was about to adopt. General Solignac said:

And I also share in the uneasiness of him who has preceded me at this tribune. Yes! we ought to consider the safety of the Empire, and the maintenance of our liberal institutions; and, while the Government is inclined to present to you such measures as tend to this end, it appears important to preserve to the Chamber the honour of not having proposed an object which ought to be the free concession of the Monarch. I move that a deputation of five members shall be appointed to proceed to the Emperor, which deputation shall express to His Majesty the urgency of his decision. Their report will, I trust, satisfy at once the wish of the assembly, and that of the nation.

This proposition was most favourably received, and the President was on the point of putting it to the vote, when Solagnac again appeared in the tribune:

I wish to propose an amendment to my motion. Several persons have intimated to me that we shall soon be informed of His Majesty's determination. I consequently think it necessary that we should wait for one hour, to receive the message; which it seems is to be addressed to the Chambers. I therefore move that we adjourn for that time (This part of his speech was met with great disapprobation on the part of the Chamber). Gentlemen! We all wish to save our country; but can we not reconcile this unanimous sentiment with the laudable desire that the Chamber should preserve the honour of the Chief of the State? (cries of "Yes! yes! ") If I requested that we should wait until this evening or tomorrow, some considerations might be opposed — but, one hour.

This speech was met with cries of "Yes! Yes! To the vote!" (the general exclamation). Marshal Louis-Nicolas Davout then came to the Chamber and read an extract from a dispatch from Marshal Jean-de-Dieu Soult, and concluded that the situation was grave but not hopeless adding

that a deceleration of treason against every national guard or soldier of the line who should desert his colours might yet save the country.

A member asked if this was true in the light of reports that Coalition forces had penetrated as far as Laon. Davout denied the fact and repeated that in his expert view that the military situation not hopeless. Shortly after the conclusion of his address, at 11:00 the Chamber adjourned.

=== Abdication, afternoon 22 June ===
In the meantime, Napoleon had been made acquainted with the disposition of the Chamber of Representatives, by Regnaud de Saint Jean d'Angely, who hastened to warn him that if he did not immediately abdicate, his deposition would, in all probability, be declared.

Napoleon was enraged at the idea of this contemplated violence, and stated

Since that is the case, I will not abdicate at all. The Chamber is composed of a set of Jacobins, impracticables, and intriguers; who are seeking for disorder, or for place. I ought to have denounced them to the Nation, and given them their dismissal. The time that has been lost may yet be recovered.

Regnaud, however, urged him in the strongest manner to yield to imperious circumstances, and to renew the noble and generous sacrifice he made in 1814. He assured him that if he did not take this step, he would be accused by the Chamber, and even by the whole nation, of having, out of personal considerations alone, prevented the possibility of obtaining peace.

Solignac and other Representatives were then announced. They boldly declared to him that he had no other course open to him but that of submission to the desire entertained by the Representatives of the Nation. Solignac described to him the scene in the Chamber of Representatives, and the difficulty he had experienced in inducing the latter to suspend, even for one hour, their decision; which, if not anticipated by a voluntary Abdication, would entail upon him the disgrace of forfeiture. Even his brothers, Lucien and Joseph, now gave their opinion that the moment for resistance had passed.

When the paroxysm of rage, to which these representations gave rise, had subsided, Napoleon announced his determination to abdicate in favour of his son; and, desiring his brother Lucien to take a pen, he dictated to him a declaration of abdication in favour of his son under the title Napoleon II, Emperor of the French.

The sitting of the house of Chambers had resumed at midday and at 13:00 Fouché, Armand Augustin Louis de Caulaincourt, Davout, and Carnot carried the declaration to the house and the President read it out. It was heard in respectful silence by all, and with considerable relief by those opposition members who had feared a last minute coup d'état.

The resignation was the last great act of Napoleon's political life. Defeated by foreign enemies in the field and subdued by their Representatives; he was forced to descend from the French throne. Almost all the previous changes and gradations in his career had been preluded or accompanied by some scene of dramatic effect, or a violent Coup d'état but, in this instance, the transition was attended by no circumstance more remarkable than the quietude with which it was effect.

That he meditated a second Eighteenth of Brumaire, there can be no doubt; but the decided tone of the debates in the National Assembly, the solicitations of his friends, and the hope of securing the throne to his family, induced him to abandon all idea of such a project. It is, besides, more than probable that, aware as he was of the bad feeling that existed, to a great extent, both in the Chambers and in the country, towards King Louis XVIII; as also of the conflicting principles of the different factions, he calculated upon the chances of an anarchy, where he might be called on to restore order.

== Selection of the commissioners of government ==
Once the formalities of the Napoleon's abdication had been observed, the house debated what should be done next. Some supported a regency government under Napoleon II, others a republic, and while most were against the restoration of Louis XVIII they realised that they were going to have to reach an accommodation with the Coalition powers, but did to want to spark a Coup d'état from the Army which still sympathetic to Napoleon. The Chamber rejected a proposition to declare themselves a national or constituent assembly on the grounds that such a measure would be an usurpation of authority and destroy the constitution under which they were acting. So the Chamber decided to elect a commission of government to authorise a new government under the constitution and decided not to communicate with the Coalition armies but to allow the new executive arm of the government to do so.

There were five hundred and eleven members present at the first round of voting for the commissioners of government:

- Lazare, Count Carnot received 304 votes
- Joseph Fouché, Duke of Otranto received 293 votes
- General Paul Grenier received 204 votes
- General Gilbert du Motier, Marquis de Lafayette received 142 votes (Note: With hindsight it seems that the chamber of representatives were mistaken, if they wished to oppose the restoration of the Bourbons. They should have supported Lafayette and his party. At 15:00 indeed, on 22 June, the chamber of representatives was eager for Lafayette; but by 17:00 their opinions had changed, and they resolved upon a regicide commission as the best security against the Bourbons. Hence Fouché was entrusted with the reins of power in this critical period, and Lafayette was sent to l‘laguenau, whence he did not return until after the capitulation of Paris: otherwise it is believed by some, that he would have called out the federates and the national guards to oppose the unconditional entry of Louis XVIII.)
- Marshal Jacques MacDonald received 137 votes
- Pierre Flaugergues received 46 votes
- Charles Lambrechts received 42 votes

Consequently, Carnot and Fouché were proclaimed two of the three members of the commission. During the second round of voting, a motion was made to make the sitting permanent. (Note: With the acceptance of this motion the Chamber broke with the former Emperor's position.) Grenier was chosen third member of the commission with 350 votes; and then the sitting was adjourned until 11:00 the next morning.

The house of peers met about 13:30 and Carnot read out the abdication proclamation. This was listened to quietly, but when the Count then reported on the state of the army a heated debate took place with Marshal Michel Ney stating that:

Marshal Grouchy and the Duke of Dalmatia can not collect sixty thousand men. That number can not be brought together on the northern frontier. Marchal Grouchy, for his part, has been able to rally only seven of eight thousand men. The Duke of Dalmatia has not been able to make any stand at Rocroy. You have no other means of saving your country but by negotiation.

The peers were informed what the Chamber of Representatives had decided. Prince Lucien and other Bonapartists who pointed out that Napoleon had abdicated in favour of his son and if his son was not recognised then the abdication could be considered void. The chamber decided not to support the Bonapartists and agreed to send two of their members to sit as commissioners of government. In the first round of voting Armand Caulaincourt, Duke of Vicenza was elected with 51 votes, and in the second round Nicolas Quinette, Baron Quinnette gained 48 votes and was named the fifth member of the commission. The peers finally adjourned at 2:30am on 23 June.

== Formation of a Provisional Government, 23 June ==
On the morning of 23 June the commissioners appointed Joseph Fouché, Duke of Otranto as its president. Marshal André Masséna, Prince of Essling was named commander in chief of the Parisian National Guard, Count Antoine-François Andréossy commander of the first military division, and Count Antoine Drouot of the Imperial Guard. Louis Pierre Édouard, Baron Bignon was chosen minister, provisionally, for foreign affairs, General Carnot of the interior, and Count Joseph Pelet de la Lozère of the police.

That evening plenipotentiaries were set out to treat in the name of the nation, and to negotiate with the European powers for that peace which they have promised them, on a condition which has now been fulfilled (that Napoleon Bonaparte was no longer recognised by the French Government to be Emperor of the French — however as Representative Jean Adrien Bigonnet had pointed out in a heated debate in the Chamber, the coalition were in arms to secure the Treaty of Paris of 1814 under which Napoleon and his family were excluded from the throne.) The commissioners sent to treat with the allies were Messrs. Lafayette, Sebastiani, D’Argenson, Count Laforêt, and Count Pontecoulant, attended by Benjamin Constant as secretary; they left Paris in the evening of 24 June.

== Paris Proclamation of the Provisional Government, 24 June ==
On 24 June, the Provisional Government in Paris, which had been appointed on the previous day after a stormy discussion in both Chambers on the subject of the recognition of Napoleon II, and which consisted five men, two of whom were appointed by the Chamber of Peers and three by the Chamber of Representatives: Joseph Fouché, Duke of Otranto, the Minister of the Police; Armand Caulaincourt, Duke of Vicenza, the Minister of Foreign Affairs; Lazare Carnot, Minister of the Interior; General Paul Grenier; and Nicolas Quinette; issued the a proclamation that Napoleon was abdicating for the "peace [of France] and that of the World" in favour of his son Napoleon II.

== Napoleon leaves Paris for the Palace of Malmaison, 25 June ==
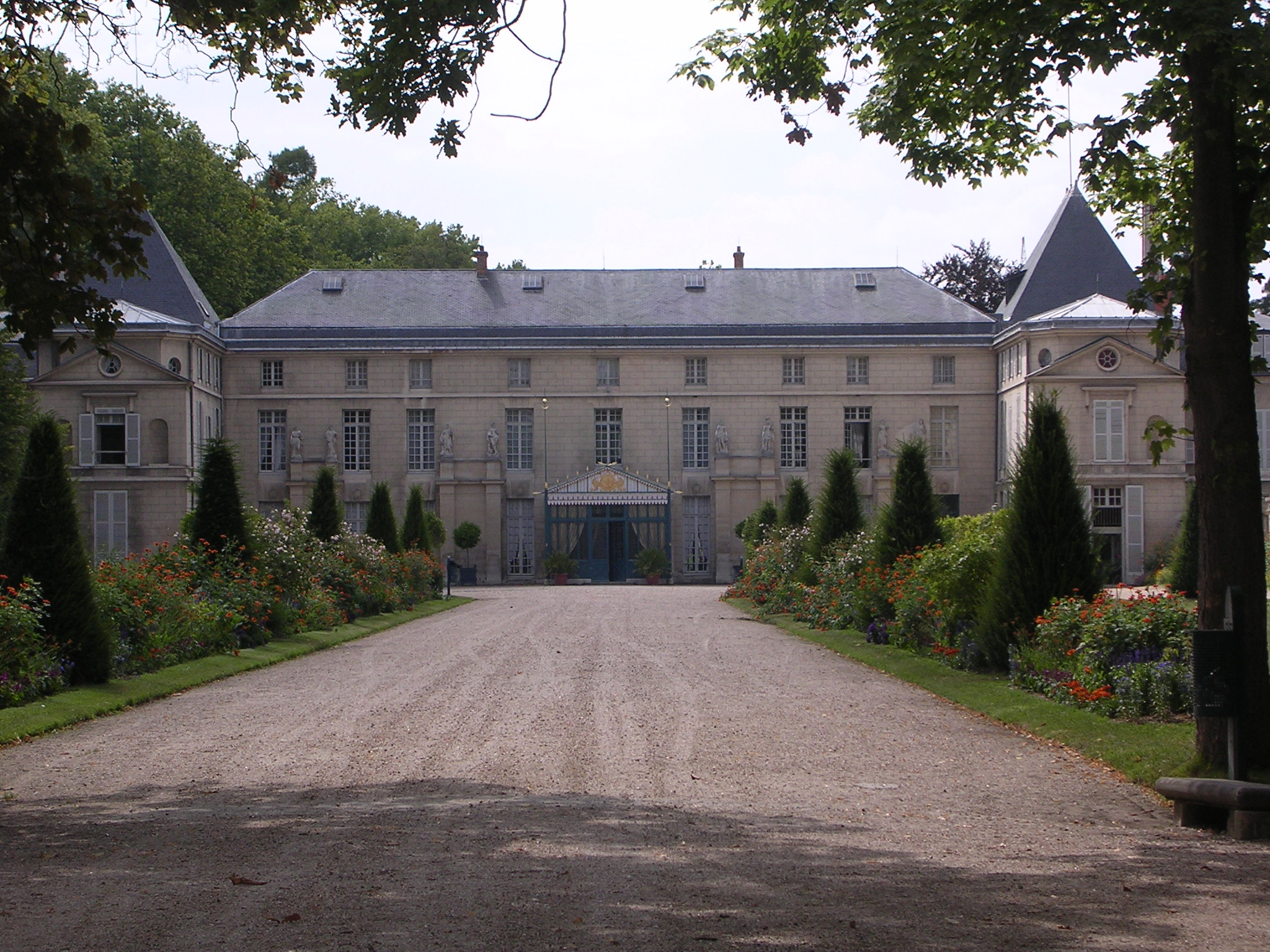
The Château de Malmaison

On 25 June, Napoleon withdrew from the capital to the country Palace of Malmaison (15 kilometres (9.3 mi) east of the centre of Paris). From there he issued an address to the army in which he encouraged the soldiers to fight on.

== Napoleon II deposed, 26 June ==
On 26 June the government transmitted to the chambers a bulletin tending to confirm the favourable accounts from the army, and to assure them, that their affairs were a more favourable aspect than at first could have been hoped; that they would neither exaggerate nor dissimulate the dangers, and in all emergencies would stand true to their country. On the same day the government issued a public proclamation that explained how the law was to operate "In the name of the French people" instead of in the name of Napoleon II, and thus, after a reign of three days, Napoleon II has been replaced by the French people.

== Napoleon leaves Malmaison for America, 29 June ==
To facilitate his departure from the country, the Provisional Government requested that a passport and assurances of safety might be accorded to Napoleon and his family, to enable them to pass to the United States of America. Blücher ignored the request, and Wellington referred the Commissioners to his note of 26 June on the proposed Suspension of Hostilities; and stated that, with regard to the passport for Napoleon, he had no authority from his Government, or from the Allies, to give any answer to such demand.

The commissioners appointed by the government to communicate its wishes to Napoleon, no longer hesitated in arranging his departure. The minister of the marine, and Count Boulay, repaired to his residence, and explained to him that Wellington and Blücher had refused to give him any safeguard or passport, and that he had now only to take his immediate departure.

Napoleon narrowly escaped falling into the hands of the Prussians, whilst at Malmaison. Blücher, hearing that he was living there in retirement, had despatched Major Friedrich August Peter von Colomb, on 28 June, with the 8th Hussars and two battalions of infantry to secure the bridge at Chatou, lower down the Seine, leading directly to the house. Fortunately, for Napoleon, Marshal Davout, when he ascertained that the Prussians were nearing the capital, had ordered General Nicolas Léonard Beker to destroy the bridge. Hence, Major von Colomb was very disappointed to find there was no passage at this point, which in fact was not more than 730 metres (800 yd) distant from the palace, in which Napoleon was yet remaining at the time of the arrival of the Prussians.

Napoleon at length yielded to what he considered to be his destiny, and the preparations for travelling having been completed, he entered his carriage at about 17:00 on 29 June, accompanied by Generals Bertrand, Gaspard Gourgaud, and other devoted friends, and took the road to Rochefort, whither two French frigates had been ordered for the embarkation of himself and his entourage for America.

== Capture by the British, 10 July ==
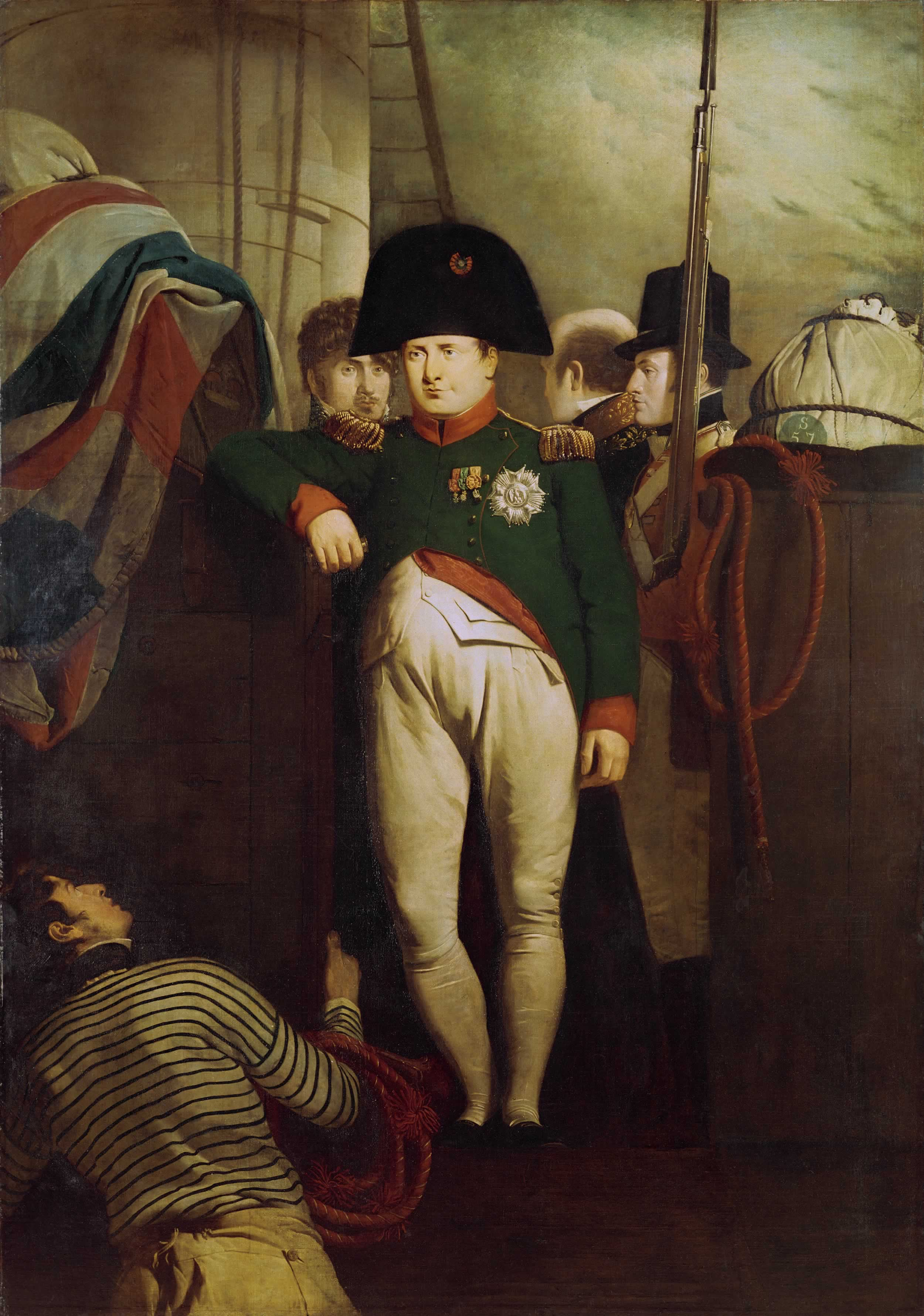
Napoleon on the Bellerophon at Plymouth, by Sir Charles Lock Eastlake, 1815. Eastlake was rowed out to the Bellerophon to make sketches, from which he later painted this portrait.

As agreed in the Convention of St. Cloud, on 3 July, the French Army, commanded by Marshal Davout, quit Paris and proceeded on its march to the Loire. On 7 July, the two Coalition armies entered Paris. The Chamber of Peers, having received from the Provisional Government a notification of the course of events, terminated its sittings; the Chamber of Representatives protested, but in vain. Their President (Lanjuinais) resigned his Chair; and on the following day, the doors were closed, and the approaches guarded by foreign troops.

On 8 July, the French King, Louis XVIII, made his public entry into his capital, amidst the acclamations of the people, and again occupied the throne. Also that day, Napoleon Bonaparte embarked, at Rochefort, on board the French frigate Saale, and proceeded, accompanied by Méduse, in which was his small entourage, to an anchorage in the Basque Roads off the Isle of Aix, with the intention of setting sail to America.

On 10 July, the wind became favourable, but a British fleet made its appearance; and Napoleon, seeing the difficulty of eluding the vigilance of its cruisers, resolved, after having previously communicated with Captain Frederick Lewis Maitland, upon placing himself under his protection on board HMS Bellerophon, which vessel he accordingly reached on 15 July. On the following day, Captain Maitland sailed for England; and arrived at Torbay, with his illustrious charge, on 24 July. Despite his protestations, Napoleon was not permitted to land in England (the British government having decided upon sending him to the island of Saint Helena). On 26 July, Bellerophon received orders to sail for Plymouth, and there he remained for several days. On 4 August, he was moved to HMS Northumberland, a third-rate ship of the line, under Rear Admiral Sir George Cockburn, in which ship he sailed to his incarceration on the remote South Atlantic island. Napoleon remained a captive on Saint Helena until his death in 1821.
