= Andréossy =

Andréossy is a surname. Notable people with the surname include:

- Antoine-François Andréossy (1761–1828), Franco-Italian nobleman, artillery general, diplomat and parliamentarian
- François Andréossy (1633–1688), French engineer
