= Abdication of Napoleon =

Abdication of Napoleon may refer to:

- Abdication of Napoleon (1814), following the Treaty of Fontainebleau (1814)
- Abdication of Napoleon (1815)
