= Flaugergues =

Flaugergues may refer to:

- Honoré Flaugergues (1755–1830/5), French astronomer
- Pierre-François Flaugergues (1767–1836), French lawyer
- Flaugergues (crater), a crater on Mars
- Château de Flaugergues, a castle near Montpellier, Languedoc-Roussillon, France
