= Arelaune-en-Seine =

- Commune
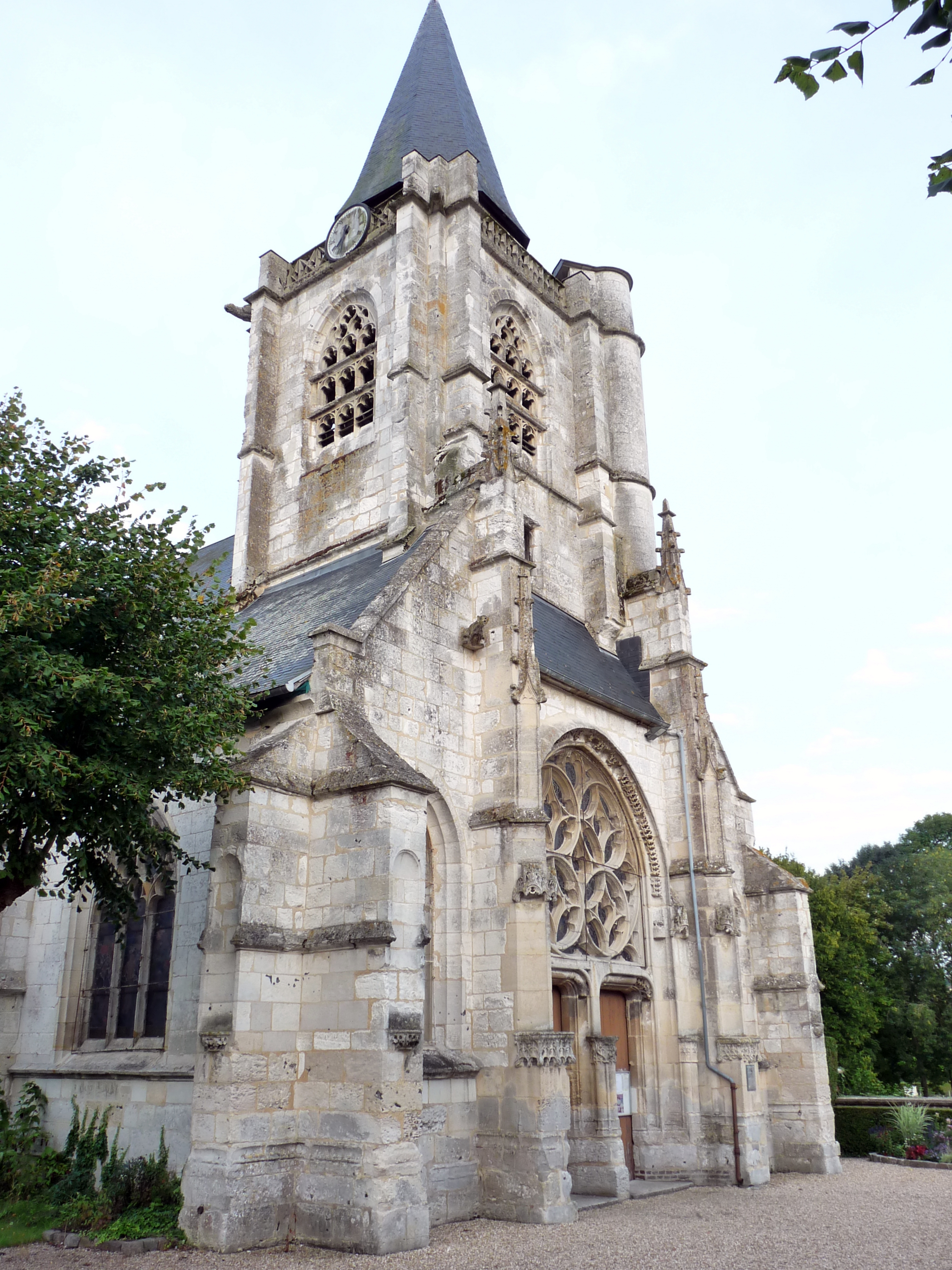
- The church in La Mailleraye-sur-Seine
- Location of Arelaune-en-Seine
- Location within France Location within Normandy
- Coordinates: 49°28′55″N 0°46′16″E
- Country: France
- Region: Normandy
- Department: Seine-Maritime
- Arrondissement: Rouen
- Canton: Port-Jérôme-sur-Seine
- Intercommunality: Caux Seine Agglo

Government
  - Mayor (2020–2026): Maryline Miranda Teodoro
- Area^{1}: 53.81 km^{2} (20.78 sq mi)
- Population (2023): 2,546
  - Density: 47.31/km^{2} (122.5/sq mi)
- Time zone: UTC+01:00 (CET)
  - Summer (DST): UTC+02:00 (CEST)
- INSEE/Postal code: 76401 /76940
- ^{1} French Land Register data, which excludes lakes, ponds, glaciers > 1 km^{2} (0.386 sq mi or 247 acres) and river estuaries.

Arelaune-en-Seine (French pronunciation: [aʁlon ɑ̃ sɛn]) is a commune in the department of Seine-Maritime, northern France. The municipality was established on 1 January 2016 by merger of the former communes of La Mailleraye-sur-Seine and Saint-Nicolas-de-Bliquetuit.

== Population ==
Population data refer to the area corresponding with the commune as of January 2025.

Historical population
| Year | Pop. | ±% p.a. |
|---|---|---|
| 1968 | 1,877 | — |
| 1975 | 2,041 | +1.20% |
| 1982 | 2,170 | +0.88% |
| 1990 | 2,343 | +0.96% |
| 1999 | 2,325 | −0.09% |
| 2007 | 2,486 | +0.84% |
| 2012 | 2,599 | +0.89% |
| 2017 | 2,576 | −0.18% |
| 2023 | 2,546 | −0.20% |
Source: INSEE

== See also ==
- Communes of the Seine-Maritime department
