= Saint-Nicolas-de-Bliquetuit =

- Part of Arelaune-en-Seine
- Location of Saint-Nicolas-de-Bliquetuit
- Location within France Location within Normandy
- Coordinates: 49°30′32″N 0°43′48″E
- Country: France
- Region: Normandy
- Department: Seine-Maritime
- Arrondissement: Rouen
- Canton: Notre-Dame-de-Gravenchon
- Commune: Arelaune-en-Seine
- Area^{1}: 9.23 km^{2} (3.56 sq mi)
- Elevation: 10 m (33 ft)
- Highest elevation: 54 m (177 ft)
- Lowest elevation: 1 m (3.3 ft)
- Population (2023): 609
  - Density: 66.0/km^{2} (171/sq mi)
- Time zone: UTC+01:00 (CET)
  - Summer (DST): UTC+02:00 (CEST)
- Postal code: 76940
- ^{1} French Land Register data, which excludes lakes, ponds, glaciers > 1 km^{2} (0.386 sq mi or 247 acres) and river estuaries.

Saint-Nicolas-de-Bliquetuit (French pronunciation: [sɛ̃ nikɔla də bliktɥi]) is a former commune in the Seine-Maritime department in the Normandy region in northern France. On 1 January 2016, it was merged into the new commune of Arelaune-en-Seine.

== Geography ==
A farming village situated in a meander of the river Seine, some 20 miles (32 km) northwest of Rouen at the junction of the D40, D65 and the D490 roads. The 60m high Pont de Brotonne bridge crosses the Seine at Saint-Nicolas-de-Bliquetuit.

== Places of interest ==
- The church of St. Nicholas, dating from the eleventh century.

== See also ==
- Communes of the Seine-Maritime department
