= Auguste-Jean-Gabriel de Caulaincourt =

French cavalry commander

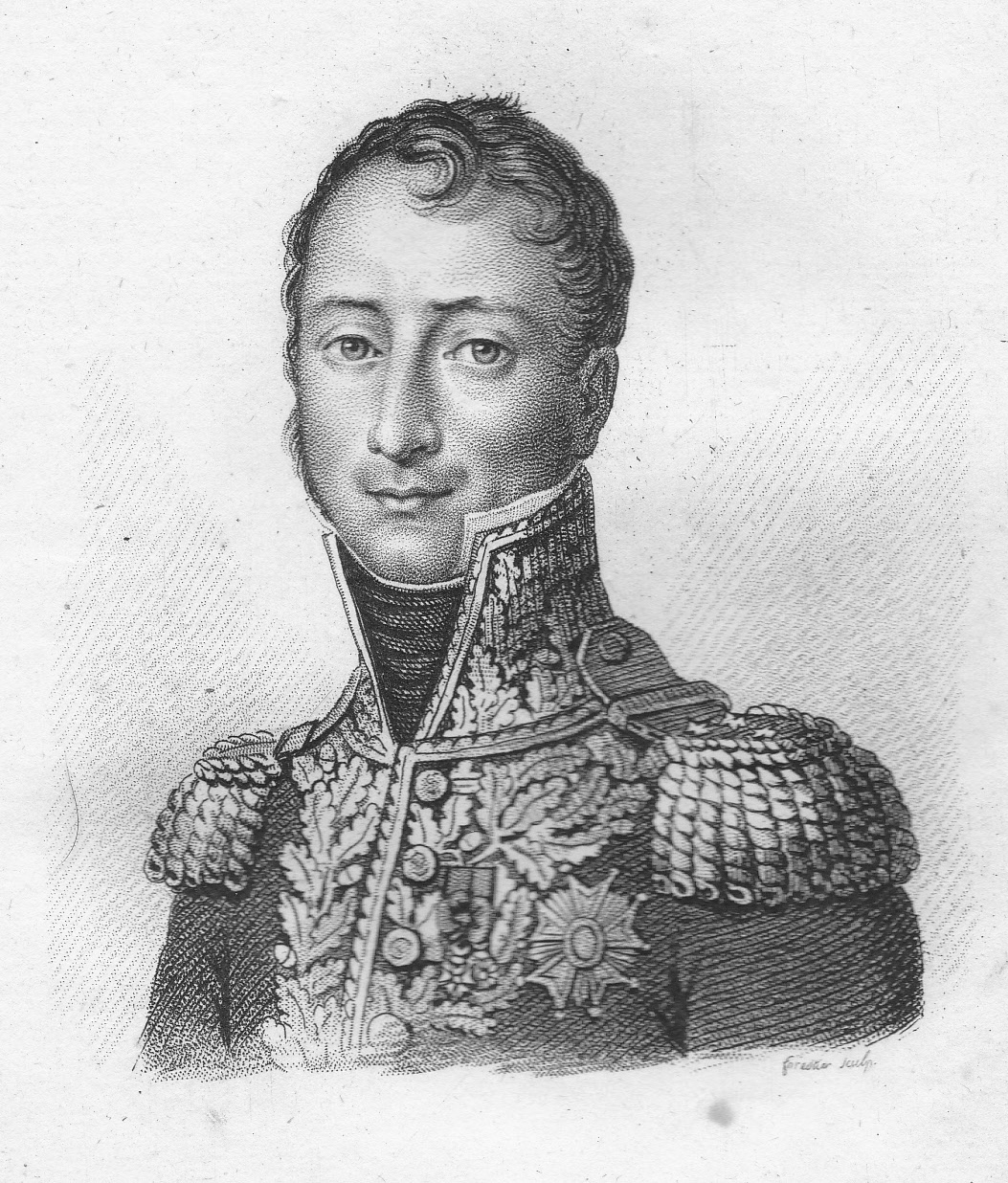
- General Count Auguste de Caulaincourt
- Born: 16 September 1777; Caulaincourt, Aisne, Kingdom of France
- Died: 7 September 1812 (aged 34); Borodino, Russian Empire
- Relatives: son of Gabriel-Louis de Caulaincourt brother of Armand Augustin Louis de Caulaincourt
- Military career
- Allegiance: France
- Branch: Cavalry
- Rank: General of Division
- Conflicts: French Revolutionary Wars, Napoleonic Wars
- Awards: Count of the Empire

Auguste-Jean-Gabriel, comte de Caulaincourt (French pronunciation: [oɡyst ʒɑ̃ ɡabʁjɛl də kolɛ̃kuʁ]; 16 September 1777 – 7 September 1812) was a French cavalry commander who rose to the rank of general during the First French Empire.

He was the son of French general and senator Gabriel-Louis de Caulaincourt and younger brother of general and diplomat Armand Augustin Louis de Caulaincourt.

== Revolutionary Wars ==
Following his older brother's footsteps, Auguste-Jean-Gabriel de Caulaincourt joined the army and, like his brother, became aide-de-camp to general d'Aubert Dubayet, in 1795. He was employed in the Armée du Rhin and subsequently served under general Masséna in the Switzerland campaign. Just after the battle of Zürich Masséna promoted him to the rank of chef d'escadron (squadron commander).

== Napoleonic Wars ==
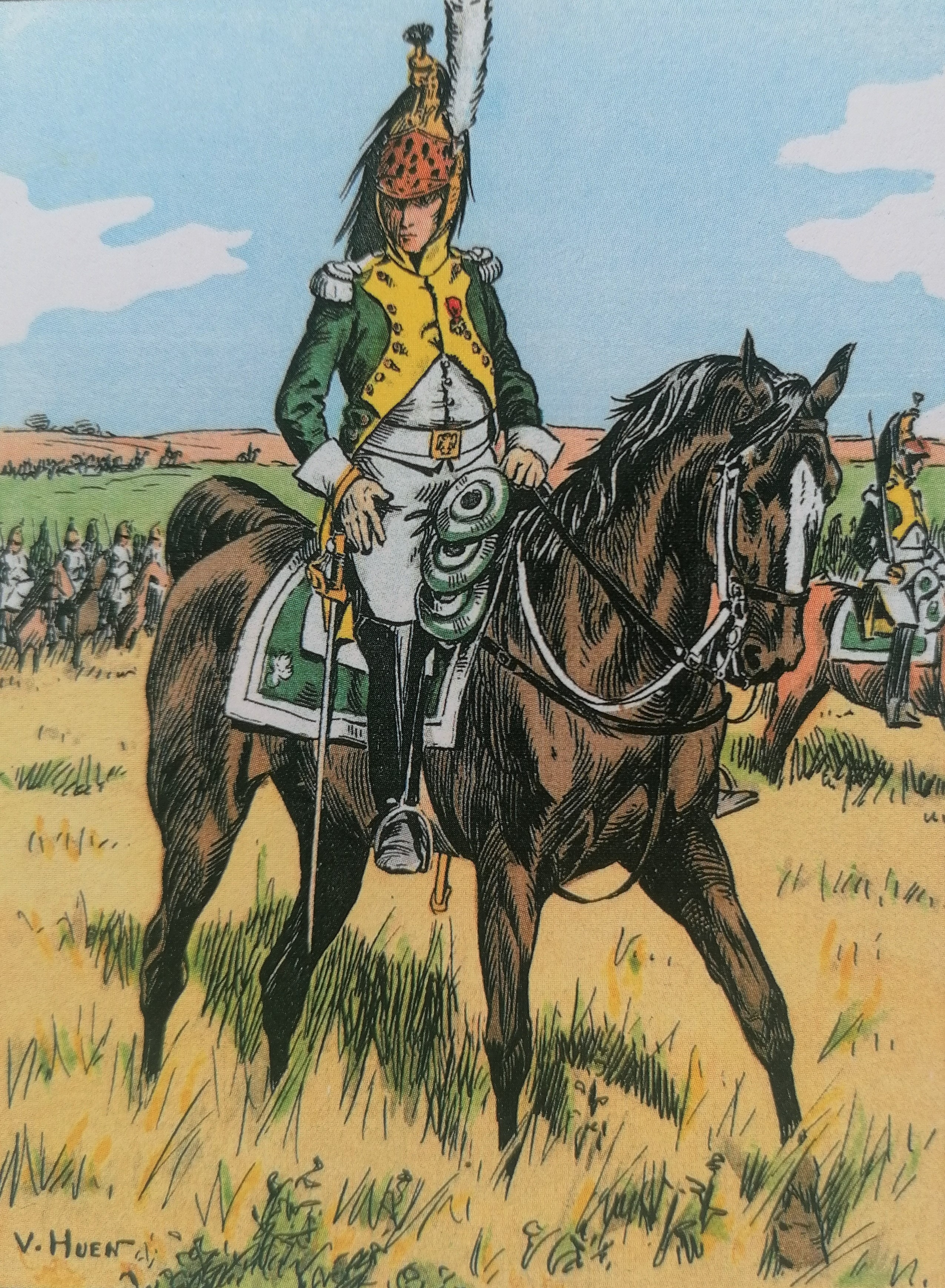
Portrait by Victor Huen of Caulaincourt in 1806 as chef de brigade of the 19th Regiment of Dragoons.

In 1804 Caulaincourt was appointed aide-de-camp to Louis Bonaparte, with the rank of chef de brigade (colonel) of a dragoon brigade. The next year he fought at the battle of Austerlitz and in 1806 he resumed his duties as aide-de-camp to Louis Bonaparte, who had become King of Holland. Louis also named him Grand Ecuyer ("Master of the Horse"), major-general, and Holland's plenipotentiary in the Kingdom of Naples. In 1808 Caulaincourt rejoined the French Army and was made général de brigade (brigadier general) and a baron of the Empire, just before being sent to fight in Spain. There he took Cuenca (3 July 1808), where he ordered the looting of the cathedral, and fought in several other skirmishes, which brought him the rank of général de division (general of division) and the command of all dragoon regiments in Spain.

Caulaincourt was badly wounded in early 1810 and spent time recovering in France, where he was called back to service in 1812 as part of the second Grande Armée that Napoleon I assembled with the purpose of invading Russia. Caulaincourt was killed at the Battle of Borodino on September 7, 1812, by a cannonball while leading the French assault of the great redoubt.

Napoleon thought very highly of Caulaincourt. During the Russian Campaign, Caulaincourt was given command of the Imperial general headquarters. Following his death at the Battle of Borodino, Napoleon told his brother, the Grand Ecuyer, Armand de Caulaincourt, the Duke of Vicenza, that his loss was a terrible blow and that he was being groomed for high command. Napoleon said: "[Caulaincourt] was a splendid man... He was my best cavalry officer. He had a quick eye, and he was brave. By the end of the campaign he would have replaced Murat [as commander of the Imperial cavalry corps]." Following his death, as a mark of esteem and for a lack of officers, as many died in battle, Napoleon promoted all the officers of Caulaincourt's staff.
