= Jean Adrien Bigonnet =

French politician (1755–1832)

Jean Adrien Bigonnet (French pronunciation: [ʒɑ̃ adʁijɛ̃ biɡɔnɛ]; 1755–1832) was a French revolutionist and republican who became a member of the Council of Five Hundred (1795–1799).

Bigonnet was a Representative during the Hundred Days and played a notable part in the abdication of Napoleon in 1815, by pointing out in the legislator during the debate on Napoleon's abdication that the Coalition were in arms to secure the Treaty of Paris (1814). The Treaty of Paris (1814) said that Napoleon and his family were excluded from the throne of France, so persuading the legislator that if Napoleon's young son (Napoleon II) was to be head of state on the abdication of Napoleon then the Coalition would continue the war.

== Works ==
- Corps Législatif. Conseil des Cinq-Cents. Opinion ... sur le projet de résolution relatif au calendrier républican, 1798
- Opinion dn i.e. du Bigonnet, sur les dépenses municipales et communales: Séance du 6 fructidor an 6. Corps législatif..., 1798
- Coup d'état du dix-huit brumaire, 1819
- Napoléon Bonaparte, considéré sous le rapport de son influence sur la Révolution, 1821
