= Antoine de Laforêt =

French diplomat

Antoine, comte de Laforêt
- Born: 8 August 1756; Aire-sur-la-Lys, Pas-de-Calais, France
- Died: 2 August 1846 (aged 89); Villefrancœur Loir-et-Cher, France
- Occupations: Diplomat, politician
- Known for: Minister of Foreign Affairs

Antoine René Charles Mathurin, comte de Laforêt (8 August 1756 – 2 August 1846 ) was a senior French diplomat. He was Consul General of France to the United States before the French Revolution. (Note: Also known as Antoine René Charles Mathurin, Compte de Laforêt or Comte de La Forêt or Count of Laforet) During the First French Empire he was Ambassador in Madrid. He was briefly Minister of Foreign Affairs during the transitional government after the fall of Napoleon in 1814, and in 1815, after second abdication of Napoleon, a plenipotentiary to the Seventh Coalition powers.

== Early years ==
Antoine René Charles Mathurin was born in Aire-sur-la-Lys, Pas-de-Calais, on 8 August 1756. In 1772 he was a sub-lieutenant in the Hainault regiment. He soon abandoned his military career to enter the diplomatic service. He joined the department of Foreign Affairs as a junior officer on 14 December 1774. In 1779 he was named secretary to the French legation in the United States, then vice-consul at Savannah, Philadelphia and New York. He was made Consul-General of France in the United States in 1788. As a consul Laforêt authored reports analyzing the U.S. Constitution and the likelihood of its ratification.

During this time, Mathurin acquired large tracts of land in Virginia, which he converted into a plantation. He also befriended political exile and fellow French nobleman Charles Maurice de Talleyrand-Périgord, collaborating with him in various business ventures. Talleyrand later played a significant role in Laforest's career advancement. Mathurin returned to France in September 1793 and became assistant to Jean Antoine Joseph Fauchet, Minister Plenipotentiary to the United States. They were dismissed on 5 November year III, but the next year on 17 July 1797 Talleyrand, head of the department of External Relations, put Laforest in charge of finance and accounting.

== Consulate and Empire ==
During the Consulate Mathurin was Director of Posts. Laforest accompanied Joseph Bonaparte to the Congress of Lunéville as first secretary of the legation, then was sent to Munich, and then to the Diet of Ratisbon as chargé d'affaires extraordinaire. He was awarded the Grand Cross of the Legion of Honor on 19 Vendémiaire year XII.

On 1 May 1805 Mathurin was named Minister Plenipotentiary in Berlin, and undertook his duties with honor during the Austerlitz campaign and the start of the war with Prussia. He was leaving for Russia when he received the order to proceed to Madrid as ambassador in 1808. He was created a Count of the Empire on 28 January 1809, as Comte Mathurin de Laforêt. He returned to France in 1813 and was given the mission of negotiating with Ferdinand VII of Spain, at Valençay, the treaty that returned that prince to Spain. Soon after he was awarded the Grand Cross of the Order of la Réunion.

== Later career ==
On the first Bourbon Restoration Mathurin de Laforêt was appointed interim Minister of Foreign Affairs in the provisional government from 3 April to 12 May 1814. He was charged with preparing the Treaty of Paris. As reward for his services he received the Grand Cordon on the Legion of Honor. After the return of Napoleon from Elba during the Hundred Days, on 11 May 1815 he was elected to the Chamber of Representatives for the department of Loir-et-Cher. On the second Bourbon Restoration he was named Minister Plenipotentiary to the Seventh Coalition powers. He was made a Peer of France on 5 March 1819. In 1825 he became a Minister of State and member of the Privy Council.

Mathurin lost his position and titles with the July Revolution of 1830. He died at his Château de Freschines, near Villefrancœur, Loir-et-Cher, on 2 August 1846.

== Notes ==
Political offices
Preceded by Armand Augustin Louis de Caulaincourt	Minister of Foreign Affairs; 3 April 1814 – 13 May 1814	Succeeded by Charles Maurice de Talleyrand-Périgord
