= Armand-Augustin-Louis de Caulaincourt =

French diplomat (1773–1827)

Armand de Caulaincourt
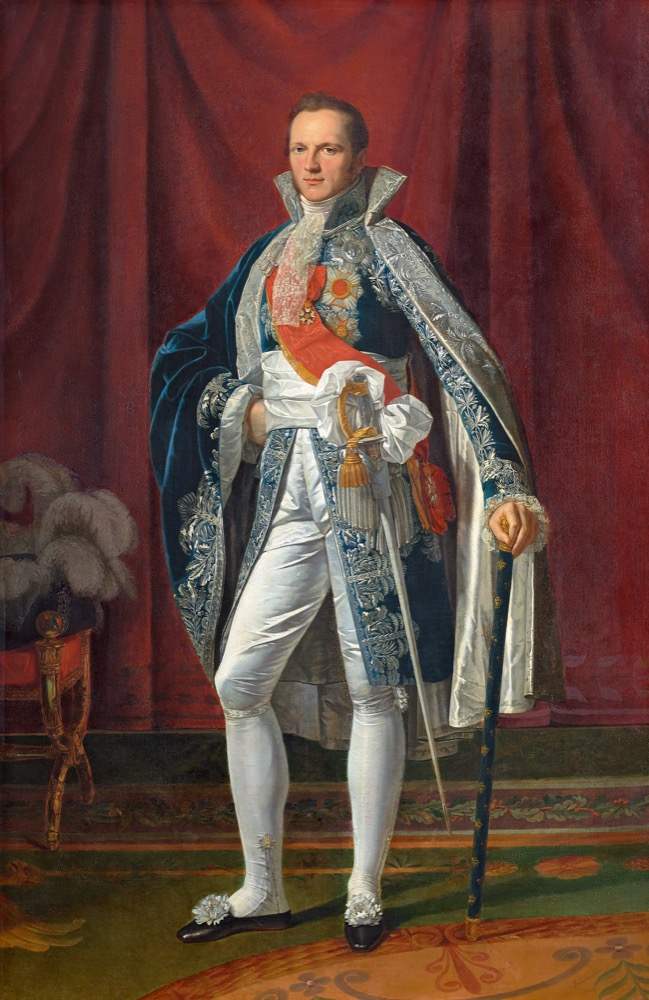
- Caulaincourt as Grand Squire (Grand ecuyer), by Féréol Bonnemaison (1806)
- Born: 9 December 1773; Caulaincourt, France
- Died: 19 February 1827 (aged 53); Paris, France
- Relatives: Gabriel Louis de Caulaincourt (father), Auguste-Jean-Gabriel de Caulaincourt (brother),
- Military career
- Allegiance: Kingdom of France; Kingdom of the French; French First Republic; First French Empire; Bourbon Restoration (1814–1815)
- Branch: Army
- Service years: 1788–1815
- Rank: General of division
- Conflicts: French Revolutionary Wars, Napoleonic Wars
- Awards: Name inscribed on the Arc de Triomphe, duc de Vicence
- Other work: Minister of Foreign Affairs, Grand Marshal of the Palace, Ambassador to Saint-Petersburg

Armand-Augustin-Louis de Caulaincourt, duc de Vicence (French pronunciation: [kolɛ̃kuʁ], 9 December 1773 – 19 February 1827), was a French military officer, diplomat and close advisor to Napoleon I.

== Early life and family ==
Coat of arms of the Caulaincourt family under the ancien régime

Armand de Caulaincourt was born into a noble family in the village of Caulaincourt, in the province of Picardy, northern France, on 9 December 1773. He was the eldest son of Marquis Louis-Gabriel de Caulaincourt (1740–1808) and Anne-Joséphine de Barandier de la Chaussé d'Eu (1751–1830), married in 1770. His father served in the French Army through the ancien régime and into the Republic, being made Count of the Empire by Napoleon shortly before his death in 1808. His grandfather, Marc-Louis de Caulaincourt, fought in the Third Silesian War and the Seven Years' War, reaching the rank of maréchal de camp.

== Military career ==
Caulaincourt began his military service on 13 January 1788, at the age of 14, when he joined the Royal Foreign Cavalry Regiment (Régiment Royal Étranger Cavalerie) stationed in Arras, at the time commanded by Alexandre de Lameth, a distant relative. Six months after the start of the French Revolution, he was promoted to second lieutenant in the now renamed 7th Cavalry Regiment in November 1789. Two years later he was requested by his father to serve as his aide-de-camp, which was approved by Minister of war Louis Duportail in November 1791.

At the outbreak of the French Revolutionary Wars in 1792 Caulaincourt had been promoted to captain and was serving as an adjutant on the staff of his uncle, Louis-Auguste Juvénal des Ursins d'Harville. His lineage as a noble made him suspect by the revolutionaries, causing Caulaincourt to volunteer to serve in the Paris National Guard as a common soldier. While on his way to join his regiment he was denounced as an aristocrat and thrown into prison. He escaped prison, and returned to serving in the army. In three years he had regained his previous rank and was serving General Lazare Hoche. He attained the rank of colonel in the Army of the Rhine. By 1801 Caulaincourt had been involved in thirteen campaigns and wounded twice.

== Diplomatic career ==
Caulaincourt was fluent in a number of languages, including Russian. After the peace of Lunéville in 1801 he was sent to Saint Petersburg by First Consul Napoleon Bonaparte. His mission was primarily to check British influence in the Russian court.

On his return he was named aide-de-camp of Napoleon. At this juncture an event occurred which was to profoundly affect his life. In 1804 Caulaincourt had been sent by Napoleon across the Rhine to seize some agents of the British government who were in Baden. He was used to pass on orders calling for the seizure and transport to Paris of Louis Antoine de Bourbon, the Duke of Enghien. Once in Paris the Duke of Enghien was tried for treason by a military tribunal and summarily executed. Caulaincourt, an aristocrat, had been used as a means to deliver a fellow aristocrat to his death. When Caulaincourt returned to Paris he learned of the Duke's execution, and wept openly over it. He was incensed that he had been used in this way, and the event forever gave supporters of the Bourbon monarchy a means by which to impugn Caulaincourt's integrity and honor. The shroud of idealism which had earlier colored his view of Napoleon was forever pulled away. From then on, though he treated Napoleon with courtesy, there was always a reserve, and he made a point to be frank in informing the Emperor of what he felt were the true motives behind the Emperor's policies. The event was a point of shame that would haunt Caulaincourt for the rest of his days.

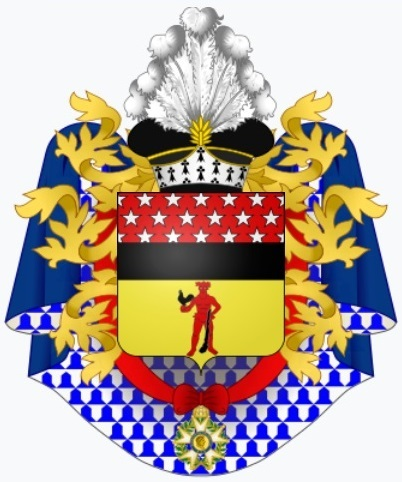
Heraldic achievement of Armand-Augustin-Louis de Caulaincourt, duc de Vicence

After the establishment of the empire he received various honors and in 1808 was given the title of Duke of Vicenza, a duché grand-fief. In 1807, Napoleon sent him as ambassador to St. Petersburg, where Caulaincourt endeavored to maintain the alliance of Tilsit between France and Russia. During this time he developed a friendship with the Tsar Alexander I. His tasks as ambassador included attempting to arrange a marriage between Napoleon and one of the sisters of the Tsar. Though nothing came of it, he was able to manage the negotiations without engendering an embarrassing rebuff upon the Emperor. In 1811, with Napoleon preparing to declare a change in policy with Russia, Caulaincourt was sent for to return to France. Napoleon wrote the Tsar to say the Duke was recalled to France because of the Duke's "poor state of health."

=== Russian campaign ===
In 1812, Caulaincourt strongly advised Napoleon against his proposed campaign into Russia. He was unsuccessful in dissuading the Emperor. He accompanied Napoleon as Grand Écuyer, or Master of the Horse, in which he was tasked with maintaining the horses of the Emperor and his close guard, and he had charge of the despatch riders and orderlies. He rode at the Emperor's left side, and was prepared to surrender his horse to him in case there was need. He was with the Emperor at the Battle of Borodino, when Caulaincourt's younger brother, Major-General Auguste-Jean-Gabriel de Caulaincourt, was killed while pressing forward the assault following the capture of the great redoubt.

During the French occupation of Moscow that followed, Caulaincourt repeatedly warned the Emperor of the dangers of wintering in Russia. The Emperor wanted to send him to St. Petersburg to negotiate terms of an armistice, but Caulaincourt declined, noting that the Tsar would not negotiate peace terms with the French while they were still in Moscow. During the subsequent French retreat from Moscow, Caulaincourt noted the disintegration of the army, and implored Napoleon to return directly to France to stabilize the political situation in Europe. Napoleon eventually did so, choosing Caulaincourt to travel alongside him in December 1812.

=== Return to France ===
The following month Caulaincourt was assigned the position of Grand Marshal of the Palace and charged with all diplomatic negotiations. He assumed this position following the death of the previous office holder, General Geraud Duroc. Caulaincourt signed the armistice of Pleswitz, June 1813, which suspended hostilities between France and Prussia and Russia for seven weeks. In the following negotiations, he represented France at the congress of Prague in August 1813, and at the Treaty of Fontainebleau on 10 April 1814. The provision for Napoleon on the island of Elba after his abdication is credited to Caulaincourt, who reportedly was able to influence the Tsar Alexander I for this disposition. During the First Restoration of the Bourbons that followed, Caulaincourt lived in obscure retirement.

With Napoleon's escape from Elba and his regaining power in France, Caulaincourt was chosen to serve as Napoleon's minister of foreign affairs. Caulaincourt tried to persuade Europe of the emperor's peaceful intentions during the Hundred Days, but he was unsuccessful in this, culminating in the War of the Seventh Coalition. Following Napoleon's second fall from power Caulaincourt's name was on the list of those proscribed for arrest and execution in what came to be known as the Second White Terror during the Second Restoration of the Bourbons. His name was removed from the list by the personal intervention of the Tsar Alexander I.

== Later life ==
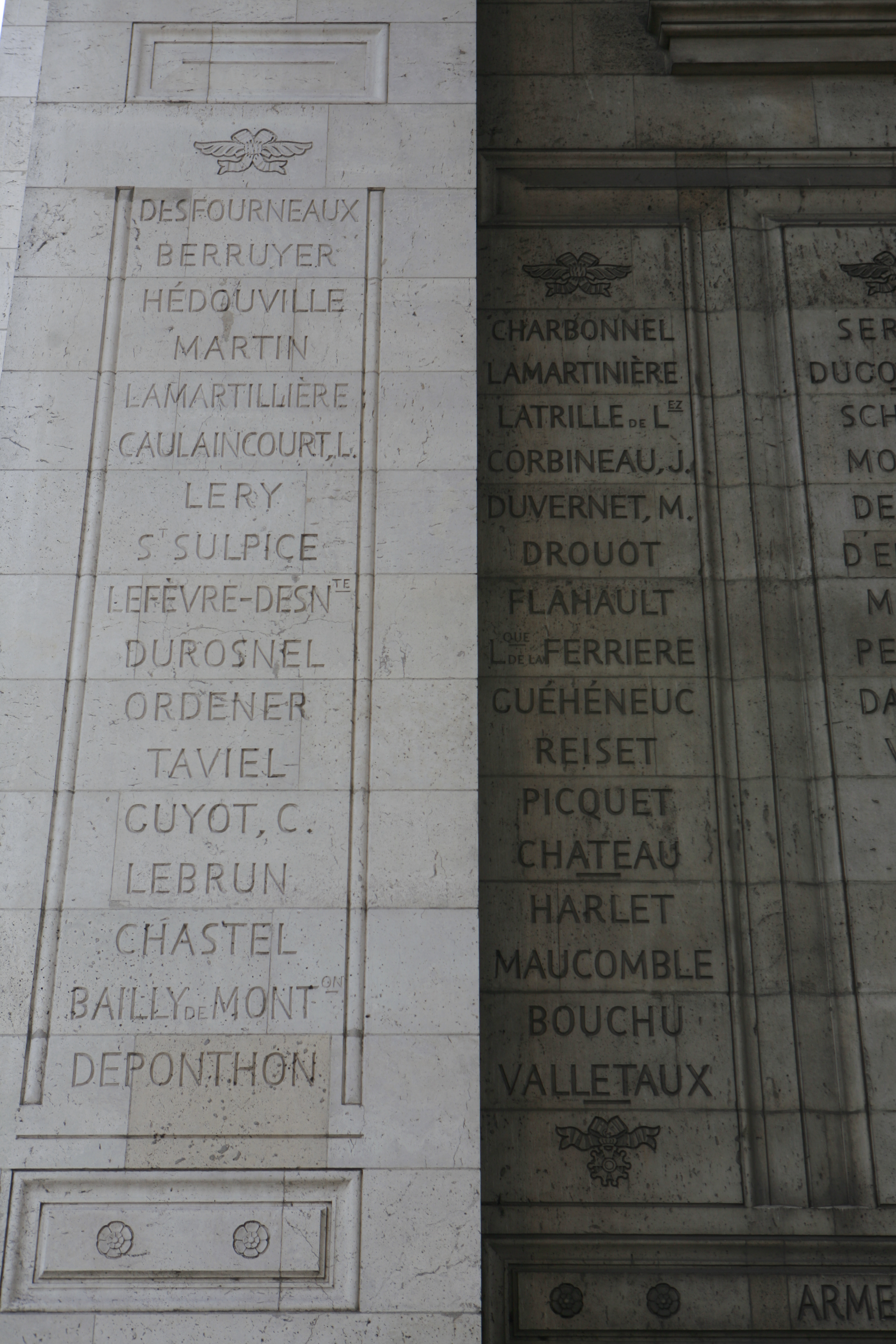
West pillar of the Arc de Triomphe. Caulaincourt's name is listed sixth from the top on the left side.

Caulaincourt lived in retirement in Paris. Of the politicians of the First Empire, he was one of the most loyal and faithful to Napoleon. Caulaincourt's name is engraved on the Arc de Triomphe's West pillar, and a street in Paris is named Rue Caulaincourt in his honor. His eldest son served as a senator during the rule of Napoleon III. Caulaincourt died in Paris in 1827 at the age of 53, following an illness with cancer of the stomach, the same illness as his former employer.

== Memoir ==
Caulaincourt had kept copious notes on his conversations with the Emperor Napoleon. In the 1820s a number of memoirs of the First Empire were published, written by individuals who had served with Napoleon. These seemed to rely on the retelling of events by Hugues-Bernard Maret, Duke of Bassano, who had served as a personal secretary of Napoleon. Caulaincourt believed these to be badly misrepresented conversations, individuals and events. In response Caulaincourt wrote his own memoir using his notes as reference. The work consisted of two independent parts. The first work records the discussions between the author and Napoleon just prior to the campaign in Russia, the events of the campaign, the occupation of Moscow, the fire that destroyed the city and the retreat that destroyed the Grande Armée. Following this is a recitation of Napoleon's analysis of events and the world situation as told to the author in the course of their journey to Paris. The second part of the memoir covered the period of 1813 through Napoleon's first abdication, and was still being worked upon at the time of the author's death.

The publication of Caulaincourt's memoir was delayed for a variety of reasons, and the work was eventually lost. Following the First World War the work was rediscovered, and efforts were made to prepare it for publication. After several years of work the entire memoir was published by Jean Hanoteau in 1933 with the title With Napoleon in Russia.

The work developed newfound significance with the events of the Second World War. Following the initial astonishing success of the German invasion of Russia in June 1941, military historian and theorist B. H. Liddell Hart coolly appraised the difficulties awaiting the Wehrmacht, citing Caulaincourt's work extensively in an article he published in the British magazine The Strand in October 1941. After the war, it was learned that Caulaincourt's With Napoleon in Russia was read with great interest by many German officers during their invasion of Russia. Friedrich von Mellenthin made reference to it in his memoir while describing the character of the Russian soldier, his stubbornness in defense, and his capacity to endure bombardments. General Günther von Kluge, commander of Army Group Center, reportedly often referred to the work. Liddell-Hart interviewed a great many German commanders after the war, and though Kluge did not survive he states General Günther Blumentritt recounted: "I can still see von Kluge trudging through the mud from his sleeping quarters to his office, and standing there before the map with Caulaincourt's book in his hand. That went on day after day."

Besides Liddell Hart, William Shirer, the author of the famous book, "The Rise and Fall of the Third Reich", also pointed briefly the impact of Caulaincourt's memoirs in the chapter, "A Turn of the Tide", when depicting the Battle of Moscow –

Now, Blumentritt remembered, the ghosts of the Grand Army, which had taken this same road to Moscow, and the memory of Napoleon’s fate began to haunt the dreams of the Nazi conquerors. The German generals began to read, or reread, Caulaincourt’s grim account of the French conqueror’s disastrous winter in Russia in 1812.

== Sources ==
- Bohn, H. G. (1854). The History of the Restoration of Monarchy in France.
- Caulaincourt, Armand-Augustin-Louis (1935). With Napoleon in Russia. Translated by Hanoteau, Jean. New York: Morrow.
- Chisholm, Hugh, ed. (1911). "Caulaincourt, Armand Louis" . Encyclopædia Britannica. Vol. 5 (11th ed.). Cambridge University Press. pp. 556–557.
- Fierro, Alfredo; Palluel-Guillard, André; Tulard, Jean (1995). Histoire et Dictionnaire du Consulat et de l'Empire (in French). Éditions Robert Laffont. ISBN 2-221-05858-5.
- Houssaye, H 1814 (Paris, 1888), and 1815 (Paris, 1893)
- Liddell Hart, B. H. (1948). The German Generals Talk. New York, NY: Morrow.
- Liddell Hart, B. H. (1970). History of the Second World War. New York, NY: Putnam.
- von Mellenthin, Friedrich-Wilhelm (1956). Panzer Battles. Old Saybrook, CT: Konecky & Konecky. ISBN 1-56852-578-8.
- Tatischeff, Alexandre I et Napoleon (Paris, 1892)
- Vandal, Albert Napoleon et Alexandre (Paris, 1891–1895)

Political offices
Preceded by Hugues-Bernard Maret, Duc de Bassano	Minister of Foreign Affairs; 20 November 1813 – 1 April 1814	Succeeded by Antoine René Charles Mathurin, comte de Laforest
Preceded by Charles Maurice de Talleyrand	Minister of Foreign Affairs; 20 March 1815 – 22 June 1815	Succeeded by Louis Pierre Edouard, Baron Bignon
