= La Mailleraye-sur-Seine =

- Part of Arelaune-en-Seine
- Location of La Mailleraye-sur-Seine
- Location within France Location within Normandy
- Coordinates: 49°28′59″N 0°46′23″E
- Country: France
- Region: Normandy
- Department: Seine-Maritime
- Arrondissement: Rouen
- Canton: Notre-Dame-de-Gravenchon
- Commune: Arelaune-en-Seine
- Area^{1}: 44.58 km^{2} (17.21 sq mi)
- Elevation: 6 m (20 ft)
- Highest elevation: 136 m (446 ft)
- Lowest elevation: 0 m (0 ft)
- Population (2022): 1,906
  - Density: 42.75/km^{2} (110.7/sq mi)
- Time zone: UTC+01:00 (CET)
  - Summer (DST): UTC+02:00 (CEST)
- Postal code: 76940
- ^{1} French Land Register data, which excludes lakes, ponds, glaciers > 1 km^{2} (0.386 sq mi or 247 acres) and river estuaries.

La Mailleraye-sur-Seine (French pronunciation: [la majʁɛ syʁ sɛn]) is a former commune in the Seine-Maritime department in the Normandy region in northern France. On 1 January 2016, it was merged into the new commune of Arelaune-en-Seine.

== Geography ==
A very large village (in area) of forestry and farming situated by the banks of the river Seine, some 16 miles (26 km) west of Rouen, at the junction of the D65, D131 and the D490 roads.

== Heraldry ==
Arms of La Mailleraye-sur-Seine	The arms of La Mailleraye-sur-Seine are blazoned : Gules, fretty Or.

== Population ==
Historical population
Year	Pop.	±% p.a.
1962	1,618	—
1968	1,601	−0.18%
1975	1,670	+0.60%
1982	1,694	+0.20%
1990	1,810	+0.83%
1999	1,833	+0.14%
2006	1,900	+0.51%
2022	1,906	+0.02%
Source: EHESS and INSEE

== Places of interest ==
- The church of St.Mathurin, dating from the sixteenth century.
- The remains of a feudal castle.
- A chapel dating from the sixteenth century.
- Some Roman ruins.
- The twelfth century Torps priory.

== See also ==
- Communes of the Seine-Maritime department
