= François Andréossy =

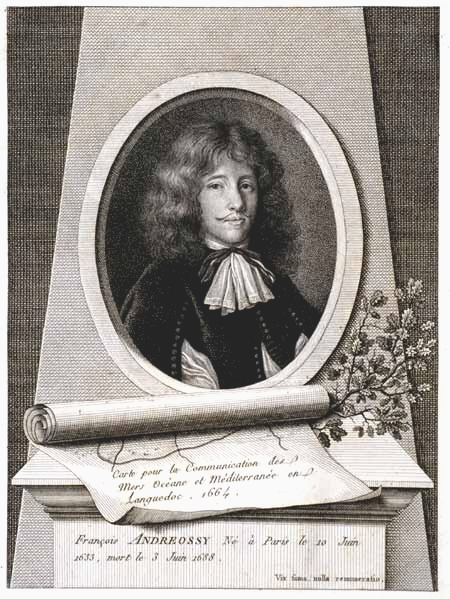
François Andréossy

François Andréossy (1633–1688) was a French engineer, cartographer, and a citizen of Narbonne. He was born in Paris on 10 June 1633. After completing his engineering studies in Paris, Andréossy went to Italy in 1660 to study Italian canal technology in Lombardy and Padua. He returned from the trip and sought out Pierre-Paul Riquet as a patron. Riquet was beginning his investigation into the possibility of building a canal across southern France from the Atlantic to the Mediterranean. Andréossy supplied the technical expertise that Riquet lacked and became Riquet's right-hand man throughout the construction of the canal.

He was also responsible for the levelling and the drawing of maps. He monitored the construction and assisted Riquet until Riquet's death. Andréossy continued to work at the canal and serve the family of Riquet until he died in Castelnaudary on 3 June 1688.

Andréossy's descendants continued like him for a century. His great-grandson, the general Antoine-François Andréossy, argued in his Histoire du Canal du Midi that his ancestor should be considered the father of the Canal du Midi, instead of Riquet.
