= Antoine-François Andréossy =

Franco-Italian nobleman, artillery general, diplomat and parliamentarian

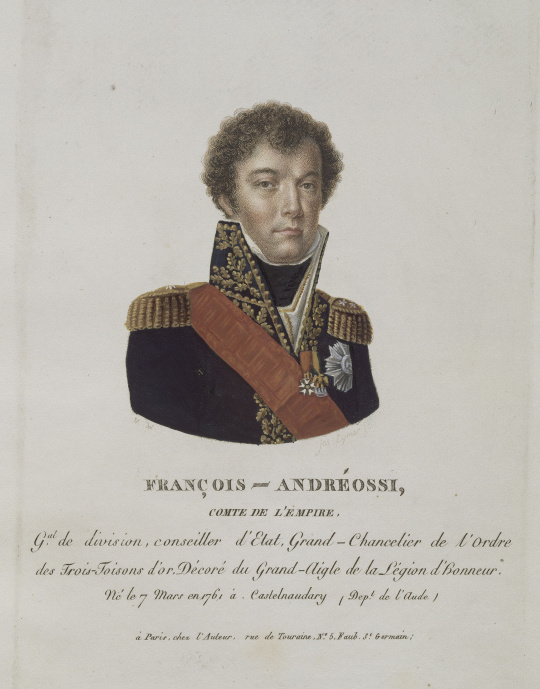
- Portrait of Andréossy
- Born: 6 March 1761; Castelnaudary, Languedoc
- Died: 10 September 1828 (aged 67); Montauban
- Relatives: Dr. François Andréossi (great-grandfather)
- Military career
- Allegiance: Kingdom of France; Kingdom of the French; French First Republic; First French Empire; Bourbon Restoration (France)
- Branch: French Army
- Rank: General
- Nickname: Italian: Antonio Andreossi
- Conflicts: Dutch Civil War; French Revolutionary Wars; Battle of the Bridge of Arcole; Siege of Mantua; Napoleonic Wars
- Other work: Ambassador to Great Britain; Ambassador to Austrian Empire; Ambassador to Ottoman Empire; Deputy of the French Parliament

Antoine-François, comte Andréossy (6 March 1761 – 10 September 1828) was a Franco-Italian nobleman, who served as a French Army artillery general, diplomat and parliamentarian.

== Biography ==
Born at Castelnaudary in Languedoc (now in Aude), scion of an ancient Italian minor noble family from Lucca, he was a great-grandson of the celebrated civil engineer and architect of the Canal du Midi, François Andréossy (1633-1688). An outstanding officer cadet at the Metz School of Artillery, Andréossy was commissioned in the Régiment Royal-Artillerie in 1781, seeing action in the Dutch Civil War (1787); he was promoted as Captain in 1788.

On the outbreak of the Revolution he adopted its principles. At the start of the Revolutionary Wars he saw active service on the Rhine in 1794 and in Italy in 1795, and in the campaign of 1796–1797 under Napoleon Bonaparte on engineer duties, commanding the bridging train of the French Army of Italy after June 1796, and fought with distinction at the Battle of the Bridge of Arcole and the Siege of Mantua..

Andréossy was promoted to brigade general in 1798, in the same year he accompanied Bonaparte to Egypt. He served in the French invasion of Egypt and Syria with distinction—he commanded the French flotilla on the Nile, before serving as Louis Alexandre Berthier's aide-de-camp during Bonaparte's invasion of Ottoman Syria—and was selected as one of Napoleon's companions on his return to Europe.

1803 cartoon by James Gillray showing Andréossy (right) holding a hat containing British conquests returned by William Pitt the Younger

Andréossy took part in the coup d'état of the 18 Brumaire, and on 6 January 1800 was promoted to divisional general. Of particular importance was his term of office as the French ambassador to the United Kingdom during the Peace of Amiens. Andréossy repeatedly warned Napoleon that the British government desired to maintain peace but must be treated with consideration. His advice, however, was disregarded. When Napoleon became emperor he made Andréossy inspector-general of artillery, a Chevalier de l'Empire in 1803 and on 24 February 1809 a Count of the Empire.

In the war of 1805 Andréossy was employed on the headquarters staff of Napoleon. From 1808 to 1809 he was French ambassador to the Austrian Empire, where he displayed a hostility to the Austrian Empire which was in marked contrast to his friendliness to England in 1802–1803. In the war of 1809, Andréossy was military governor of Vienna during the French occupation.

In 1812 he was sent by Napoleon as Ambassador to The Porte in Constantinople, where he carried on the policy initiated by Sébastiani. Shortly after his arrival, he was implicated in the death of the senior Greek official Panagios Mourousi, who deputised for his brother Demetrious as Dragoman of the Porte. After France began its invasion of Russia in June 1812, Andréossy declared that he could not treat with the Ottoman government through an interpreter attached to the Russian interest. Mourousi was first dismissed and then taken under guard to the Porte, where he was beheaded. In 1814 Andréossy was recalled from Constantinople by Louis XVIII.

Andréossy then retired into private life, until the escape of Napoleon from Elba once again called him forth. He accepted the office of head of the War Department. After the defeat at Waterloo and the abdication of Napoleon, he was one of the five commissioners sent to negotiate with the Coalition powers, on which occasion he gave his consent to the recall of Louis XVIII.

Andréossy held high administrative office under the Bourbon Restoration, including Chief of General Staff and Councillor of State. He was awarded honorary fellowship of the Académie des Sciences Morales et Politiques in 1826, He was later elected to the Chamber of Deputies in 1827, representing Aude as Deputy until his death in 1828. His name is inscribed in his memory under the Arc de Triomphe.

== Works ==
Andréossy's numerous works included the following:

- on artillery (with which arm he was most intimately connected throughout his military career):
  - Quelques idées relatives à l'usage de l'artillerie dans l'attaque et ... la défense des places (Metz);
  - Essai sur le tir des projectiles creux (Paris, 1826);
- on military history:
  - Campagne sur le Main el la Rednitz de l'armée gallo-batave (Paris, 1802);
  - Opérations des pontonniers en Italie . . . 1795-1796 (Paris, 1843).

Andréossy also wrote scientific memoirs on the mouth of the Black Sea (1818-1819); on certain Egyptian lakes (during his stay in Egypt); and in particular the history of the Languedoc Canal (Histoire du canal du Midi, 2nd ed., Paris, 1804), the chief credit of which he claimed for his ancestor. Andréossy died at Montauban in 1828.

== Family ==
On 15 September 1810, Andréossy married Marie-Florimonde-Stéphanie de Faÿ, daughter of Charles, marquis de La Tour-Maubourg. Their only son, Étienne-Auguste (1811-1835), succeeded as the 2nd Count Andréossy in 1828 and was also a promising French Army officer but died unmarried in a riding accident, when the title became extinct; the Dowager Countess Stéphanie died on 21 February 1868 in Haute-Garonne.

== Honours and titles ==
=== Titles ===
- – Knight of the Empire
- – Count of the Empire

=== Honours ===
- – Grand-croix, Order of Saint Louis
- – Grand-officier, Ordre de la Légion d'honneur
- – Chevalier, Order of Malta
- – Commandeur, Orders of Our Lady of Mount Carmel and St Lazarus
- – Grand-chancelier, Order of the Golden Fleece

== See also ==
- French Revolutionary Wars: campaigns of 1798
- List of Ambassadors of France to the United Kingdom
- Armorial of Counts of the French Empire (in French)
