= Louis Pierre Édouard, Baron Bignon =

French diplomat and historian (1771–1841)

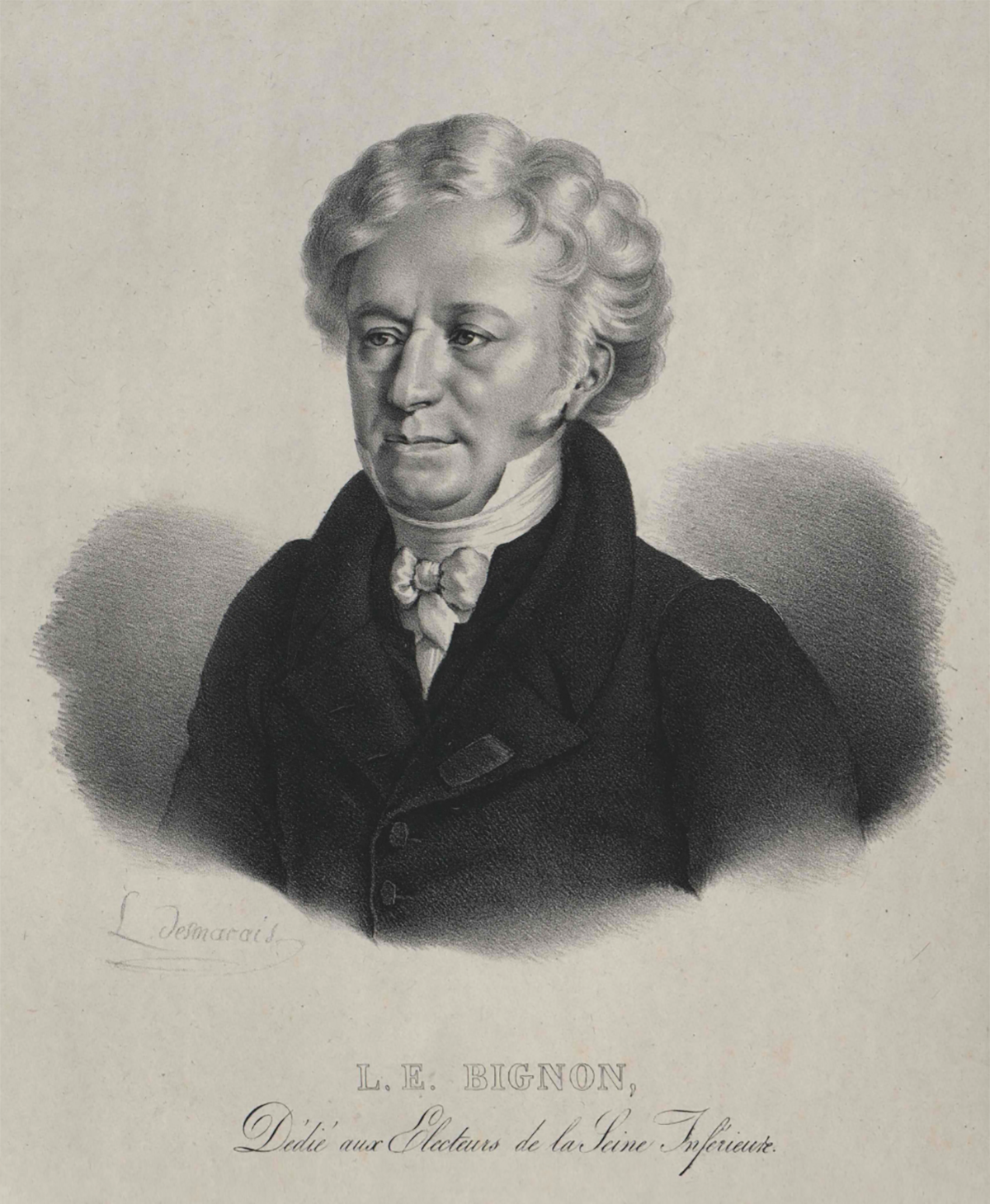
Louis de Bignon

Louis Pierre Édouard, Baron Bignon (3 January 1771 in La Mailleraye-sur-Seine – 6 January 1841) was a French diplomat and historian.

== Biography ==
Louis de Bignon was born at La Mailleraye-sur-Seine, Seine-Maritime, the son of a dyer. Although he had received a good education, he served throughout the early part of the French Revolutionary Wars without rising above the rank of private. In 1797, however, the attention of Talleyrand, then minister of foreign affairs was called to his exceptional abilities by General Huet, and he was attached to the diplomatic service.

After serving in the legations in Switzerland and the Cisalpine Republic, he was appointed in 1799 attaché to the French legation at Berlin, three years later he became chargé d'affaires. As minister-plenipotentiary at Cassel, between the years 1804 and 1806, he took a prominent share in the formation of the confederation of the Rhine; and after the battle of Jena he returned to Prussia as the administrator of the public domains and finances. He filled a similar function in Austria after the battle of Wagram. At the end of 1810, he became a French resident at Warsaw and was for a couple of years supreme in the affairs of the Grand Duchy of Warsaw.

The preparation of a constitution for Poland, on which he was engaged, was, however, interrupted by the events of 1812. Bignon, after a short imprisonment at the hands of the allies, returned to France in time to witness the downfall of Napoleon. During the Hundred Days he once more entered Napoleon's service, and, after the Battle of Waterloo, as minister of foreign affairs under the executive commission, it was he who signed the Convention of St. Cloud of 3 July 1815, by which Paris was handed over to the allies.

Bignon did not re-enter public life until 1817 when he was elected to the chamber of deputies, in which he sat until 1830, consistent in his opposition to the reactionary policy of successive governments. His great reputation and his diplomatic experience gave a special weight to the attacks which he published on the policy of the continental allies, two of his works attracting special attention, Du congrès de Troppau ou Examen des prétentions des monarchies absolues à l’égard de la monarchie constitutionnelle de Naples (Paris, 1821), and Les Cabinets et les peuples depuis 1815 jusqu’à la fin de 1822 (Paris, 1822).

The July Revolution, which brought his party into power, only led to a very temporary resumption of office by Bignon. He was for a few weeks minister of foreign affairs in the first government of Louis Philippe, and again for a few weeks minister of public instruction. But the idea of making him responsible for the foreign policy of France could not be realized owing to the necessity under which Louis Philippe lay of courting the goodwill of the powers, whom Bignon had offended by his outspoken writings.

Elected deputy in 1831 and member of the chamber of peers in 1839, he withdrew for the most part from politics to devote himself to his great work, the Histoire de France sous Napoleon (10 vols. 1829–1838, then 4 posthumous vols., 1847–1850). This history, while suffering the limitations of all contemporaneous narratives, contains much that does not exist elsewhere, and is one of the best-known sources for the later histories of Napoleon's reign. In his will, Napoleon had granted Bignon 100,000 francs and charged him "to write the history of French diplomacy from 1792 to 1815," although the money was never delivered.
