= Nicolas Marie Quinette =

French politician (1762–1821)

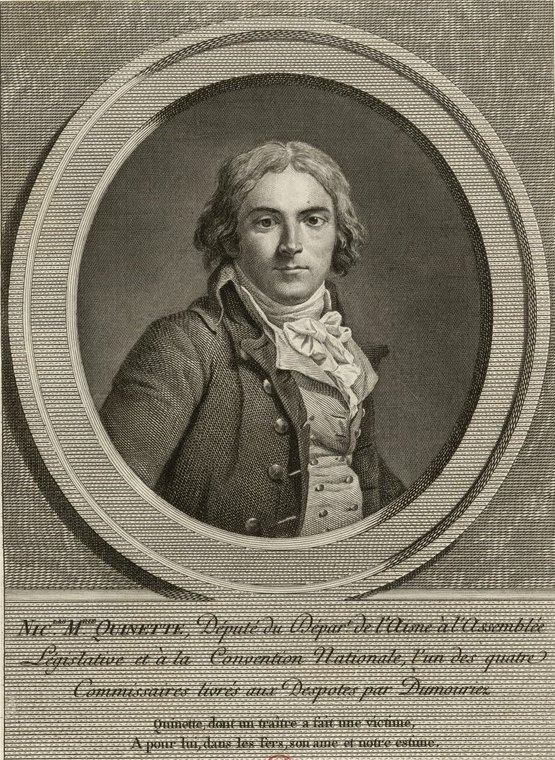
- Portrait of Nicolas Marie Quinette,1821 by an unknown artist
- Born: 16 September 1762; Paris
- Died: 14 June 1821 (aged 58) Brussels

Nicolas Marie Quinette, Baron de Rochemont (16 September 1762 in Paris – 14 June 1821 in Brussels) was a French politician.

He was a notary in Soissons. He was elected to the Legislative Assembly in 1791, a member of the Convention, and Member of the Council of Five Hundred, and Interior Minister.

He was a commissioner in the inquiry of Charles François Dumouriez, was captured by the Austrians, and exchanged for Madame Royale, Marie Thérèse of France, daughter of Louis XVI.

In 1796, he presided over the Council of Five Hundred from 21 November 1796 to 20 December. During the Hundred Days, on 2 June 1815, he sat in the Imperial House of Peers.

== Legislative Terms ==
- 9 September 1791 – 20 September 1792: Aisne - Extrème Left
- 4 September 1792 – 26 October 1795: Aisne - Left
- 15 October 1795 – 26 December 1799: Ain - Bonapartiste

Political offices
Preceded by Nicolas-Louis François de Neufchâteau	Minister of the Interior; 22 June 1799 – 10 November 1799	Succeeded by Pierre Simon de Laplace
