= Pierre-François Flaugergues =

French lawyer and politician

Pierre-François Flaugergues (1767–1836) was a French lawyer who took an active part in national politics between January 1813 and September 1816.

== Biography ==
Flaugergues was born on 14 January 1767 in Saint-Cyprien, Aveyron. He was a member of the National Assembly and the Chamber of Deputies representing:

- Aveyron (6 January 1813 – 4 June 1814) — Sat with the opposition.
- Aveyron (4 June 1814 – 20 March ) — Sat with the Royalists.
- Aveyron (15 May 1815 – 13 July 1815) — Sat with the opposition.
- Aveyron (22 August 1815 – 5 September 1816) — Sat with the moderates.

He died on 31 October 1836 in Brie, Ariège.

In December 1813 he was a member of the committee of three that prepared an address to Napoleon Bonaparte on the state of the nation. On 21 June 1815 shortly after the French defeat at the Battle of Waterloo and shortly before the abdication of Napoleon Boneparte as Emperor of the French, Flaugergues was on the commission of five members consisting of the President and Vice presidents of the Chamber of Deputies, to collect, in concert with the Cabinet and with a Committee from the House of Peers, the fullest information upon the state of France, and to propose suitable measures of safety. Their findings, while not recommending his abdication, made Napoleon's position untenable and he abdicated on 25 June 1815. Flaugergues was one of five commissioners appointed by the French Provisional Government to negotiate peace terms with the Duke of Wellington and Prince Blücher, the commanders of the advancing Coalition armies.
