= Caulaincourt, Aisne =

Commune in northern France

Caulaincourt
- Commune
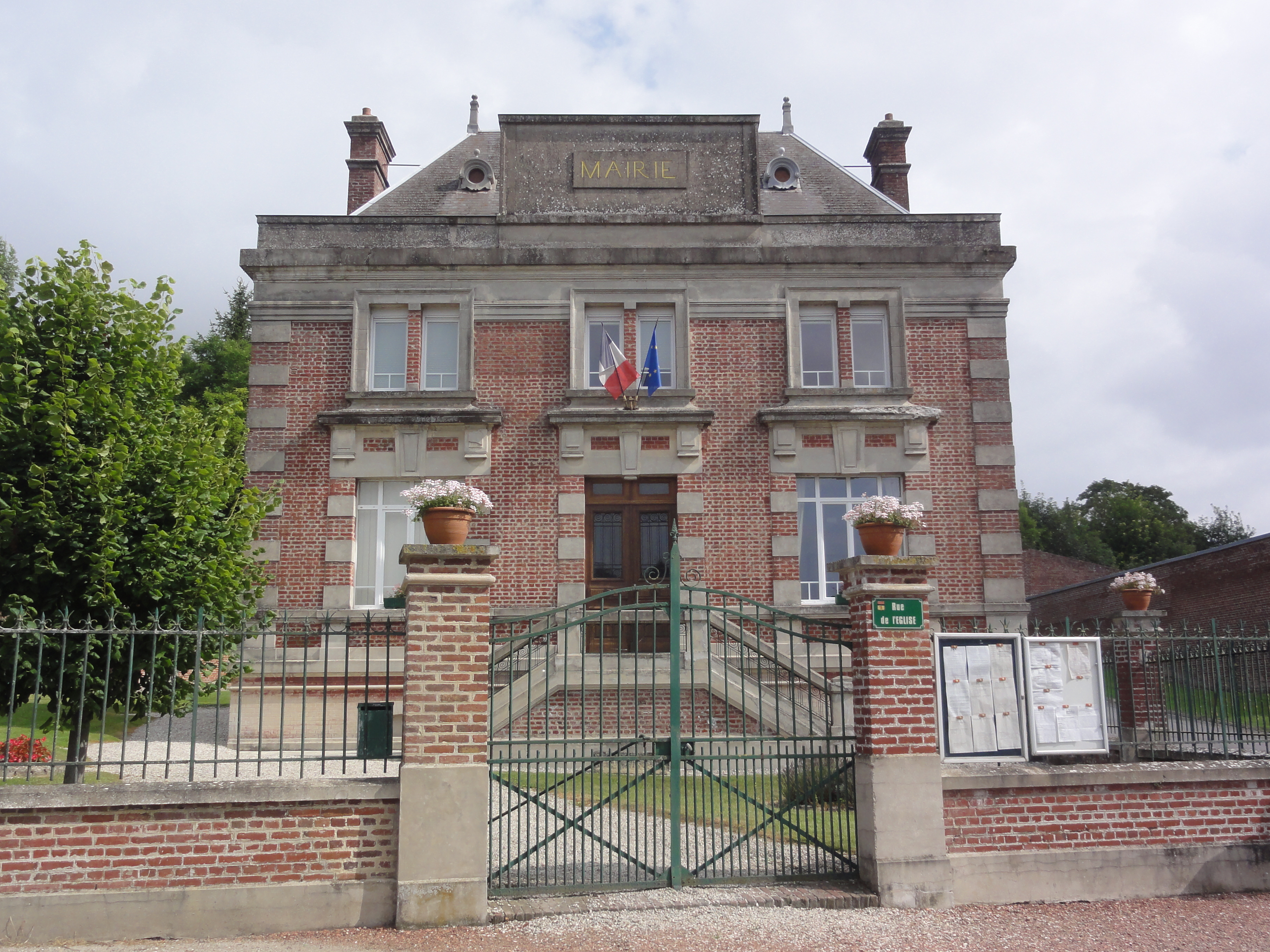
- The town hall of Caulaincourt

- Coat of arms
- Location of Caulaincourt
- Location within France Location within Hauts-de-France
- Coordinates: 49°51′54″N 3°06′25″E
- Country: France
- Region: Hauts-de-France
- Department: Aisne
- Arrondissement: Saint-Quentin
- Canton: Saint-Quentin-1
- Intercommunality: Pays du Vermandois

Government
  - Mayor (2026–32): Catherine Oblez
- Area^{1}: 5.96 km^{2} (2.30 sq mi)
- Elevation: 70 m (230 ft)
- Highest elevation: 104 m (341 ft)
- Lowest elevation: 60 m (200 ft)
- Population (2023): 143
  - Density: 24.0/km^{2} (62.1/sq mi)
- Time zone: UTC+01:00 (CET)
  - Summer (DST): UTC+02:00 (CEST)
- INSEE/Postal code: 02144 /02490
- ^{1} French Land Register data, which excludes lakes, ponds, glaciers > 1 km^{2} (0.386 sq mi or 247 acres) and river estuaries.

Caulaincourt (French pronunciation: [kolɛ̃kuʁ]) is a commune in the Aisne department in Hauts-de-France in northern France.

== Population ==
Historical population
Year	Pop.	±% p.a.
1968	139	—
1975	134	−0.52%
1982	122	−1.33%
1990	110	−1.29%
1999	121	+1.06%
2007	118	−0.31%
2012	138	+3.18%
2017	145	+0.99%
2023	143	−0.23%
Source: INSEE

== See also ==
- Communes of the Aisne department
