= Alfred Torrens =

English cricketer and British Army officer

Personal information
- Full name: Alfred Torrens
- Born: 26 December 1831; Agra, British India
- Died: 22 January 1903 (aged 71); Hayes, Kent, England
- Batting: Unknown
- Relatives: William Torrens (son); Attwood Torrens (brother)

Domestic team information
- Years: Team
- 1855: Marylebone Cricket Club

Career statistics
Competition	First-class
Matches	2
Runs scored	19
Batting average	6.33
100s/50s	–/–
Top score	16
Catches/stumpings	1/–
- Source: Cricinfo, 11 August 2021

Alfred Torrens (26 December 1831 — 22 January 1903) was an English first-class cricketer and British Army officer.

The son of the British Army General Robert Torrens, he was born in British India at Agra in December 1831. He was educated in England at Harrow School, where he played for the school cricket eleven. He played four Public Schools matches and on the winning in all four matches. After completing his education, Torrens was commissioned in the British Army as an ensign in the 66th Foot in March 1849, later purchasing the rank of lieutenant in October 1851. He was purchased the rank of captain in February 1855. He played two first-class cricket matches for the Marylebone Cricket Club later in 1855 against the Gentlemen of England at Lord's and the Surrey Club at The Oval. He scored 19 runs in his two matches, with a high score of 16. Torrens retired from active military service in August 1867, although the following year he was appointed an adjutant in the Surrey Rifle Volunteer Corps. He later retired from this appointment in 1876. Torrens was a member of the West Kent Cricket Club and was an original member of the nomadic I Zingari club. He lived out his final years at Baston Manor in Hayes, where he died suddenly on 22 January 1901. His sons Attwood and William both played first-class cricket.
