= Hans Ernst Karl, Graf von Zieten =

Field Marshal of Prussia (1770–1848)

Generalfeldmarschall Hans Ernst Karl Graf von Zieten
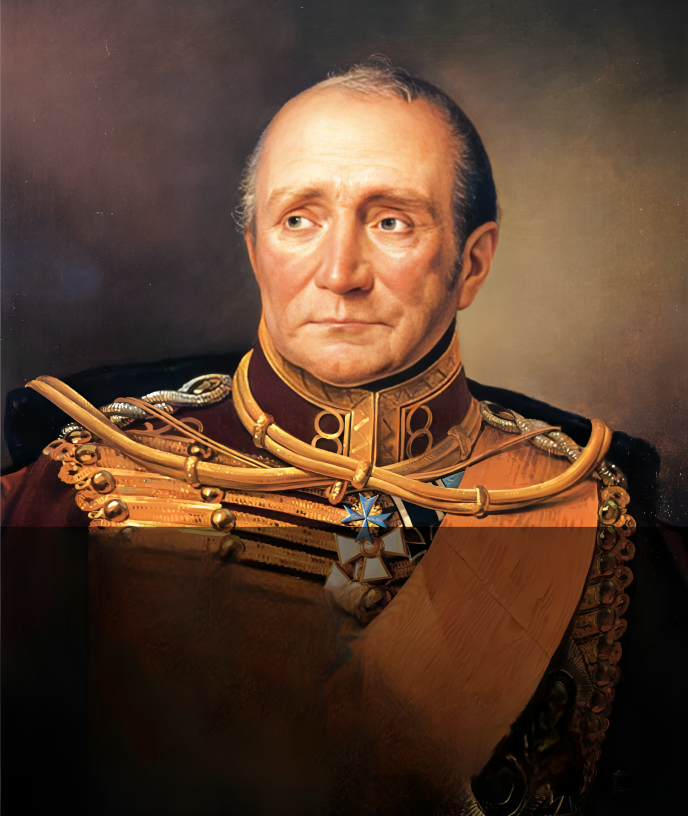
- Portrait by Franz Krüger, c. 1848
- Born: 5 March 1770; Dechtow, Holy Roman Empire
- Died: 3 May 1848, (Aged 78); Warmbrunn, Kingdom of Prussia
- Spouse: Josephine Clementine Gräfin von Berlo-Suys (m. 1797; died 1814)
- Children: 3
- Military career
- Allegiance: Kingdom of Prussia
- Branch: Prussian Army
- Service years: 1789–1839
- Rank: Generalfeldmarshall
- Unit: Zieten Hussars
- Commands: I Prussian Corps
- Conflicts: See battles: French Revolutionary Wars; War of the First Coalition; Battle of Kaiserslautern; Napoleonic Wars; War of the Fourth Coalition; Battle of Auerstädt; Battle of Eylau; War of the Sixth Coalition; German Campaign; Battle of Lutzen; Battle of Haynau; Battle of Dresden; Battle of Kulm; Battle of Leipzig; Campaign in France; Battle of Vauchamps; Battle of Laon; Hundred Days; Waterloo Campaign; Battle of Gilly; Battle of Ligny; Battle of Waterloo; Battle of Issy; Occupation of Paris
- Awards: Iron Cross; Black Eagle Order; Red Eagle Order; Pour le Mérite; Order of the Bath; Order of St. Andrew; Order of Alexander Nevsky

Hans Friedrich Ernst Wieprecht Karl von Zieten, as of 1817 Graf von Zieten (in earlier sources referred to as Hans Ernst Karl Graf von Zieten, sometimes also Ziethen; 5 March 1770 – 3 May 1848), was a Prussian Field Marshal who was prominent during the Napoleonic Wars, particularly in the Hundred Days where he took part in several battles in the Waterloo Campaign such as the Battle of Ligny and the Battle of Issy.

== Early life ==
He was born in Dechtow in the Margraviate of Brandenburg; he was not related to the Frederician general Hans Joachim von Zieten.

He became an adjutant to the then lieutenant general, later field marshal, Count von Kalkreuth, who gained dubious fame in Prussian military history. He accompanied him during the campaigns on the Rhine, particularly the Battle of Kaiserslautern, and remained with him for a total of fourteen years. On December 7, 1793, he became a captain in the army, on November 11, 1799, he became inspection adjutant of the West and South Prussian cavalry inspection, and on June 12, 1800, he was promoted to major. In the meantime, he married Countess Josephine Clementine von Berlo-Suys from a Luxembourg family on January 31, 1797, who was born on January 2, 1776.

== Napoleonic Wars ==
=== Fourth Coalition ===
After the Battle of Auerstädt, Kalkreuth sent him to negotiate a twelve-hour ceasefire with Davout for the burial of the dead and the evacuation of the wounded, which Davout, however, refused. During the Battle of Eylau, he commanded the 1st Hussar (Outpost) Brigade (4 squadrons of Württemberg Hussars, Fusilier Battalion Wakenitz, a half-mounted battery) and soon found the opportunity to demonstrate his talent as a commander. Promoted to lieutenant colonel on May 21, 1807, after the Battle of Friedland, he had to cover the retreat of L'Estocq's Corps on the road to Königsberg, suffering significant losses in his brigade. At Labiau, he engaged in a fierce battle on the 17th with the pursuing troops of Davout, which once again inflicted heavy losses and revealed serious deficiencies in his troops.

On February 18, 1809, he became the commander of the first Silesian Hussar Regiment and was promoted to colonel on June 1, 1809. At that time, he was considered by Scharnhorst's to be a highly skilled and well-recommended officer (among others by L'Estocq's), which is why he was promoted out of turn. However, an instruction he issued on March 10, 1810, “for the troops attached to the line infantry,” revealed that he was not yet fully aligned with modern military concepts, as he showed only a limited understanding of the training of skirmishers. During the reorganization of the army, he was also sent to the commission under Scharnhorst's chairmanship for drafting the cavalry exercise regulations.

=== Sixth Coalition ===
On December 12, 1809, he was entrusted with the provisional command of the Upper Silesian Cavalry Brigade and became a major general on March 30, 1813. His brigade, belonging to Blücher's Corps, played a distinguished role in the Battle of Lutzen, fighting particularly for the possession of Kleingörschen with varying success. Prince Leopold of Hesse-Homburg fell beside him, whom he had unsuccessfully tried to rescue from danger. A highly successful military feat was achieved by him during the brilliant cavalry Battle of Haynau on May 26.

Entrusted by Blücher with its command, he lured the troops of French General Maison into an ambush, inflicting significant losses on them at the right moment from his position at the mill in Baudmannsdorf by igniting it as a signal for the attack, which greatly aided the Prussian-Russian troops retreating from Bautzen to Liegnitz and particularly enhanced the prestige of the allied armies just before the conclusion of the Truce of Pläswitz, revitalizing the troops’ morale. The raid at Haynau earned Zieten the Iron Cross 1st Class.

After the armistice ended, Zieten served as chief of the 11th Brigade belonging to the 2nd Kleist Corps at the main army. In the Battle of Dresden on August 26 and 27, he fought with some success for the Große Garten after capturing Strehlen. He significantly contributed to the decision at Kulm by covering the rear of Kleist Corps, engaging in a lively skirmish with Marshal Saint-Cyr at Glashütte, and blocking the road by occupying the southern edge of the Jungfernwald behind Nollendorf amid persistent and difficult fighting due to the deteriorating road conditions.

After the battle, he stayed as an advance guard. He was actively involved in the skirmishes leading up to the Battle of Leipzig and was assigned with his brigade to the corps of Austrian General von Klenau shortly before the decisive battle, securing on October 16 (Wachau) the connection between Klenau's Corps and Wittgenstein's Corps. On the 18th, he made several unsuccessful attempts to take Stötteritz at the order of Barclay de Tolly after the successful defense of Zuckelhausen. Later, he captured the village of Probstheida, which had been set ablaze by his artillery.

In the following winter campaign on French soil, Zieten, now part of Kleist Corps of Blücher's army and since December 8, 1813, a lieutenant general, repeatedly found himself in action at crucial moments with his newly formed troops (mainly Silesians), particularly on February 14, 1814, in the Battle of Vauchamps, where, after driving Marmont back to Fromentieres the day before, he was encircled by Napoleon himself at Vauchamps and had to retreat to the main body after exceedingly brave and prudent resistance under heavy losses that nearly exhausted his brigade.

On March 9 at Laon, at the head of the cavalry of Yorck's and Kleist's Corps (30 squadrons), he executed a large-scale night flanking maneuver through marshy terrain in a brilliant manner, leading to a complete victory. Zieten's troops captured the majority of the 45 cannons and 131 supply wagons taken during the Battle of Laon. After the first Battle for Paris, he took command of the second army corps in place of Kleist's.

=== Hundred Days ===
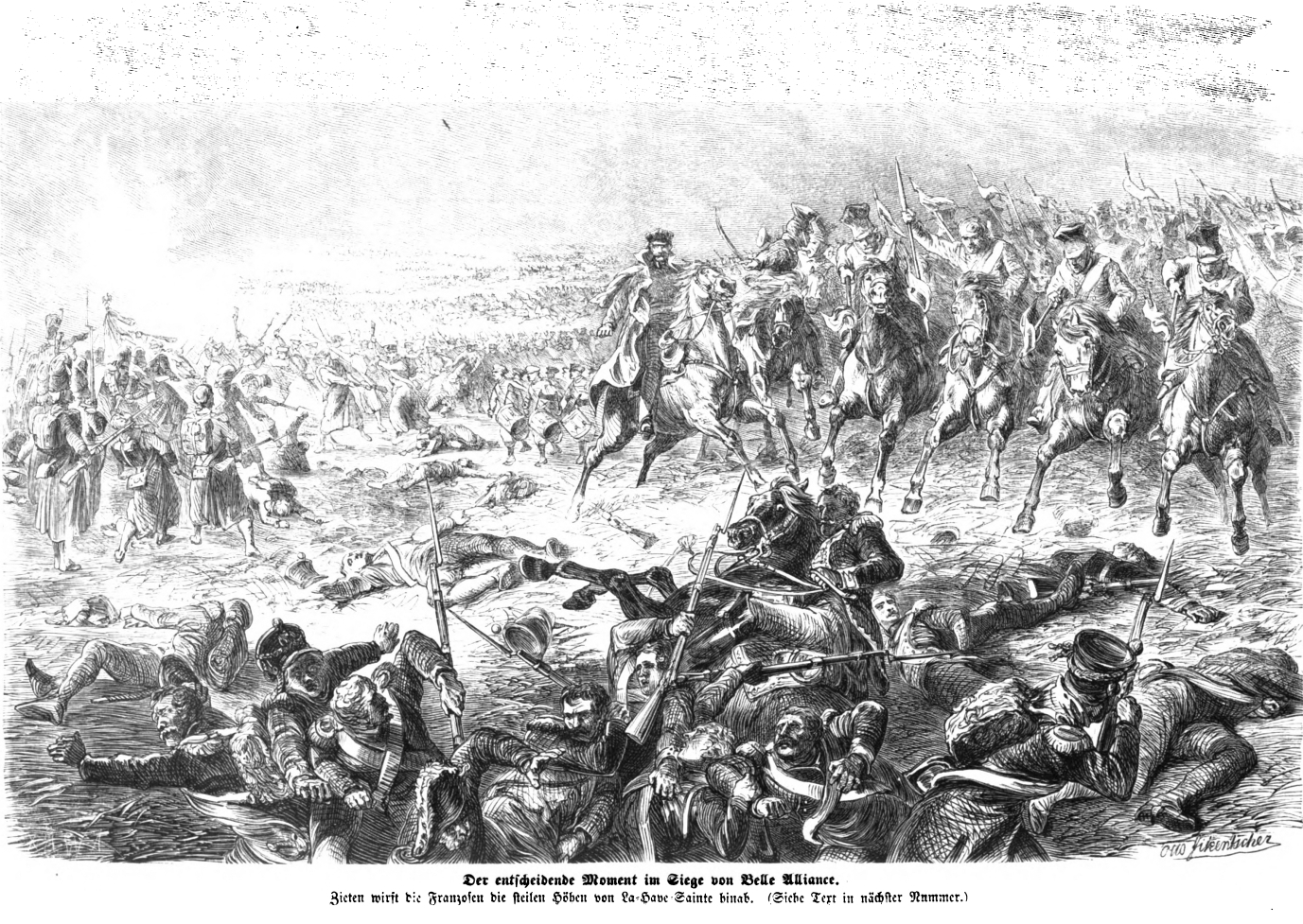
Zieten at Waterloo, caption says; "The decisive moment in the victory of Waterloo. Zieten throws the French down the steep heights of La-Haye-Sainte."

During the Waterloo Campaign of 1815, Lieutenant-General von Zieten commanded the Prussian I Corps. The corps fought a holding action against the French on 15 June, and was heavily engaged against the French the next day at the Battle of Ligny, and then again two days later on 18 June at the Battle of Waterloo.

On 1 July, Zieten's I Corps participated in the Battle of Issy just outside the walls of Paris. At the end of the campaign on 7 July, his corps was granted the honour of being the first major Coalition force to enter Paris.

== Later life ==
King Frederick William III of Prussia granted Zieten the title of Graf, or count, on 3 September 1817. At the age of 69, he was promoted to Generalfeldmarschall on 9 September 1839. Zieten died in Warmbrunn.

== Military record ==
Key to opponent flags

(First French Empire)
French Empire
(1804–1814; 1815)

Key to outcome

Indicates a favorable outcome Indicates an unfavorable outcome Indicates an uncertain outcome

| Date | Conflict | Action | Opponent | Type | Country | Rank | Outcome |
|---|---|---|---|---|---|---|---|
| 28 Nov 1793 | War of the First Coalition | Battle of Kaiserslautern | (France) | Battle | Holy Roman Empire | Lieutenant | Victory |
| 14 Oct 1806 | War of the Fourth Coalition | Battle of Auerstedt | (France) | Battle | Kingdom of Prussia | Captain | Defeat |
| 7 Feb 1807 | War of the Fourth Coalition | Battle of Eylau | (France) | Battle | Kingdom of Prussia | Lieutenant Colonel | Defeat |
| 2 May 1813 | War of the Sixth Coalition | Battle of Lutzen | (France) | Battle | Kingdom of Prussia | Major General | Defeat |
| 26 May 1813 | War of the Sixth Coalition | Battle of Haynau | (France) | Battle | Kingdom of Prussia | Major General | Victory |
| 26 Aug 1813 | War of the Sixth Coalition | Battle of Dresden | (France) | Battle | Kingdom of Saxony | Major General | Defeat |
| 29 Aug 1813 | War of the Sixth Coalition | Battle of Kulm | (France) | Battle | Kingdom of Bohemia | Major General | Victory |
| 16 Oct 1813 | War of the Sixth Coalition | Battle of Leipzig | (France) | Battle | Kingdom of Saxony | Major General | Decisive Victory |
| 14 Feb 1814 | War of the Sixth Coalition | Battle of Vauchamps | (France) | Battle | French Empire | Lieutenant General | Defeat |
| 9 Mar 1814 | War of the Sixth Coalition | Battle of Laon | (France) | Battle | French Empire | Lieutenant General | Victory |
| 16 Jun 1815 | War of the Seventh Coalition | Battle of Ligny | (France) | Battle | Kingdom of the Netherlands | Lieutenant General | Defeat |
| 18 Jun 1815 | War of the Seventh Coalition | Battle of Waterloo | (France) | Battle | Kingdom of the Netherlands | Lieutenant General | Decisive Victory |
| 2 Jul 1815 | War of the Seventh Coalition | Battle of Issy | (France) | Battle | French Empire | Lieutenant General | Victory |

== Bibliography ==
- Dr. Gerhard Bauer: Hans Ernst von Zieten, Biography in German and English, Verlag Militaria GmbH, Vienna 2020
