= Robert Torrens =

Robert Torrens may refer to:

- Robert Torrens (judge) (1775–1856), Irish judge
- Robert Torrens (economist) (1780–1864), Irish economist and Royal Marines officer, chair of the South Australian Colonisation Commission, cousin of the above
- Robert Torrens (British Army officer) (1780–1840), British Army officer who fought at the Battle of Waterloo
- Robert Torrens (Irish politician) (1810–1874), Irish Conservative politician
- Sir Robert Richard Torrens (1812–1884), Irish-born colonial administrator and politician in South Australia and the United Kingdom, founded Torrens Title, son of the economist
- Roy Torrens (Robert Torrens, 1948–2021), Irish cricketer
