= Battle of Issy =

1815 Napoleonic Wars battle

- Part of the Napoleonic Wars (Seventh Coalition 1815)
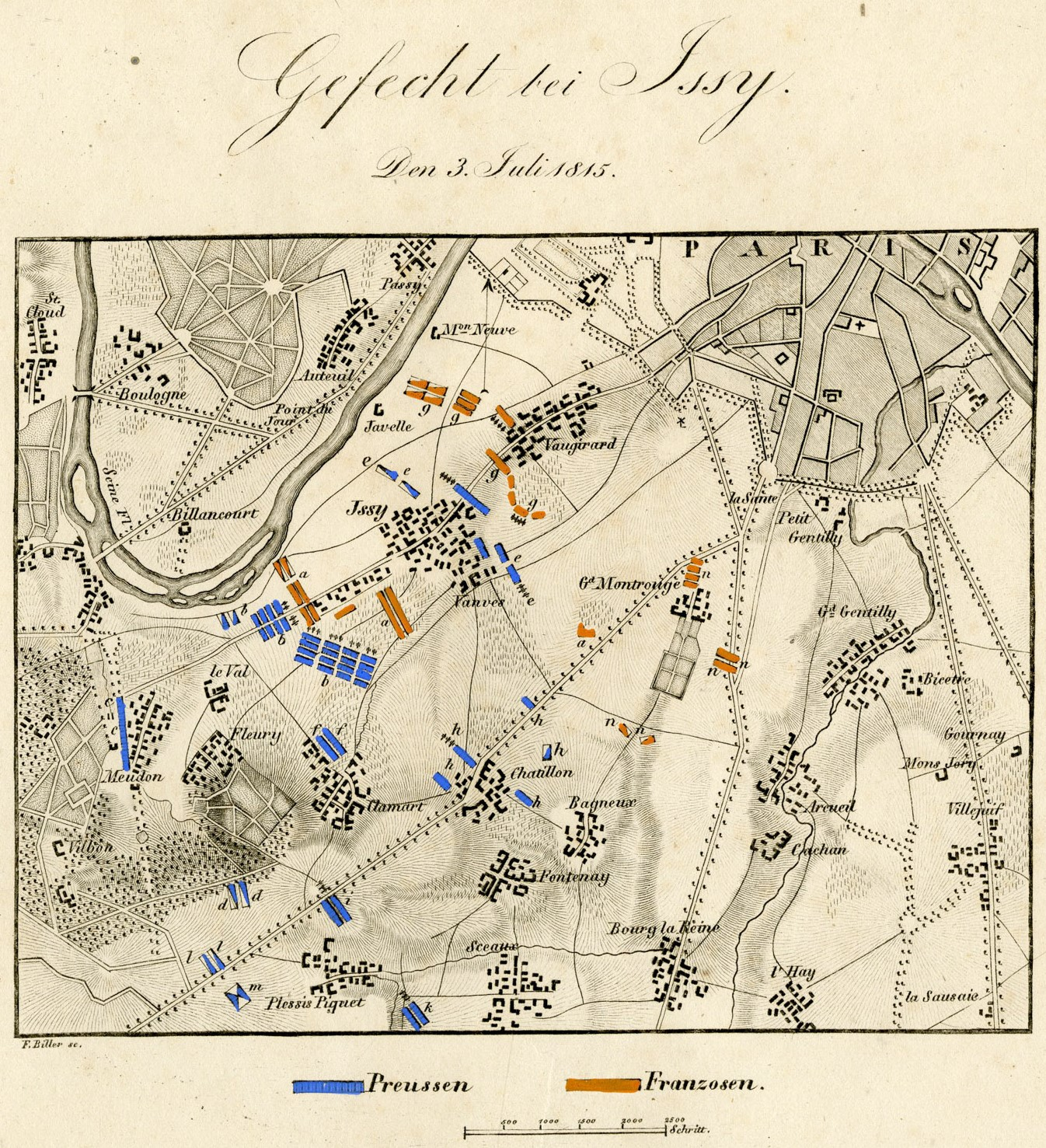
- Plan of the battle of Issy 1815 (from 1837)
Date	2–3 July 1815
Location	Issy, France 48.8239°N 2.2700°E
Result	Prussian victory

Belligerents
(Kingdom of Prussia) Prussia	(First French Empire) France

Commanders and leaders
(Kingdom of Prussia) Hans von Zieten	(First French Empire) Dominique Vandamme

Strength
30,000	13,000

Casualties and losses
Unknown	3,000+ casualties

The Battle of Issy was fought on the 2 and 3 July 1815 in and around the village of Issy, a short distance south west of Paris. The result was a victory for Prussian General von Zieten over an outnumbered French army commanded by General Dominique Vandamme. Issy was the last attempt of the French army to defend Paris from falling to the Coalition for the second time in two years.

== Prelude ==
After French defeat at the Battle of Waterloo, the armies of the Duke of Wellington, Field Marshal von Blücher, and other Seventh Coalition forces, advanced upon Paris. Wellington and von Blücher continued their operations up to the gates of Paris and, on the 30 June, had recourse to a movement which proved decisive to the fate of the city. Marshal von Blücher, having taken the village of Aubervilliers, or Vertus, made a movement to his right, and, crossing the Seine at Saint-Germain below the capital, threw his whole force upon the south side of the city where no preparations had been made to resist an enemy.

This was a thunderbolt to the French; it was then that their weakness and the Coalition's strength were seen most conspicuously, because at that moment the armies of Wellington and von Blücher were separated and the whole French army was between them, yet the French could not move to prevent their junction.

After the war Lazare Carnot (Napoleon's Minister of Internal Affairs) blamed Napoleon for not fortifying Paris on the south side, and claimed he had forewarned Napoleon of this danger. The French were thus obliged to abandon all the works they had constructed for the defence of the capital, and moved their army across the Seine to meet the Prussians.

Although a Prussian brigade was defeated in a skirmish at Rocquencourt near Versailles, the movement of the Prussians to the right was not checked. On the morning of the 2 July, the Prussian I Corps under the command of General Graf von Zieten had its right wing positioned at Plessis-Piquet, its left at Meudon, with its reserves at Versailles.

== Attack ==
Zieten advanced on the 2 July towards the heights of Meudon and Châtillon and fought a sharp battle for the possession of Sèvres, Moulineaux, and Issy. The contest was obstinate, but the Prussians finally surmounted all difficulties and succeeded in establishing themselves firmly upon the heights of Meudon and in the village of Issy. The French losses during this engagement are estimated at 3,000 men.

== Counterattack ==
At a French Council of War, which was held during the night of 2/3 July in Paris, it was decided that the defence of the capital was not practicable against the two Coalition armies. Nevertheless, the French Commander-in-Chief Marshal Davout was desirous of another attempt before he would finally agree to a suspension of hostilities.

At three o'clock on the morning of the 3 July Vandamme, commander of the French III Corps, advanced in two columns from Vaugirard to attack Issy. Between Vaugirard and the river Seine he had a considerable force of cavalry, the front of which was flanked by a battery advantageously posted near Auteuil on the right bank of the river. The action commenced with a brisk cannonade, the French having brought twenty pieces of cannon against the front of the village which was then vigorously assailed by his infantry. The Prussians had constructed some barricades and other defences during the night; but these did not protect them from the sharp fire of case shot which was poured upon them by the French batteries, the guns of which enfiladed the streets. The 12th and 24th Prussian Regiments, and the 2nd Westphalian Landwehr, supported by a half battery of twelve pounders, fought with great bravery against the French. There were many losses on both sides. At length the French withdrew, but only to advance again, considerably reinforced.

The 2nd Prussian Brigade was immediately ordered to join the 1st, and the whole of the troops of the I Prussian Corps stood to arms. Zieten sent a request to Blücher for the support of two brigades of Bülow's IV Prussian Corps and, at the same time, begged Thielemann to advance (in conformity with instructions conveyed to him from headquarters) from Châtillon and to threaten the French left flank.

In the meantime the French renewed their attack upon Issy, which, however, again proved unsuccessful. This was followed by a heavy cannonade and by further assaults, without any decided advantage having been gained over the defenders. The French did not appear disposed to venture upon a more general attack, which would have offered them a much greater chance of forcing back the Prussian advanced guard; the French commanders probably considered that such an attack, if unsuccessful, might end with the suburbs of Paris being easily carried by storm. Accordingly, after four hours' continued but fruitless attempts upon Zieten's advanced position, the French fell back upon Paris, with the Prussian skirmishers following them until they came within a very short distance of the barriers surrounding the city.

== Aftermath ==
Issy was the final attempt of the French army to defend Paris and, with this defeat, all hope of holding Paris faded. The French high command decided that they would capitulate.

Accordingly, at seven o'clock in the morning, the French ceased fire and Brigadier General Revest (chief of staff to the French III Corps) was delegated to approach Zieten's Corps, which was the nearest to the capital of all the Coalition forces, to offer a capitulation and to request an immediate armistice.

On hearing of the unilateral French ceasefire, Blücher demanded that the French provide delegates with full powers of negotiation before he would finally agree to a suspension of hostilities, and indicated the Palace of St. Cloud as the place where the negotiations should be carried on. He then moved his headquarters to the palace.

Officers furnished with full powers by their respective chiefs soon met at St. Cloud, where the Duke of Wellington had joined Prince Blücher. The result of their deliberations was the surrender of Paris under the terms of the Convention of St. Cloud.

Napoleon Bonaparte had already announced his abdication (24 June 1815). Napoleon had been on the run, unable to remain in France or to escape from it, a few days later, on 15 July, he surrendered himself to Captain Maitland of HMS Bellerophon and was transported to England. The full restoration of Louis XVIII followed the emperor's departure. After the hundred days war ended, Napoleon Bonaparte was imprisoned on the island of Saint Helena, where he died in May 1821.

== See also ==
- List of Napoleonic battles

== Notes ==
Preceded by Battle of Rocquencourt	Napoleonic Wars; Battle of Issy	Succeeded by Convention of Saint-Cloud
