= Attwood Torrens =

English cricketer and army officer

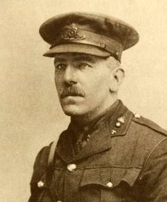

Personal information
- Full name: Attwood Alfred Torrens
- Born: 13 February 1874; Hayes, Kent, England
- Died: 8 December 1916 (aged 42); Pozières, Somme, France
- Batting: Right-handed
- Bowling: Right-arm medium-pace
- Relatives: Alfred Torrens (father); William Torrens (brother)

Career statistics
Competition	First-class
Matches	9
Runs scored	183
Batting average	14.07
100s/50s	0/1
Top score	87
Balls bowled	752
Wickets	11
Bowling average	30.45
5 wickets in innings	0
10 wickets in match	0
Best bowling	3/41
Catches/stumpings	2/0
- Source: CricketArchive, 23 October 2017

Major Attwood Alfred Torrens (13 February 1874 – 8 December 1916) was an English cricketer and army officer.

Attwood Torrens was educated at Harrow School before going to work at the stock exchange. He had played only school and club cricket when he was selected to tour New Zealand in 1906-07 with an MCC team of amateur cricketers.

A lower-order batsman and medium-paced bowler, he made his first-class debut in the tour match against Wellington on Christmas Day 1906. His form was modest until late in the tour, when in the two-day match against a Wairarapa XV he took 11 wickets. In the next first-class match, against Hawke's Bay, he made the top score of the match with 87 and took 3 for 44 and 2 for 28. He was selected to play in the two matches against New Zealand that followed immediately, but was not successful.

After the tour Torrens continued to play club cricket in England, including two first-class matches for MCC and one for the Free Foresters. He never played county cricket.

Torrens was commissioned in the Royal Artillery in 1915 and left for the front in May 1916. By December 1916 he was Major commanding D Battery of 307th Brigade, Royal Field Artillery. He was killed by a shell fragment at Pozières on 8 December 1916 while running across open ground in an attempt to move his men to safety. He is buried in the Pozières British Cemetery.
