= Robert Torrens (British Army officer) =

British Army officer

Lieutenant-Colonel Robert Henry Thomas Torrens CB (1780 – May 1840) was a British Army officer. He served with distinction at the Battle of Waterloo receiving the Companion of the Order of the Bath and the Second Class of the Order of St Anne for valor and distinguished service. Robert Torrens was Commissioner on behalf of the British Army at the Convention of Saint-Cloud (July 1815). He wrote a detailed account of the Waterloo campaign in a letter to his uncle.

Robert Torrens served under the Duke of Wellington in the Second Anglo-Maratha War, the Peninsular War and the Waterloo campaign. In later life he served in the Queen's Foot in Madras and was Adjutant-General in the East Indies. He died at the age of 59.
