= William Torrens =

English cricketer

Personal information
- Full name: William Matt Torrens
- Born: 19 October 1869; Sundridge Park, Kent
- Died: 18 February 1931 (aged 61); Westminster, London
- Batting: Right-handed
- Role: Wicket-keeper
- Relatives: Alfred Torrens (father); Attwood Torrens (brother)

Domestic team information
- Years: Team
- 1890: Kent

Career statistics
Competition	First-class
Matches	4
Runs scored	86
Batting average	14.33
100s/50s	0/0
Top score	43
Catches/stumpings	2/–
- Source: Cricinfo, 12 January 2012

William Matt Torrens (19 October 1869 – 18 February 1931) was an English cricketer. Torrens was a right-handed batsman who fielded as a wicket-keeper. He was born at Sundridge Park, Kent, and educated at Harrow School.

Torrens made his first-class debut for Kent against Gloucestershire in 1890. He made three further first-class appearances for Kent in that season, the last of which came against the touring Australians. In his four first-class matches, he scored a total of 86 runs at an average of 14.33, with a high score of 43.

He died at Westminster, London on 18 February 1931. His father, Alfred, and brother, Attwood both played first-class cricket.

== Bibliography ==
- Carlaw, Derek (2020). Kent County Cricketers, A to Z: Part One (1806–1914) (PDF). Cardiff: ACS.
