= Battle of Haynau =

1813 battle during the War of the Sixth Coalition

- Part of the German campaign of the Sixth Coalition
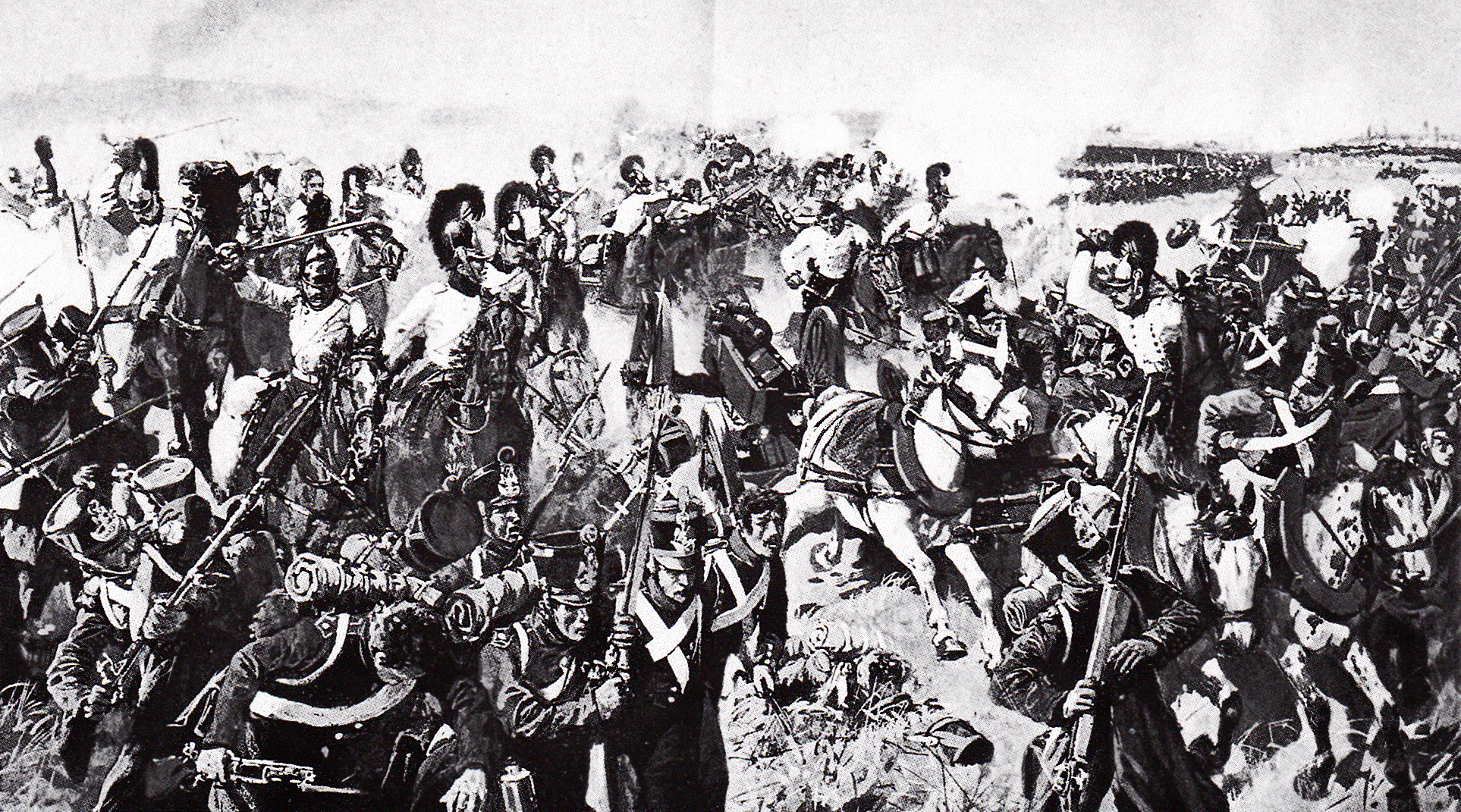
- Prussian cavalry attacking French infantry under the command of General Maison.
Date	26 May 1813
Location	Haynau, Lower Silesia 51°16′N 15°56′E
Result	Prussian victory

Belligerents
(First French Empire) France	(Kingdom of Prussia) Prussia

Commanders and leaders
(First French Empire) Nicolas Joseph Maison	(Kingdom of Prussia) Gebhard Leberecht von Blücher

Strength
5,000	15,400

Casualties and losses
1,400	250
- Location within Europe

War of the Sixth Coalition:
German campaign
current battle
Napoleon in command
Napoleon not in command

The Battle of Haynau was fought on 26 May 1813, between Prussian cavalry under the command of General Gebhard Leberecht von Blücher and a French infantry division under the command of General Nicolas Joseph Maison. The battle resulted in a Prussian victory.

== Prelude ==
After their defeat at the Battle of Bautzen (20–21 May), the allies broke off the action at their own time and retired in such good order that Napoleon failed to capture a single trophy as proof of his victory. The enemy's escape annoyed him greatly, the absence of captured guns and prisoners reminded him too much of his Russian experiences, and he redoubled his demands on his corps commanders for greater vigour in the pursuit.

== Battle ==
Napoleon's entreaties led his corps commanders to push on without due regard to tactical precautions, and Blücher took advantage of their carelessness. On 26 May, with some twenty squadrons of Landwehr cavalry, he surprised, rode over and almost destroyed Maison's division. The material loss inflicted on the French was not very great, but its effect in raising the morale of the raw Prussian cavalry and increasing their confidence in their old commander was, enormous. On the other hand, they had to suffer the loss of the commanding cavalry officer Florens von Bockum-Dolffs, who had led the charge himself.

== Monument ==
As on other battlegrounds, a small monument was erected there commemorating the Prussian victory. It was destroyed by Polish forces in 1945.
