= Convention of Saint-Cloud =

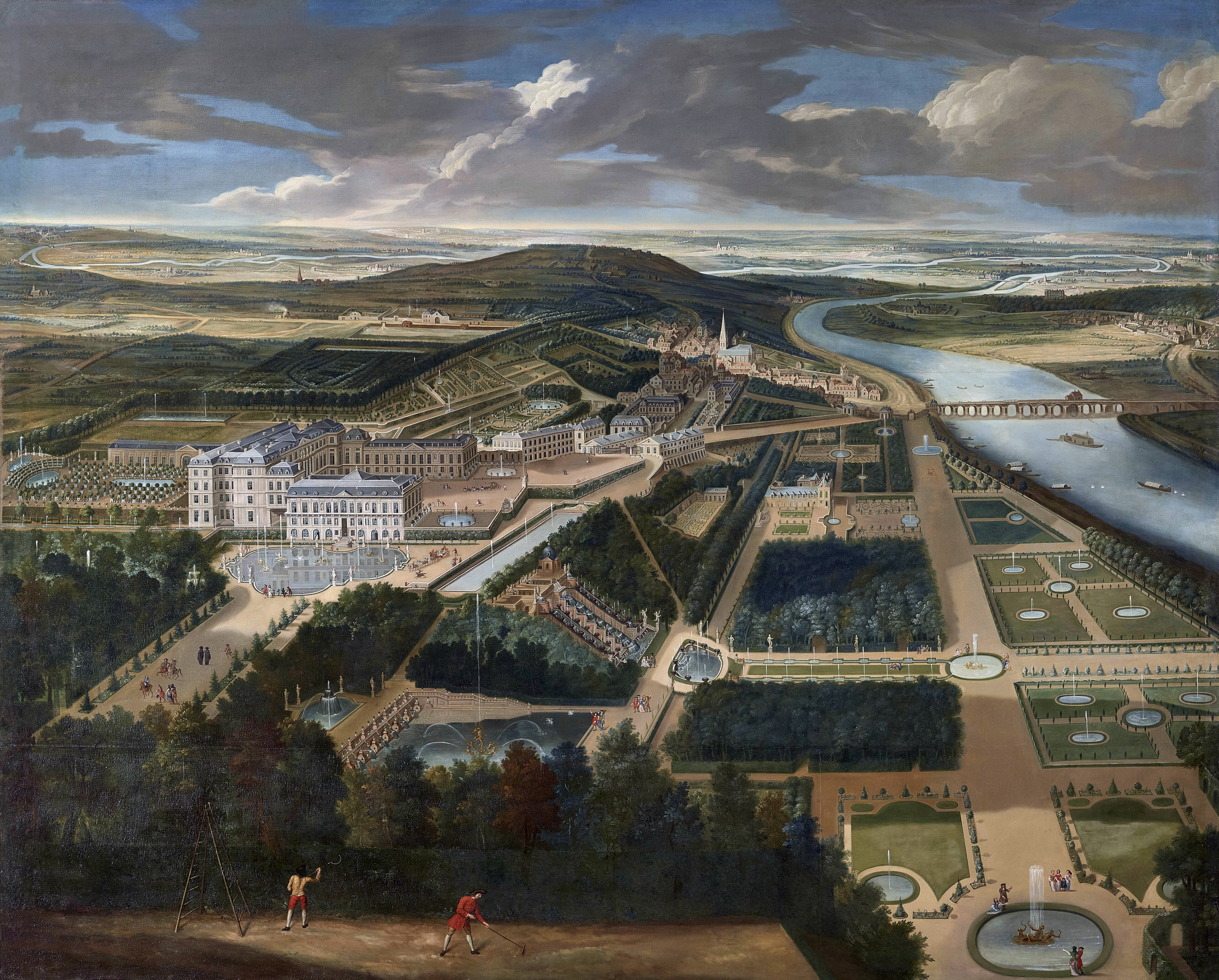
Saint-Cloud, general view, painting by Allegrain

The Convention of Saint-Cloud was a military convention signed on 3 July 1815 by which the French army under Marshal Davout surrendered Paris to the armies of Prince Blücher and the Duke of Wellington, ending the hostilities of the Hundred Days. The agreement was signed at Saint-Cloud, a suburb of Paris.

Under the terms of the convention, the commander of the French army, "Marshal Prince of Eckmühl" (better known as Marshal Davout) surrendered Paris to the two allied armies of the Seventh Coalition and agreed to move the French army well away from Paris, to south of the Loire. In return, the allies promised to respect the rights and property of the local government, French civilians and members of the French armed forces.

The French delegates who signed the treaty were:

- Louis Bignon, who held the portfolio of foreign affairs,
- General Guillemot, chief of the general staff of the army,
- Comte de Bondy, prefect of the department of the Seine

Coalition officers who signed the treaty were:

- Karl Müffling, the Prussian commissioner to Wellington's army
- Colonel Hervey-Bathurst

The convention was approved by Davout for the French, and by Blücher and Wellington for the Seventh Coalition.
