= Bogislav Friedrich Emanuel von Tauentzien =

Prussian general (1760–1824)

Graf Bogislav Friedrich Emanuel von Tauentzien
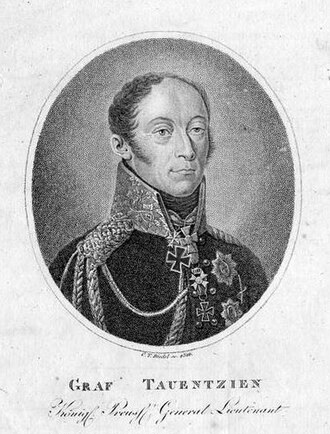
- Tauentzien in 1816
- Born: September 15, 1760; Potsdam
- Died: February 20, 1824 (aged 63)
- Military career
- Allegiance: Prussian
- Branch: Army
- Rank: General
- Commands: VI. Armeekorps
- Conflicts: Napoleonic Wars
- Awards: Grand Cross of the Iron Cross

Bogislav Friedrich Emanuel Graf Tauentzien von Wittenberg (15 September 1760 – 20 February 1824) was a Prussian general of the Napoleonic Wars.

== Biography ==
Tauentzien was born in Potsdam in the Margraviate of Brandenburg as the son of Friedrich Bogislav von Tauentzien. He married Elisabeth von Amstedt, with whom he had one son and one daughter. The branch of the von Tauentzien family with the title of count ended with the 1854 death of Tauentzien's son, Heinrich Bogislav.

Tauentzien entered the Prussian Army in 1775 and was granted the title of Graf (count) on 5 August 1791. He became a royal aide-de-camp in 1793; he was entrusted with many diplomatic missions until 1813. Tauentzien participated in the campaign of 1793 and was successively promoted to Oberst in 1795 and Generalmajor in 1801. He commanded an observation corps of Friedrich Ludwig zu Hohenlohe-Ingelfingen until the Saalburg in 1806. Shortly before the Battle of Saalfeld, a French corps under Marshal Bernadotte defeated Tauentzien's detachment of 9,000 men at Schleiz. Tauentzien capably organized the retreat to Mittel-Pöllnitz so his troops could rejoin the main Prussian army.

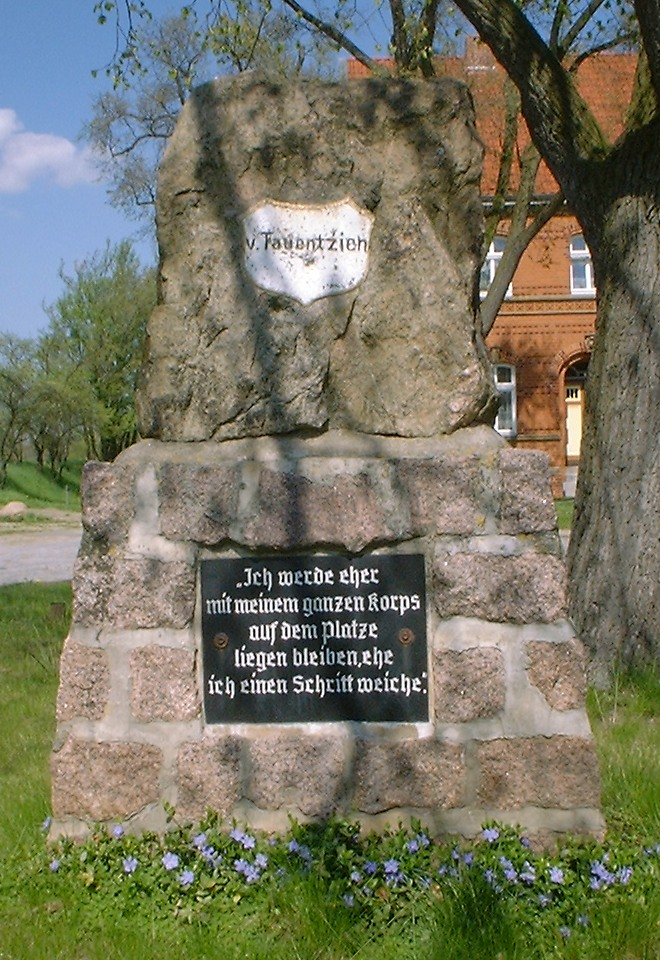
Memorial of Tauentzien in Dennewitz.

At Jena, Tauentzien led the vanguard of the Hohenlohe Corps. Scores of Prussian generals were dismissed after the defeat of Prussia in 1806–07, although Tauentzien was not. As Generalleutnant, he commanded the Brandenburg Brigade after the Treaties of Tilsit and participated in the reorganization of the defeated Prussian army.

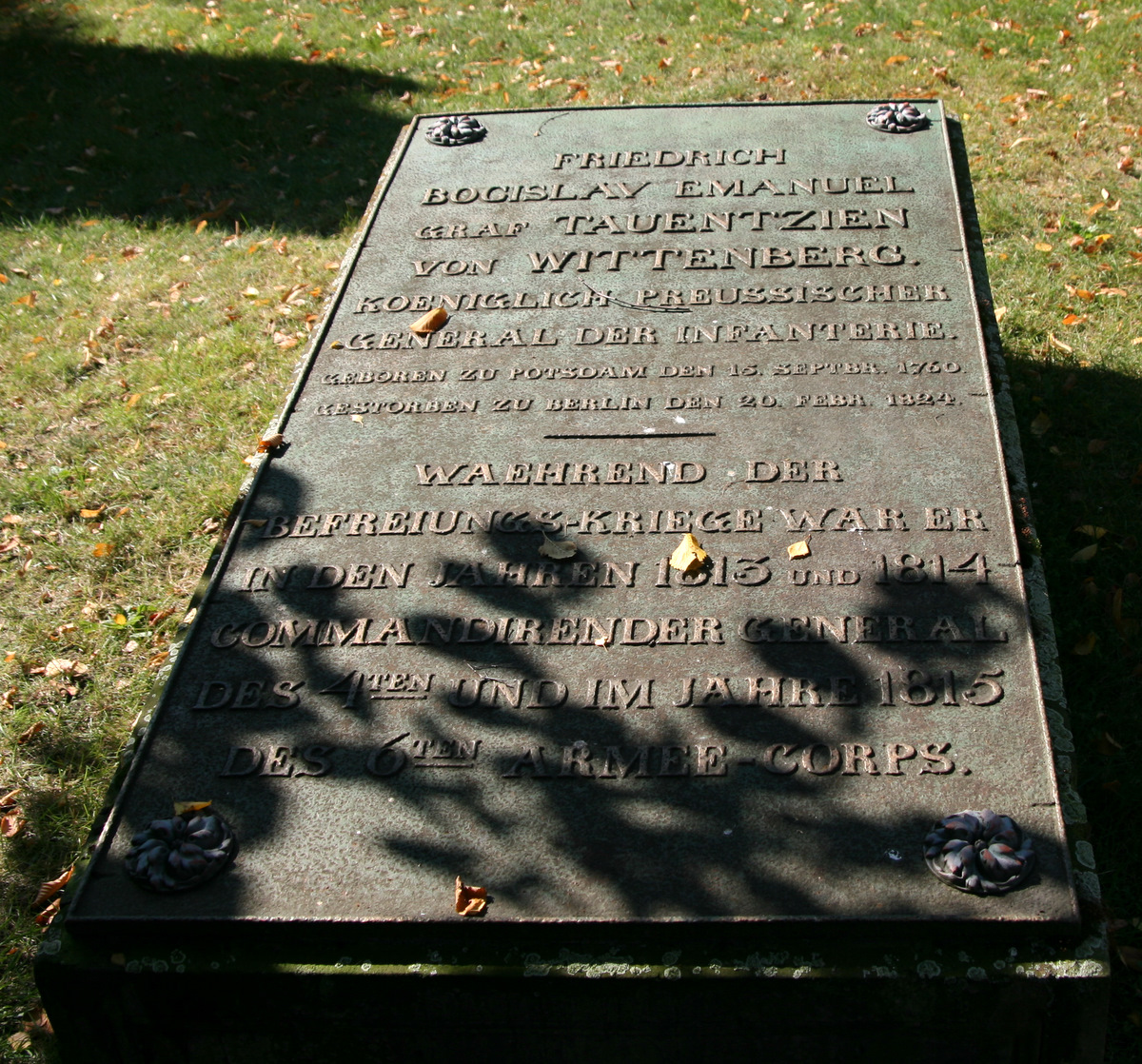
Tauentzien's tomb in Berlin

In 1813, Tauentzien was named Military Governor between the Oder and the Vistula Rivers, and he succeeded in the siege of Stettin. As General der Infanterie, he commanded the IV. Armeekorps, which consisted mostly of Landwehr, and participated in the battles of Großbeeren on 23 August and Dennewitz on 6 September. In October his troops left the relative safety of Dessau and crossed the Elbe.

After the Battle of Leipzig, Tauentzien accepted the capitulation of Torgau on 26 December 1813. Generalleutnant Leopold Wilhelm von Dobschütz led the capture of Wittenberg on the night of 13–14 January 1814, but acclaim for the victory went to his superior, Tauentzien, who was granted the honorary title "von Wittenberg", a coat of arms, and, on 26 January, the Grand Cross of the Iron Cross. A street in Wittenberg was named Tauentzienstraße, but is now known as Dobschützstraße. On 24 May, Tauentzien recovered Magdeburg.

Tauentzien commanded the VI. Armeekorps during the Hundred Days of Napoleon Bonaparte. The Battle of Waterloo had already occurred by the time his troops reached France. After the end of the war, he commanded the III. Armeekorps.

Tauentzien died as Commander of Berlin. Tauentzienstraße in Berlin is named in his honor.
