= Leopold Wilhelm von Dobschütz =

Prussian military governor

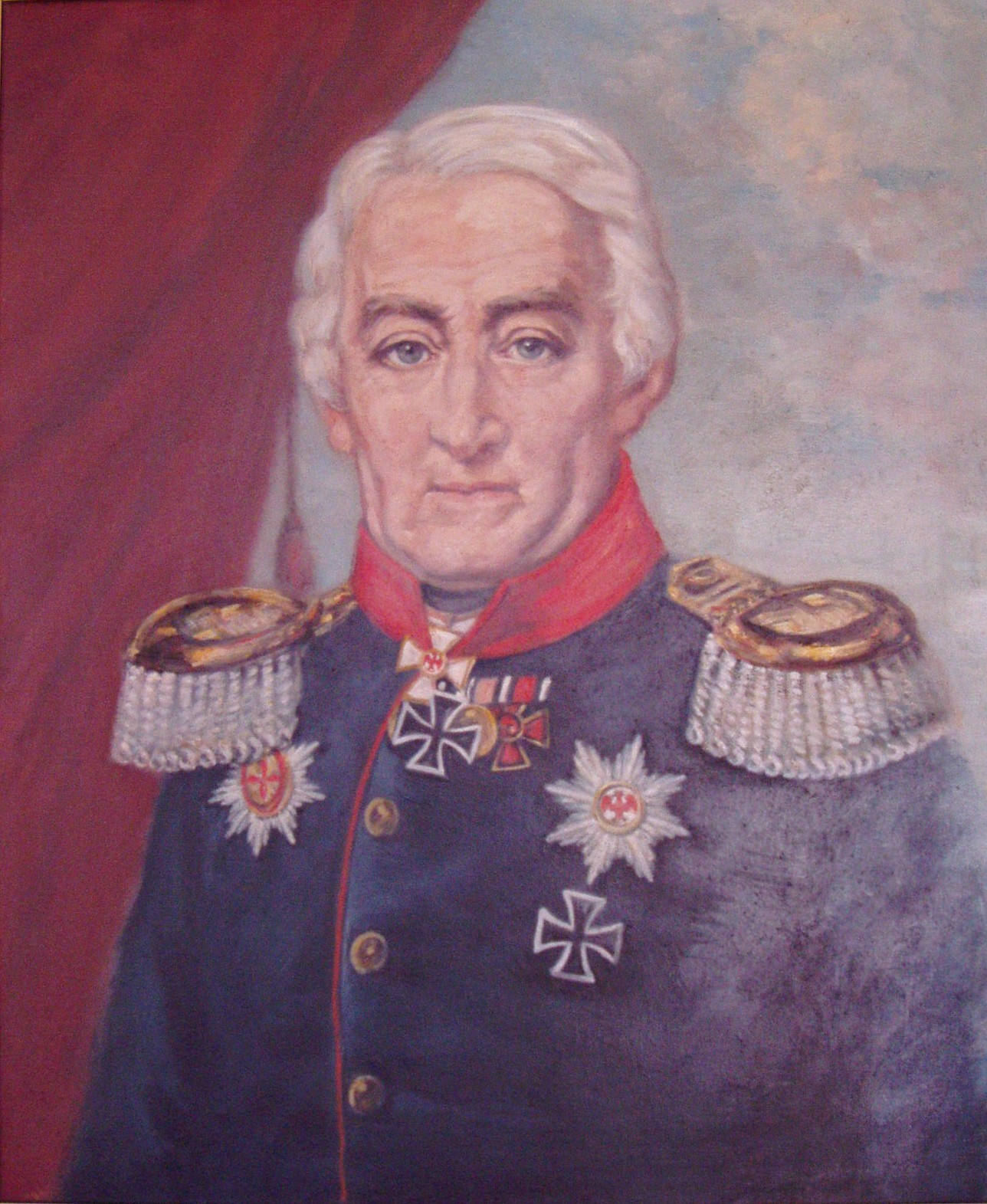
Leopold Wilhelm von Dobschütz

Leopold Wilhelm von Dobschütz (1 January 1763 in Brieg, Niederschlesien – 3 February 1836 at Gut Zölling, Kreis Freystadt, prev. Kreis Sagan, Niederschlesien) was a Prussian "general of cavalry", the "hero of Dennewitz" and "liberator of Wittenberg", military governor of the Rhine province and of Breslau. He was Gutsherr of Zölling, which his wife had inherited, and the Gütern Ober- and Nieder-Briesnitz as well as Schönbrunn, all in the district Sagan.

As to the year of his birth, there are different statements: The year 1763 is belied by his gravestone inscription and the "Seniority List of the royal Prussian army for the year 1801"; in his marriage certificate of 1787, his age is indicated as 28 years, according to which he would have been born in 1759. In other sources, one finds the years 1761 and 1764, though 1763 is more likely to be correct.

== Family ==
Though nothing certain is known as to his parents, his mother was an only daughter from the old Silesian noble family of Dobschütz. His father is thought to have been a civil servant in Brzeg. Since almost every detail of his military career is known yet there is not a single reference to his parents or birthplace in the official documents, he may have been illegitimate or descended from an illegitimate branch of the family.

On 27 November 1787, as a 22-year-old second lieutenant, he married the 17-year-old Henriette von Braun (1770, probably at Gut Zölling - 5 April 1854, Glogau, Lower Silesia) at Gut Zölling. She was the eldest daughter of Hans Carl Christoph von Braun and Maria Sophia von Lehwald. The marriage remained childless, though they adopted Friedrich Heinrich Konrad Viktor von Lützow (1818–1831), a nephew of Henriette.

== Military career ==
=== Training ===
After attending Gymnasium in Brieg (before 1776), Dobschütz had begun his military career at 14 by entering the 11th Dragoon Regiment as a junker (v. Mitzladd, v. Bosse, v. Voss), rising to ensign on 26 December 1778 and serving in the garrison at Sagan the War of the Bavarian Succession in 1778–79. On 24 August 1785 he rose to second lieutenant in his dragoon regiment.

In July 1786 Peter von Biron, Duke of Courland, joined the garrison, as did the Duke of Sagan in 1786. The July issue of the "Schlesischen Provinzialblätter" included the following: "around 6 o'clock at the Schultheater im Schloß of the officers were drilled. Herr Lieutenant von Dobschütz directed the whole and played the main role with old Beyfall. His Highness honoured him with a gold medal, costing 12 ducats." In 1787 Dobschütz married.

=== First Coalition ===
On 30 May 1791 he became first lieutenant and on 13 May 1791 was appointed staff-captain (captain). Then, between 1793 and 1795, he joined the War of the First Coalition against the French (participating in the battles at Pirmasens, Kaiserslautern and Trippstadt). During this time he remained in the 11th Dragoon Regiment and on 20 November 1794 he rose to the rank of major.

=== Grünberg ===
In 1795 he served in the garrison at Grünberg, where in 1798 his commander major-general von Voss remarked he was "a good staff officer, who was not lacking in military skills, and endeavours to gain more, brave before the enemy, who recommended himself". On 14 March 1799 he was appointed head of the 4th Squadron, in which post he twice weekly distributed Rumford's Soup to children and the poor. The "Schlesischen Provinzialblätter " wrote on 18 February 1804 "Herr Major von Dobschütz ...always worthy of the most notable awards, has become the first free-willing member of this institution. He also let this soup be prepared at his own expense." Already on 24 July 1798 he qualified for a rise to the canonicate at St Nikolai zu Magdeburg, awarded him by Frederick William III of Prussia.

=== Third and Fourth Coalitions ===
On 15 June 1805 he was promoted to lieutenant colonel and on 15 June 1806 to oberst. Also in 1806 he took part in the Silesian campaign, in which he was captured by the French. On 13 March 1807 he had already been listed by the king for "replacement" (i.e. release from active service), but after the Peace of Tilsit (9 July 1807) he was still part of a prisoner exchange. In a letter dated 20 December 1808 Dobschütz asked the king that he be reinstated in the army, but on 24 February 1809 this request was finally rejected.

Reluctantly withdrawing into civilian life, Dobschütz gathered round him a circle of like-minded Patriots. In January 1810 Dobschütz again asked the king to re-enlist him, but received a letter again rejecting the request on 28 February. The letter did, however, promise to make him an officer on half pay. On 1 November 1812 he was the temporary head of the Amt of the Landrat for Landkreis Sagan, his birthplace, all the while making repeated rejected requests to re-enlist.

=== Sixth Coalition ===
At the beginning of the War of the Sixth Coalition, on the very day of the Prussian declaration of war against France (16 March 1813) he made another request to join up. He was accepted on 1 April and from May, again as an Oberst, he was president of the organising-committee for the establishment of the Silesian Landwehren.

On 6 May 1813 he was made Divisions-Chef of the 2nd Division of the Silesian Landwehr of Landkreises of Glogau, Sagan, Sprottau, Schwiebus and Grünberg. On 23 May he received the command of Crossen (in whose organisation he had been instrumental), and started on 24 May began with the Marsch. On 27 May he claimed a transition at Crossen - one for the Silesian Army and the important Berlin posts - against the French superiority under marshal Claude Victor-Perrin. Dobschütz deceived his opponent into thinking he had a military force that did not in fact exist - of 4.5 battalions and 5 squadrons the infantry was defective and the cavalry and artillery lacked munitions.

On 4 August 1813 Dobschütz was promoted to major-general in command of IV Army Corps ("von Tauentzien"), a reserve corps. In this role he took part in several coalition victories such as those in Brandenburg at Großbeeren, Zahna (4 September 1813), Jüterbog and Dennewitz (6 September 1813), and most especially at Großenhain (Sachsen) and Dessau (Sachsen-Anhalt), becoming known as the "hero of Dennewitz". Thus, for example, at Mühlberg on the Elbe (Brandenburg) on 19 September 1813 he beat 3 French chasseur regiments and captured their commander Edmond de Talleyrand-Périgord, with only 1 squadron of black hussars and 2 squadrons of the Pommeranian Landwehr and colonel Slowaisky's two "Pulks" (i.e. regiments) of Cossacks.

After a short command at Berlin, on 22 October 1813 he began the siege of Wittenberg, held by the French under general Jean François Cornu de Lapoype. On the night of 12/13 January 1814, at 2am, he finally took its fortress, despite having requested the king to be relieved of this command on 20 November the previous year. An important source for the siege is the Diary of the siege artillery for the evening of 28 December 1813 to the morning of 13 January 1814, written by the "Plauzen, Obrist and commanding engineer-officers of the 4th Army Corps, tasked with managing the siege of Wittenberg" written on 14 November 1814. It contains the following account:

Night of 28/29 December To his excellency general Graf v. Tauentzien (supreme commander) and Major-General von Dobschütz (commander of the blockade and siege of Wittenberg), Obrist v. Plauzen (commanding engineer-officer), in agreement with Hauptmann v. Bardeleben (commanding-officer, artillery), presented their plan of attack.

An unknown source quoted Dobschütz's words to his soldiers before the storming:

It will be a hot night, comrades. But I know that the storming will not fail, because you are Prussians.... Everything belonging to the [French] enemy is your property. But what the French will do is nothing and it pulls down [not] into the cold altogether. Whoever deprives citizens or abuses women and children is a robber and not a soldier, and I will treat him as such. If there is any such wrongdoer among yourselves, stamp him down, he is a disgrace to you.

After the capture of Wittenberg he was commander of the corps blockading the citadel of Erfurt and, after the corps took it on 16 May 1814, commandant of Erfurt. On 19 October 1814 Dobschütz was made military commandant of the Prussian occupying forces in Dresden in the Kingdom of Saxony, and in this post he set up a smoking ban in the city.

== Memberships, honours and decorations ==
=== Memberships ===
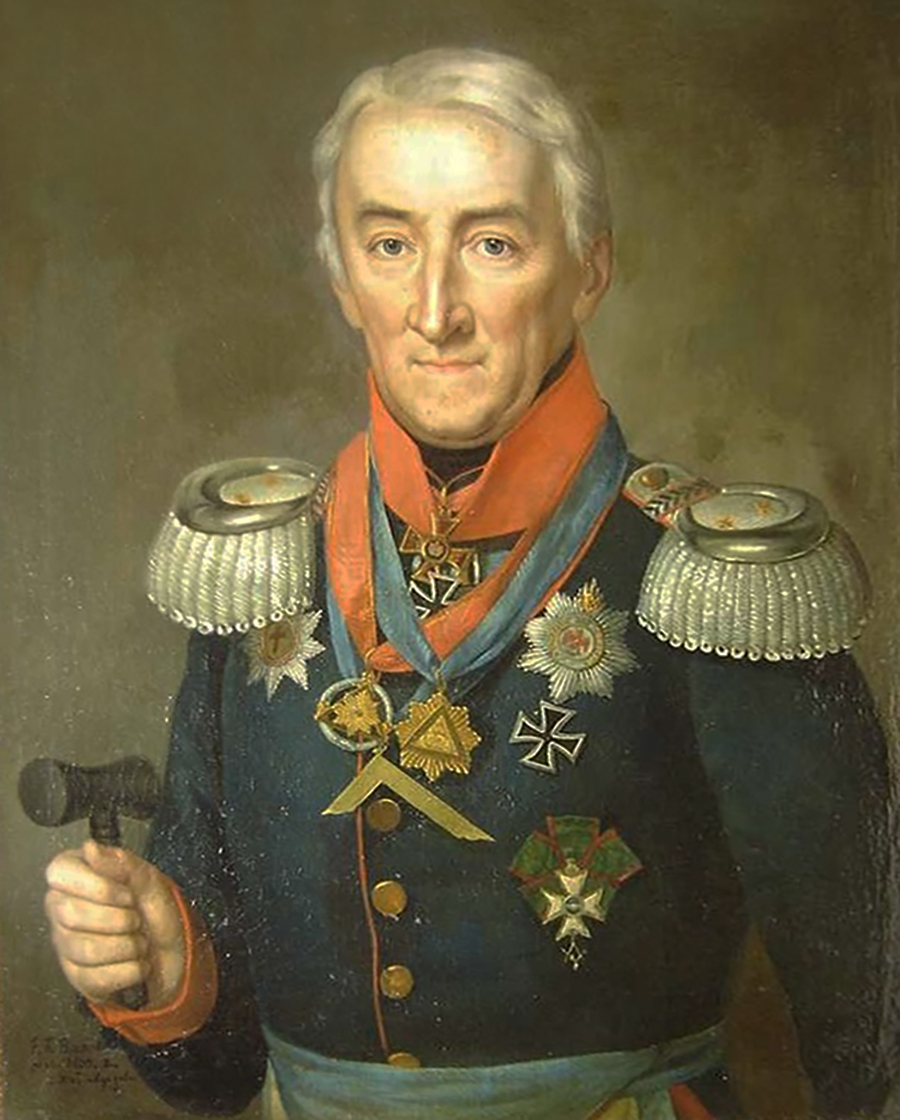
Leopold Wilhelm Dobschütz; oil painting by Georg Friedrich Raschke

- Brother of the St. Johannisloge Masonic lodge Zur Eintracht im Orient of Berlin (from 1817). Georg Friedrich Raschke (1772–1849) in 1837 painted an oil portrait of him as a Freemason.
- Brother of the Freimaurer-St. Johannisloge Zur biederen Vereinigung im Orient of Groß-Glogau (from 1817)
- Brother (4th Degree) of the Freimaurer-Schottenloge Zur Vervollkommnung im Orient of Glogau (from 1817)
- Member of the Military Society of Berlin (1802–1805)

=== Honours ===
- Honorary doctorate at the philosophical faculty (entry in the dean's book for the faculty on 30 April 1814) and masters in the liberal arts at the University of Wittenberg
- Honorary doctorate in philosophy or possibly all four faculties at the University of Erfurt (22 May 1814 entry in the "Matricula Baccalariorum et Magistrorum") (Blatt 156 b, Stadtarchiv Erfurt)
- A bastion in the old fortifications of Wittenberg was known as the "Dobschütz-Bastion" from 1864 (the 50th anniversary of the storming) until their reconstruction.
- On 13 January 1934 (the 120th anniversary of the storming) part of the Große Rothemarkstraße was renamed the Dobschützstraße, with the theology professor Ernst von Dobschütz representing the family. The name survives to this day, though "Eppeton" (pseudonym) criticised it during the German Democratic Republic:

The times change, the street name is changed! It is a fact that street-naming in Wittenberg is often a severe headache for its leaders, as you can imagine. In Wittenberg, there is still a Dobschützstraße. Who was Dobschütz? Had he contributed to the welfare of the city so much to have deserved this, a reminder that a street named after him must survive? If one looks into the history of the city one sees much evidence to the contrary. Dobschütz was a Prussian Major General who, after the peoples' battle at Leipzig, besieged Wittenberg. The fierce bombardment caused numerous fatalities among the population. On the night of 12 to 13 January 1814 the Prussians stormed the fort after a previous bombardment. This last bombardment had destroyed a total of 285 homes. For that bombardment, ordered by Major General Dobschütz, was nothing more than a hardship and misery brought on the population. From a merit at Lutherstadt there can therefore be no question. Names are sound and smoke, they say. But names are also connected with memories. And remembering Maj Dobschütz of Wittenberg is not expected to be to his credit. Therefore after one thought will ensure the discovery of a different personality in place of Major General v. Dobschütz, who has earned a street name here to stay."

- The first iron plaque by the road in the Rahmen der Straßentaufe is now lost - it read "To recapitulate / to the liberators of our city / from French domination / Major General / Leopold Wilhelm v. Dobschütz / and to the Prussian soldiers / who fell in the siege and / storming of the fortress. / The rewarding Lutherstadt Wittenberg / 13 January 1814 - 13 January 1934". This was replaced by an enamel plaque during the DDR (with the wrong date of 14 January), replaced itself by a new one after reunification.

=== Orders and decorations ===
- Iron Cross 2nd Class (1813, with blank field)
- Russian Order of St. Vladimir 3rd Class (1813 with blank field)
- Commander-cross of the Swedish Order of the Sword (1813 for Zahna)
- Iron Cross 1st Class (1813 for Dennewitz)
- Russian Order of Saint Anna 1st class (1813 for Mühlberg)
- Order of the Red Eagle 3rd Class
- Order of the Red Eagle 2nd class with oak leaves (1815 for command of the Rhine Provinces)
- Order of the Red Eagle 1st class with oak leaves (by a cabinet order of 16 January 1824)
- Service Cross (1825)

== Bibliography ==
- Sigismund von Dobschütz: General Leopold Wilhelm von Dobschütz - Wittenbergs Befreier aus Franzosennot, in: Ostdeutsche Familienkunde OFK, Heft 3/1992, Seite 81f., Verlag Degener & Co, Neustadt (Aisch), ISSN 0472-190X. (in German)
- Kadettenpfarrer Jäkel: Tagebuchblätter eines Feldgeistlichen des Dr. K. A. Köhler, Prediger der Brigade des Generalmajors von Dobschütz, Verlag Edwin Runge, Berlin-Lichterfelde 1912. (in German)
- Meyers Konversationslexikon von 1846, 1. Auflage, Band 7. (in German)
- Schlesische Rundschau Nr. 6, 8. Jahrgang, 1956. (in German)
- Neuer Nekrolog der Deutschen, Band XIV, Seite 134. (in German)
- Namentliches Verzeichniß sämmtlicher hiesigen und auswärtigen zu dem Bunde der großen National Mutter-Loge zu den drei Weltkugeln in Berlin gehörigen Brüder Freimaurer .... Für das Jahr 1817, Seite 132, Druck Gebrüder Gädicke, Berlin 1817. (in German)
- Allgemeine deutsche Real-Encyklopädie für die gebildeten Stände. Conversations-Lexikon, 9. Auflage, Band 4 (von 15), F. A. Brockhaus, Leipzig 1844. (in German)
- Kurt von Priesdorff: Soldatisches Führertum, Seite 66 (Nr. 1237), Hamburg 1936–1945. (in German)
- General von Dobschütz, in: „Charakterköpfe der deutschen Befreiungskriege“, Band II („Der tolle Platen“), Seite 84–85, aus der Reihe „Jungdeutschland. Bücherschatz für die deutsche Jugend“, Hans Weberstedt (Hg.), Friedrich Engelmann Verlag, Leipzig 1913. (in German)
- Rektor Westphal: Saganer Krieger in den Befreiungskriegen, in: Niederschlesische Allgemeine Zeitung (Saganer Wochenblatt) vom 6. September 1932. (in German)
- H. Heubner: Leopold Wilhelm von Dobschütz, der Retter Wittenbergs aus der Franzosennot, in: Wittenberger Tageblatt, 10 January 1934. (in German)
- Autor ungenannt: Dem Retter aus Franzosennot! Wittenberg gedenkt der Befreiung aus Franzosennot vor 120 Jahren, in: Wittenberger Tageblatt, 15 January 1934. (in German)
