= Clemens von Raglovich =

Bavarian infantry general

Freiherr Clemens von Raglovich
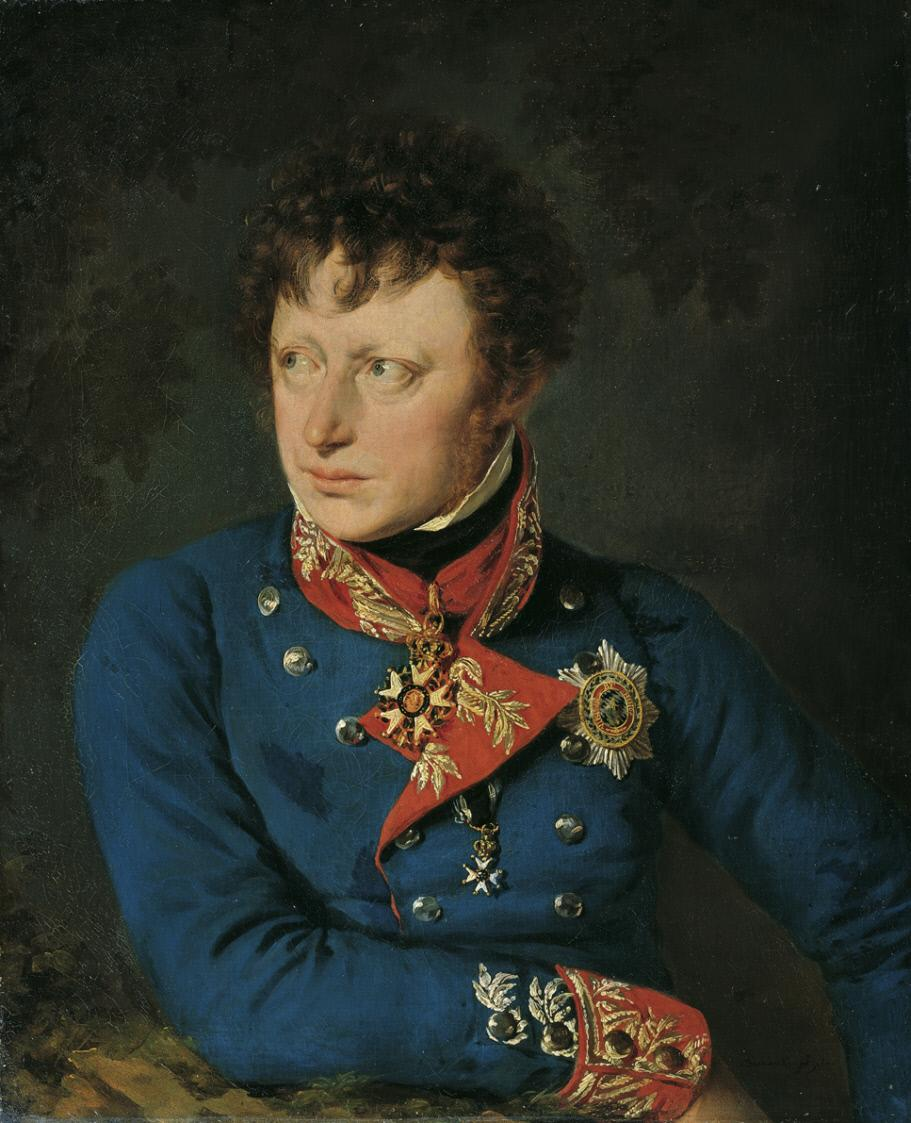
- Raglovich, portrait c. 1820s
- Born: 29 June 1766; Dillingen, Prince-Bishopric of Augsburg
- Died: 3 June 1836 (aged 69); Munich, Bavaria
- Burial place: Alter Südfriedhof, Munich
- Military career
- Allegiance: Holy Roman Empire; Kingdom of Bavaria
- Branch: Army of the Holy Roman Empire; Bavarian Army
- Service years: 1767–1829
- Rank: Colonel (HRE); General of the Infantry (Bavaria)
- Commands: Chief of the General Staff; Bavarian Reserve Army; 1st Kreis-Infanterie-Regiment (Fürstenburg)
- Conflicts: French Revolutionary Wars; Italian campaigns; War of the First Coalition; Napoleonic Wars; War of the Third Coalition; War of the Fourth Coalition; War of the Fifth Coalition; French invasion of Russia; War of the Sixth Coalition; German campaign of 1813; Battle of Bautzen (1813); Battle of Dennewitz
- Awards: Knight’s Cross of the Order of Saint Hubert; Knight’s Cross of the Military Order of Max Joseph
- Other work: Member of the Bavarian Reichsrat; Honorary fellow of the Bavarian Academy of Sciences and Humanities

Clemens or Klemens Wenzel Freiherr von Raglovich und zum Rosenhof (29 June 1766 – 3 June 1836) was a Bavarian General der Infanterie.

== Biography ==
Raglovich was born in Dillingen, the son of an army officer. He served as an officer of the Swabian Circle in the Army of the Holy Roman Empire. In 1767 he became Hauptmann and he took part in campaigns of the wars from 1793 to 1796 at the River Rhine and in 1799 in Northern Italy, where he was wounded in the battle of Novi Ligure. Meanwhile, he was advanced to Secondmajor in 1786 and to Premiermajor in 1793, while serving in the 1st Kreis-Infanterie-Regiment of Graf Friedrich zu Fürstenberg-Stühlingen. In 1799 he became Oberst.

As a result of the Treaty of Lunéville, Dillingen became part of the Bavarian Kingdom and was taken over by the Bavarian Army in 1803. Raglovich took part in the campaigns of 1805, 1806/07, and after that was promoted to Major General and Brigadier in 1806, as chief of the general staff of the 1st Royal Bavarian Division in the campaign of 1809. In the battle in Russia he was wounded near Polotsk and repatriated. He fought in the Battles of Bautzen and of Dennewitz in Prussia. In 1813 he was promoted to Lieutenant General and divisional commander, and in 1814 he supervised the deployment of the Bavarian reserve army. In 1817 he became director of the topographic bureau, and transferred it to military institution. He initiated the foundation of the main conservatory of the army library. In 1819 he became member of the Bavarian Reichsrat. One year later he took office as Chief of the General Staff, and was advanced to General der Infanterie in 1823. In 1821 he became an honorary follow of the Bavarian Academy of Sciences and Humanities, and in 1829 he became chief of the 2nd section of the War Ministry.

Raglovich died in Munich, where he is buried in the Old Southern Cemertery. The Raglovichstraße in the quarter Neuhausen of the city is named in honor of him.

== Awards ==
- Knight's Cross of the Order of Saint Hubert (Hubertus-Orden)
- Knight's Cross of the Military Order of Max Joseph

Military offices
Preceded by Johann Nepomuk Graf von Triva	Quartermaster General / Chief of the General Staff (Kingdom of Bavaria); 1820–1829(?)	Succeeded by missing
