= Battle of Dennewitz =

1813 battle during the War of the Sixth Coalition

- Part of the German campaign of the Sixth Coalition
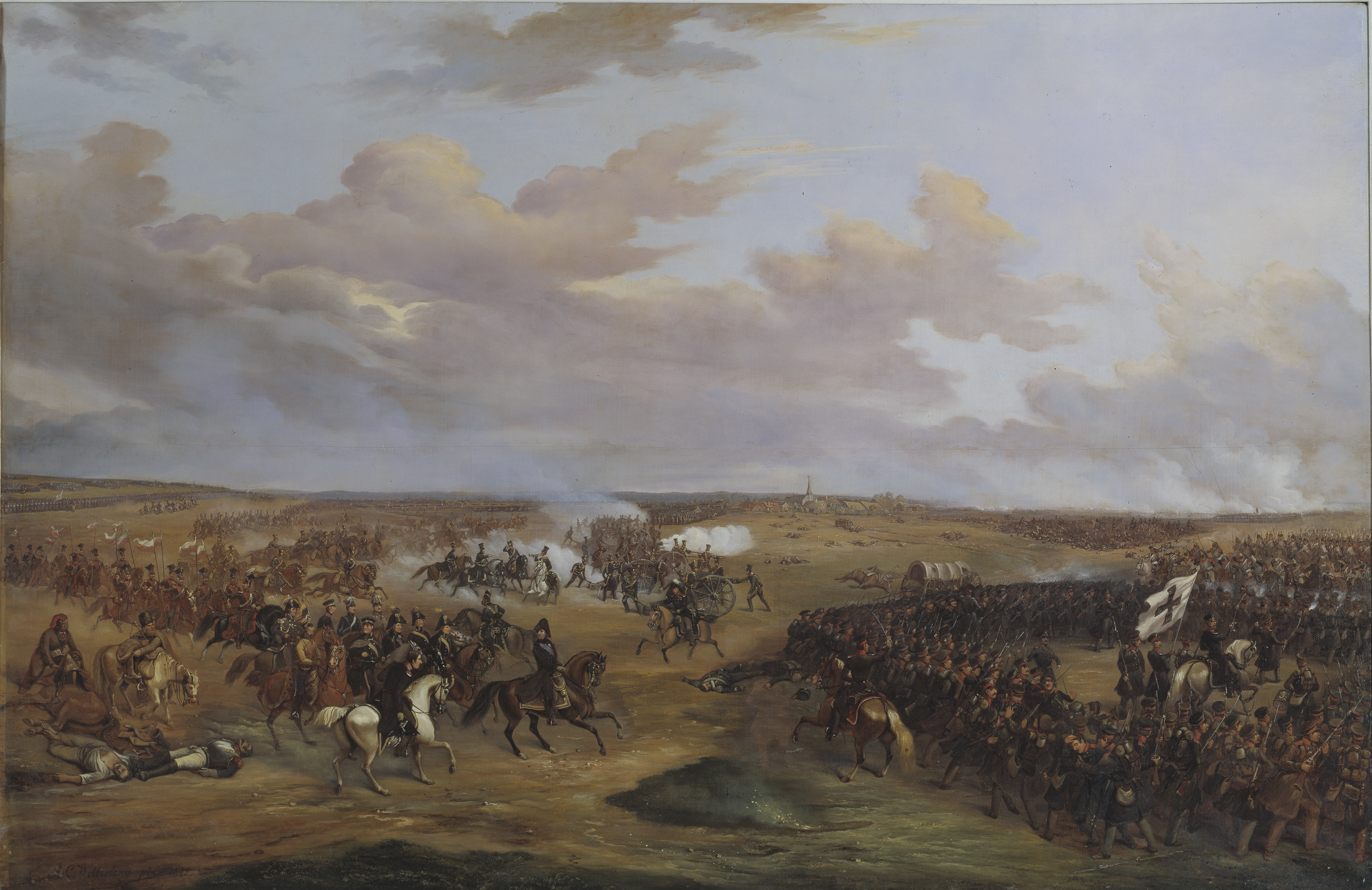
- Painting by Alexander Wetterling, 1842
| Date | 6 September 1813 |
| Location | South of Berlin 51°58′00″N 13°00′00″E |
| Result | Coalition victory |

Belligerents
| Prussia; Russia; Sweden | (First French Empire) France (Kingdom of Württemberg) Württemberg |

Commanders and leaders
| (Kingdom of Prussia) Friedrich Wilhelm von Bülow (Note: Commanded both his own and Tauentzien's corps.) (Kingdom of Prussia) Bogislav von Tauentzien (Sweden) Charles XIV John (Note: Arrived at the end of battle.) | (First French Empire) Michel Ney (First French Empire) Nicolas Oudinot |

Strength
| 80,000–85,000 (in the area); 50,000 (in battle); 150 guns | 70,000 (in the area); 45,000–60,000 (in battle); 200 guns |

Casualties and losses
| 9,700–11,000; Details: 9,000 killed or wounded 2,000 captured | 20,000–23,215; 53 guns Details: 10,000 killed or wounded 13,500 captured |
- Location within Europe

War of the Sixth Coalition:
German campaign
current battle
Napoleon in command
Napoleon not in command

The Battle of Dennewitz (German: Schlacht von Dennewitz (Note: Also German: Schlacht bei Jüterbog (Battle near Jüterbog))) took place on 6 September 1813 between French forces commanded by Marshal Michel Ney and the Sixth Coalition's Allied Army of the North commanded by Crown Prince Charles John of Sweden, Friedrich Wilhelm von Bülow and Bogislav von Tauentzien. It occurred in Dennewitz, a village in the Prussian province of Brandenburg, near Jüterbog, 40 kilometres (25 mi) southwest of Berlin. The battle marked a turning point in the German Campaign of 1813 as not only did the Allied victory end Napoleon's hopes of capturing Berlin and knocking Prussia out of the war, but the severity of the French defeat, inflicted by a primarily Prussian force, also led to the erosion of fidelity of German allies to the Napoleonic cause. The French losses, and consequent diplomatic reverses, that resulted from Dennewitz contributed greatly to Napoleon's defeat a month later at the Battle of Leipzig.

== Prelude ==
Army movements at Grossbeeren and Dennewitz

In late August 1813, Napoleon decided to order a general offensive to take Berlin, the Prussian capital, with the overall goal of knocking the Prussians out of the war. Berlin and its environs was defended by the Coalition's Army of the North, composed of Prussian, Russian, North German and Swedish troops, under the command of Crown Prince Charles John of Sweden (formerly French Marshal Bernadotte). Marshal Oudinot's three corps advanced towards this objective along three separate roads. The Army of the North was prepared for battle and well positioned along an east–west axis. The heavy fighting that took place on 23 August was essentially three isolated actions at Blankenfelde, Grossbeeren, and Sputendorf, but is known as the Battle of Grossbeeren. In each case the Allies prevailed and Oudinot retreated to Wittenberg. At this point Napoleon appointed Marshal Michel Ney to command.

== Battle ==
Ney, with around 60,000, renewed the advance on Berlin on 6 September, but moving first eastwards in order to advance on Berlin from the southeast. This was because he mistakenly expected Napoleon, away to the southeast near Dresden, to support him from this direction. Crown Prince Charles John of Sweden, learning from Oudinot's first attack at Großbeeren, wherein the French were strung out on the few north–south roads south of Berlin, laid a trap. Coalition forces were established in a defensive disposition wherein any Allied corps that came into contact with the main French thrust were to engage and hold them in order to gain time for the rest of the army to arrive and administer the killing blow via the plentiful east–west roads and open terrain of the region. Ney had decided to move his entire army down a single road and was shadowed to the north by Bülow's III Corps where they collided at Dennewitz. While this allowed Ney to maintain communications with his entire army, the single road stacked his army for miles as Bernadotte had anticipated. As a result, the battle swayed back and forth with the arrival of fresh French and Allied reinforcements throughout its course.

The Prussian General Tauentzien was at Jüterbog, blocking Ney's route to Berlin. Ney's troops reached Dennewitz as Bülow was approaching Jüterbog along an eastward route to their north. To keep Tauentzien and Bülow from uniting, the French occupied the heights north of Dennewitz, now known as the Denkmalsberg (Monument Hill). Despite early damage done to Tauentzien's Corps, Bülow saved the situation by taking the hill. This was followed by a charge of the Brandenburg Dragoons down the hill. This gave time for the Prussian units which had earlier wavered to regroup.

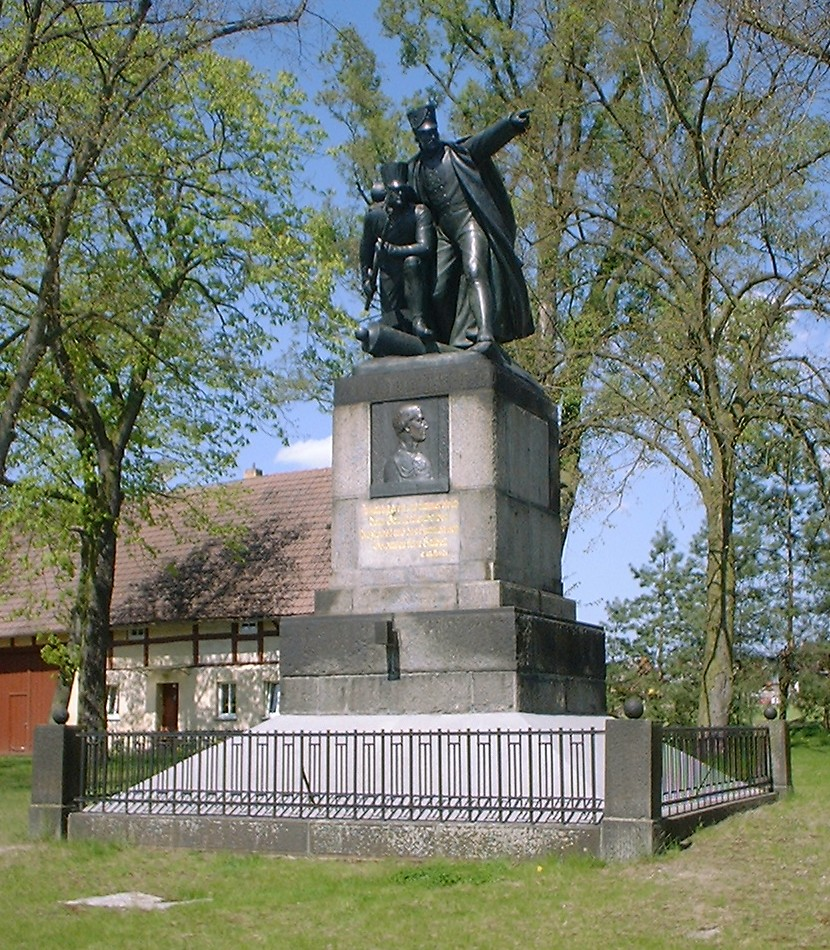
Bülow memorial

There were signs that all was not well in the French army at this time. The French Empire, bogged down and losing the Peninsular War in Spain, was seriously short of cavalry troops and mounts since the 1812 Russian campaign. As a result, there was a lack of screening and reconnaissance. The French command situation was also strained, as Oudinot was angered at being placed under Ney's command. Marshal Ney was determined to advance with all haste to Berlin and this, combined with the poor reconnaissance, allowed the French army to walk right into an assembled Allied defense. Initially forced back, Tauentzien's Corps was reinforced by Bülow's Corps and recovered the lost ground. Bülow would now assume command of the two Prussian corps for the remainder of the day.

A see-sawing battle then developed. Just as the French appeared on the verge of a victory, Ney, hindered by a lack of support from Oudinot, made a mistake that swung the battle in favor of the Allies. Having joined in the fighting personally and being unaware of the tactical situation due to a rainstorm on the battlefield, Ney ordered Oudinot to form a reserve. This pull back by Oudinot was perceived as a retreat and the Prussians redoubled the attack.

Under great pressure, the French were forced back. It was at this time that Bernadotte arrived with the rest of the Army of the North, over 45,000 men including a Russian Corps, and the Swedish Corps. He proceeded to take the French under fire from an enormous grand battery of 150 cannon, as well as a battery of British Congreve Rockets, the first artillery rockets, commanded by their inventor Sir William Congreve himself, that supported an advance of seventy fresh infantry battalions and 10,000 cavalry into the crumbling French left flank.

The French, already falling back under heavy pressure from the Prussians, became completely disorganized and were utterly routed with Prussian and Swedish cavalry in pursuit well into the following day. The French losses were heavy; suffering 10,000 casualties on the field of battle, while the Prussians lost 9,700. During the pursuit that evening, and into the following day, the Swedish and Prussian cavalry took a further 13,000 prisoners. The total French loss was tallied as Ney finally reached safety at Torgau with losses of 413 vehicles, 53 guns, 4 Eagles and 23,215 men.

The French had been decisively defeated. Ney, upon reaching Wittenberg, wrote to Berthier: "I have been totally beaten, and still do not know whether my army has reassembled."

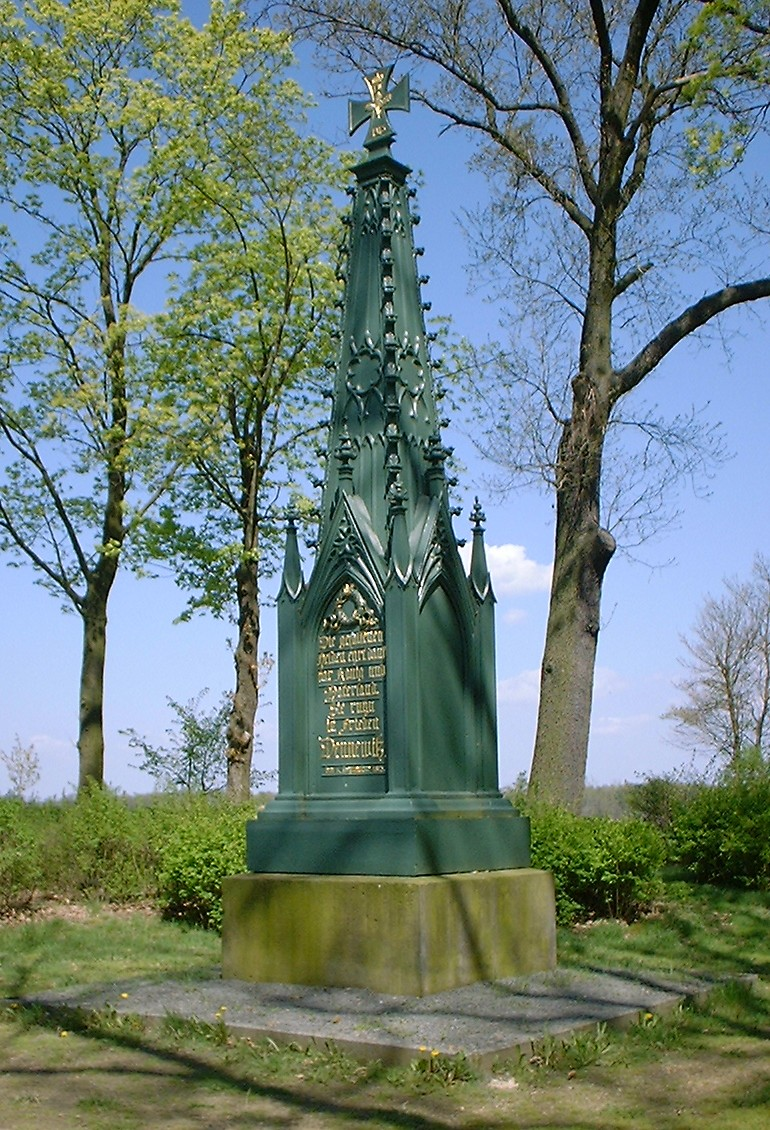
Memorial of the battle, built by Schinkel

== Aftermath ==
The Allied victory at Dennewitz sent shockwaves through Germany where French rule had become unpopular. Tyrol rose in revolt and Bavaria withdrew from the war as a result of the failure of the Berlin campaign. Other German states then wavered in their support of the French Empire. Playing on this wave of German nationalism, Bernadotte issued a proclamation that invited the Saxon Army, with whom he was personally popular, as he had commanded them during the Wagram Campaign of 1809, to defect from the French cause and join his army. Saxon discontentment was high and Saxon officers openly toasted the Swedish Crown Prince. The King of Saxony had to re-affirm the loyalty of his wavering Army in a memorandum written to Napoleon. A month later the Saxons accepted Bernadotte's invitation and switched sides at a crucial moment during the Battle of Leipzig, contributing to the French defeat.

The French defeat threw Napoleon's plans into disarray. Napoleon upbraided Ney for his failures and began to plan a new campaign which he would lead personally with the intent to not only take the Prussian capital, but to also drive Bernadotte and his army back to Stralsund and into the sea and cause a rift between the Prussian, Russian and Swedish allies. Napoleon also wished to punish what he considered perfidy on the part of his ex-Marshal as well as undermine the new Crown Prince's popularity with his adopted homeland. Gebhard von Blücher and Bernadotte kept a wary eye on the Emperor's movements, maneuvered to avoid his advances, and in mutual support advanced when the other was forced to retreat, ultimately preventing Napoleon from catching either army out in the open and leading to his decision to finally accept battle at Leipzig.

The victors of Dennewitz were decorated for their impressive feat of arms. For his generalship and courage during the battle, Bülow was awarded the Grand Cross of the Swedish Order of the Sword on the battlefield by Bernadotte and was subsequently ennobled as Graf von Dennewitz by the King of Prussia. Bernadotte was awarded the prestigious Russian Order of St. George, First Class Grand Cordon, awarded only to generals-in-chief upon victory in a battle of high importance, the grade of the Order of whom he was the only current living member, the Grand Cross of the Iron Cross (then a brand new honor) and the Austrian Order of Maria Theresa.

== Order of battle ==
=== Allies ===
Army of the North Commander: Crown Prince Charles John

- 3 Korps: Friedrich Wilhelm Freiherr von Bülow
  - 3rd Bde: Hesse-Homburg: 2nd E Prus Grenadier battalion, 3rd E Prus IR, 4th Res IR, 3rd E Prus LW IR, 1st Hussars.
  - 4th Bde: Thuemen: 4th E Prus IR, 5th Res IR, Elbe IR, E Prus Jaegers, Pommern Kurassers.
  - 5th Bde: Borstell: 1st Pommern IR, Pommern Gren bn, 2nd Res IR, 2nd Mark LW IR, Pommern Hussars.
  - 6th Bde: Krafft: Kolberg IR, 9th Res IR, 1st Mark LW IR, 1st Pommern LW Cavalry.
  - Cavalry Reserve: Oppen
    - Bde. Treskow: Brandenburg Dragoons, Koenigin Dragoons, W Prus Uhlans.
    - Bde. Malzahn: 2nd Pommern LW, 4th Kurmark LW, 2nd Kurmark LW, 2nd W Prus Dragoons.
    - Bde. Cossacks: Bychalov II Pulk, Illowaisky V Pulk.
  - Artillery 3: 12-pdr Foot (Prus-2 batteries), 12-pdr Foot (Russian-2 batteries), 6-pdr Horse (Prus-3 batteries), 6-pdr Foot (Prus-4 batteries).
- 4 Korps: Bogislav Friedrich Emanuel von Tauentzien: lightly engaged.
- Swedish Corps: Field Marshal Curt von Stedingk: lightly engaged.
- Russian Corps: lightly engaged.

=== French Empire ===
Commander: Marshal Michel Ney

- IV Corps: General of Division Henri Gatien Bertrand
  - 12th Division (French): Charles Antoine Morand: 1st Bde. Belair (Lt inf), 2nd Bde. Toussaint.
  - 15th Division (Italian): Achille Fontanelli: 1st Bde. St Andre, 2nd Bde. Moroni, 3rd Bde. Martel.
  - 38th Division (Württemberg): Frederic von Franquemont: 1st Bde. Stockmayer, 2nd Bde. Spitzenberg.
  - Cavalry IV: 24th Lt Cav Bde. Jett: (Württemberg & Poles).
  - Artillery IV: 12-pdr Foot (2 batteries), 6-pdr Horse (3 batteries).
- VII Corps: General of Division Jean Reynier
  - 24th Division (Saxon): Lecoq: 1st Bde. Brause (Guards, Lt inf), 2nd Bde. Mellentin (Grenadiers).
  - 25th Division (Saxon): Sahr: 1st Bde. Bosch (Grenadiers, Lt inf), 2nd Bde. Rissel.
  - 32nd Division (French): Pierre François Joseph Durutte: 1st Bde. Devaux (Lt inf), 2nd Bde. Jarry (Lt inf), 3rd Bde. Lindenau (Würzburg), 4th Bde. Zoltowski (Poles).
  - Cavalry VII: Saxon Bde. (Hussars, Lancers).
  - Artillery VII (Saxon): 12-pdr Foot, 6-pdr Horse (2 batteries).
- XII Corps: Marshal Nicolas Oudinot
  - 13th Division (French): Michel Marie Pacthod: 1st Bde. Bardet (Lt inf), 2nd Bde. Cacault.
  - 14th Division (French): Guilleminot: 1st Bde. Gruyer (Lt inf), 2nd Bde. Villeret.
  - 29th Division (Bavarian): Clemens von Raglovich: 1st Bde. Beckers, 2nd Bde. La Traille.
  - 29th Lt Cav Bde. (Westphalian & Hessian): Wolff
  - Artillery XII (Bavarian): 12-pdr Foot (2 batteries).
- III Cavalry Corps: General of Division Jean-Toussaint Arrighi de Casanova
  - 5th Lt Cav: Jean Thomas Guillaume Lorge: 12th Lt Cav Bde. Jacquinot, 13th Lt Cav Bde. Merlin.
  - 6th Lt Cav: Fournier: 14th Lt Cav Bde. Mouriez.
  - 4th Heavy Cav: Jean-Marie Defrance: Bde. Avice (Dragoons), Bde. Quinette (Dragoons).
  - 8th Lt Cav (Poles): Kruckowiecky:

== Citations ==
| Preceded by Battle of San Marcial | Napoleonic Wars; Battle of Dennewitz | Succeeded by Second Battle of Kulm |
