= Ernst von Dobschütz =

German theologian, textual critic, author and professor

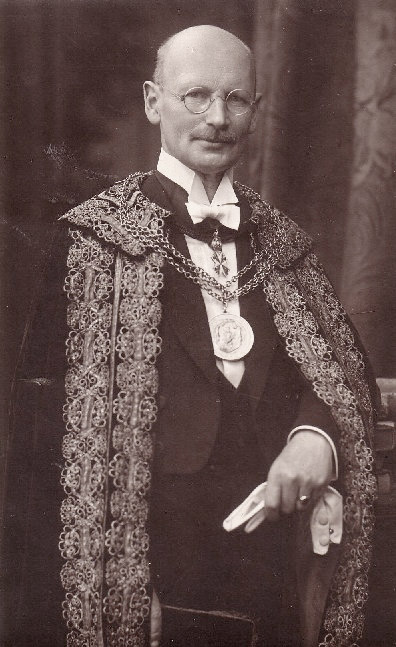
- Ernst von Dobschütz, December 1922
- Born: Ernst Adolf Alfred Oskar Adalbert von Dobschütz; 9 October 1870; Halle, Germany
- Died: 20 May 1934 (aged 63); Halle, Germany
- Occupations: author, professor, theologian

Ernst Adolf Alfred Oskar Adalbert von Dobschütz (9 October 1870 – 20 May 1934) was a German theologian, textual critic, author of numerous books and professor at the University of Halle, the University of Breslau, and the University of Strasbourg. He also lectured in the United States and Sweden.

He was born and died in Halle.

== Life ==
Dobschütz was born into an old noble family of Silesia. He was a son of the Prussian colonel Adalbert von Dobschütz de Basse-Silesia and of his second wife Anna, Baroness von Seckendorff. His older half-brother (from his father's first marriage) was Prussian general of division Carl von Seckendorff. On 29 December 1919, in Halle (Saale), Dobschütz married Karin von Kronhelm (24 March 1893 in Breslau, † 7 May 1986 in Halle), daughter of the Prussian general of division Curt von Kronhelm and Clara Schwarz. Their marriage remained childless.

In 1888 he began his theological studies at the University of Leipzig under professors Franz Delitzsch and Christoph Ernst Luthardt. In 1910, he became professor in the University of Breslau; in 1913, he accepted a call to the University of Halle, where he taught until his death in 1934, with the exception of the years 1913 and 1914, when he taught at Harvard University.

He examined some manuscripts like Codex Tischendorfianus III.

After the death of textual critic Caspar René Gregory, Dobschütz became his successor, and in 1933 he expanded the list of New Testament manuscripts, increasing the number of papyri from 19 to 48, the number of uncials from 169 to 208, the number of minuscules from 2326 to 2401, and the number of lectionaries from 1565 to 1609. His recovery work influenced the later work of Kurt Aland, who revived the tradition in 1953 and further expanded the number of New Testament manuscripts.

A dedicated Christian, Von Dobschütz was a member of the Order of Saint John (Bailiwick of Brandenburg). He was a member of German National People's Party from 1919 to its dissolution in 1933.

== Honours ==
- Knight of Justice (Rechtsritter) of Saint John
- Membership in the Society of Biblical Literature in (USA, 1913)
- Red Cross-Medallion 3. Class (World War I)
- Red Cross-Medallion 2. Class (World War I)
- On 13 January 1934 (the 120th anniversary of the capture of Wittenberg in the Napoleaonic wars by troops of Generalleutnant Leopold Wilhelm von Dobschütz) part of the Große Rothemarkstraße was renamed the Dobschützstraße, with Dobschütz representing the family.

== Works ==
- 1894: Studien zur Textkritik der Vulgata (in German). Leipzig: J. C. Hinrichs’sche Buchhandlung. 1894.
- 1899: Christusbilder. Untersuchungen zur christlichen Legende. Texte u. Untersuchungen zur Geschichte der altchristlichen Literatur (in German). Leipzig: J. C. Hinrichs’sche Buchhandlung. 1899.
- 1902: «Der Roman in der Altchristlichen Literatur», in Die Deutsche Rundschau 111 (1902)
- 1902: Die urchristlichen Gemeinden; Sittengeschichtliche Bilder; Leipzig: J. C. Hinrichs'sche Buchhandlung, 1902
- 1902: «Der Prozess Jesu nach den Acta Pilati», in Zeitschrift für die neutestamentliche Wissenschaft und die Kunde der älteren Kirche, 1902
- 1904: Probleme des apostolischen Zeitalters. Fünf Vorträge in Hannover im Oktober 1903; Leipzig: J. C. Hinrichs'sche Buchhandlung, 1904
- 1904: Christian Life in the Primitive Church; New York : Putnam's Verlag, 1904
- 1905: "Sakrament und Symbol"; in : Studien und Kritiken, 1905
- 1906: Das apostolische Zeitalter; Tübingen: Mohr, 1906
- 1908: Das Christentum in Wissenschaft und Bildung; en collaboration avec C. Cornill, W. Herrmann, W. Staerk; Leipzig : Quelle & Meyer, 1908
- 1908: "Griechentum und Christentum"; in : Paul Herre (Hg.): Das Christentum; Leipzig: Quelle & Meyer, 1908
- 1909: The Apostolic Age; London : Philip Green, 1909; Boston : Boston American Unitarian Association, 1910
- 1909: Die Thessalonicher-Briefe; Göttingen: Vandenhoeck & Ruprecht, 1909 (Nachdruck 1974)
- 1909: "Wann las Victor von Capua sein Neues Testament?"; in : Zeitschrift für Neutestamentliche Wissenschaft 10 (1909)
- 1912: Das Decretum Gelasianum de Libris recipiendis et non recipiendis; Leipzig: J. C. Hinrichs'sche Buchhandlung, 1912
- 1914: The Influence of the Bible on Civilisation; Edinburgh 1914; New York: Scribners, (Reimpression : New York : Frederick Ungar Publishing, 1959; Bertrams Print on Demand, Grande-Bretagne 2005; Lightning Source Inc. 2005)
- 1917: "Das Urchristentum im Lichte unserer Zeit"; in: Theologische Studien und Kritiken, Sonderdruck für die Mitglieder der Sächsischen Kirchlichen Konferenz 1917; Gotha: Friedrich Andreas Perthes, 1917
- 1921: "Vom vierfachen Schriftsinn. Die Geschichte einer Theorie"; in: Harnack-Ehrung: Beiträge zur Kirchengeschichte ihrem Lehrer Adolf von Harnack zu seinem siebzigsten Geburtstag (7. Mai 1921) dargebracht von einer Reihe seiner Schüler; Leipzig 1921
- 1923: Eberhard Nestle's Einführung in das Griechische Neue Testament; Göttingen: Vandenhoeck & Ruprecht, 1923
- 1924–33: "Zur Liste der neutestamentlichen Handschriften"; in : Zeitschrift für die neutestamentliche Wissenschaft und die Kunde der älteren Kirche 23 (1924), pp. 248–264; 25 (1926), pp. 299–306; 27 (1928), pp. 216–222; 32 (1933), pp. 185–206
- 1926: Der Apostel Paulus; 1ère partie : "Seine weltgeschichtliche Bedeutung'"; Halle: Buchhandlung des Waisenhauses, 1926
- 1927: Das Neue Testament; Halle: Buchhandlung des Waisenhauses, 1927
- 1927: Vom Auslegen des Neuen Testaments. Drei Reden; Göttingen: Vandenhoeck & Ruprecht, 1927
- 1928: Der Apostel Paulus; 2ème partie : "Seine Stellung in der Kunst"; Halle: Buchhandlung des Waisenhauses, 1928
- 1928: "Matthäus als Rabbi und Katechet"; in : Zeitschrift für die neutestamentliche Wissenschaft und die Kunde der älteren Kirche, 1928 (Imprimé à part : Wissenschaftliche Buchgesellschaft, Darmstadt 1980)
- 1929: "Die fünf Sinne im Neuen Testament"; in: Journal of Biblical Literature, 1929
- 1929: "Bludau. Die Schriftfälschungen der Häretiker. Milne, The Gospels of Augustine. Glunz, Die lat. Vorlage der westsächs. Evangelienversion"; in: Gnomon, Cahier 5 (1929), p. 330 et sqq.; Berlin: Verlag der Weidmannschen Buchhandlung, 1929
- 1929: "Die Bekehrung des Paulus", in Repertorium für Kunstwissenschaft 50 (1929)
- 1932: Das Apostolicum in biblisch-theologischer Beleuchtung; Gießen: Toepelmann, 1932
- 1934: «Prädestination»; in Theologische Studien und Kritiken 106 (1934), p. 9 et sqq.; Gotha: Leopold Klotz, 1934
- 1934: Die Bibel im Leben der Völker; Witten: Luther-Verlag, 1934; Berlin: Evangelische Verlagsanstalt, 1936 (1954^{2})
- 1934: «Zum Wortschatz und Stil des Römerbriefs»; in Zeitschrift für die neutestamentliche Wissenschaft und die Kunde der älteren Kirche 33 (1934), p. 51 et sqq.; Gießen: Alfred Töpelmann, 1934

== See also ==
- Leopold Wilhelm von Dobschütz
