= Star of the Grand Cross of the Iron Cross =

Highest military decoration of the Kingdom of Prussia and the German Empire

The Star of the Grand Cross of the Iron Cross (German: Stern zum Großkreuz des Eisernen Kreuzes) was the highest military decoration of the Kingdom of Prussia and the German Empire. It was considered a senior decoration to the Grand Cross of the Iron Cross.

The Star of the Grand Cross of the Iron Cross was awarded to the most outstanding of generals who performed feats of leadership to the extreme benefit of the Prussian and later German state. It was awarded only twice, a century apart, to Generalfeldmarschall Gebhard von Blücher in 1815 for his part in the victory over Napoleon at the Battle of Waterloo in the Napoleonic Wars, and to Generalfeldmarschall Paul von Hindenburg on 25 March 1918 for his conduct of the 1918 German spring offensive in World War I. Hindenburg had received the Grand Cross of the Iron Cross on 9 December 1916.

The award is commonly known as "Blücher's Star" (Blücherstern) after its first recipient.

A World War II version of the Star was devised, but never formally instituted or awarded. Following the Allied victory in May 1945, the United States Army seized the only known prototype, which had been stored in a bunker. It is now a part of the collection of the Museum of the United States Military Academy (USMA) in West Point, New York.

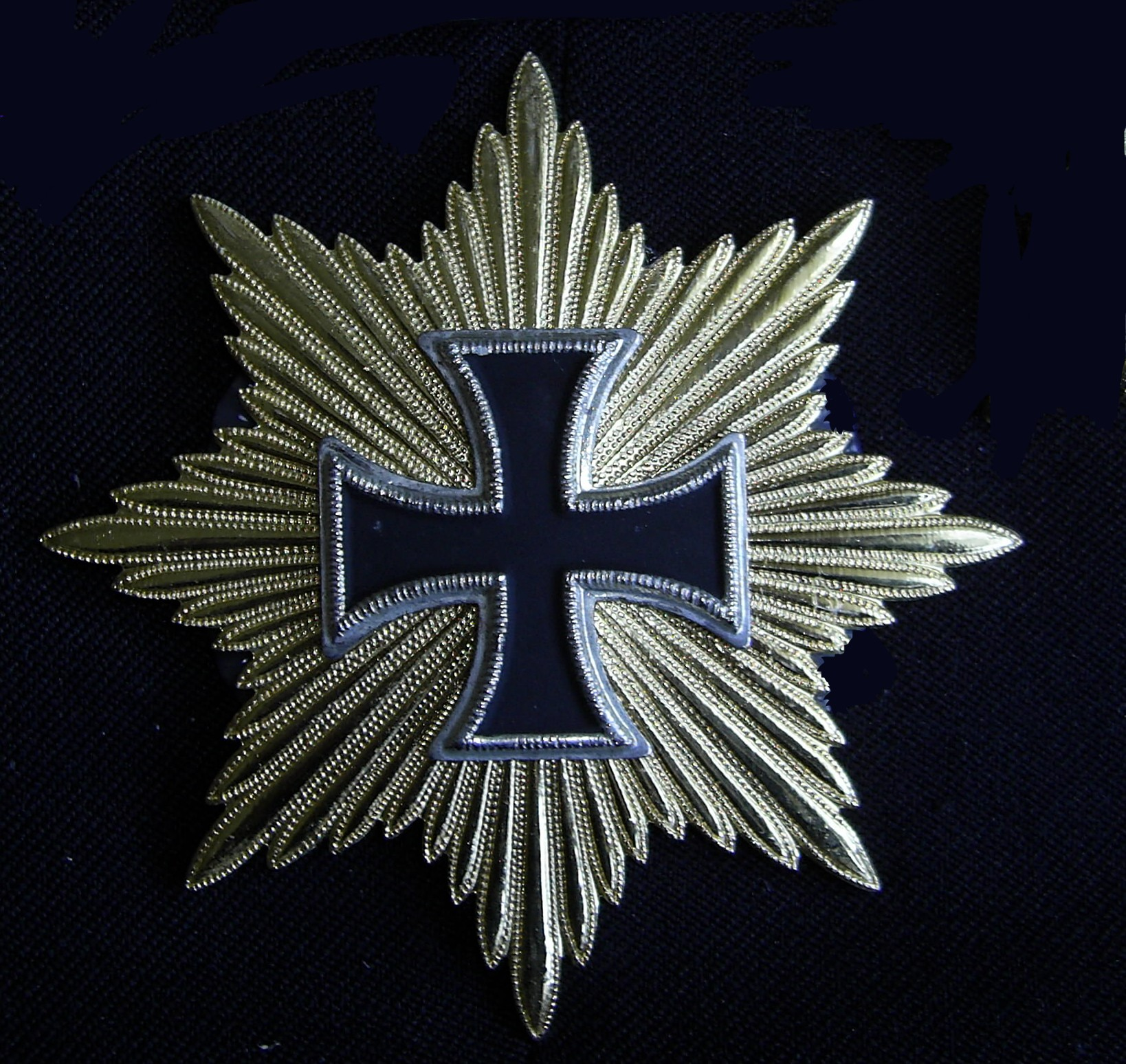
1813 Star of the Grand Cross of the Iron Cross

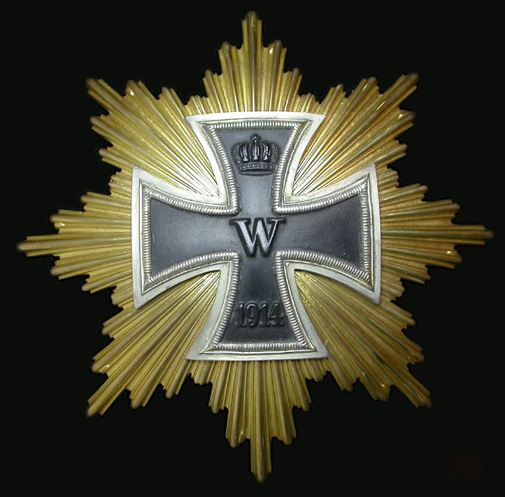
1914 Star of the Grand Cross of the Iron Cross

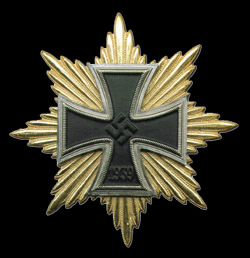
1939 Star of the Grand Cross of the Iron Cross Prototype

== See also ==
- Iron Cross
- Grand Cross of the Iron Cross
