= Johann Nepomuk von Triva =

German general (1755–1827)

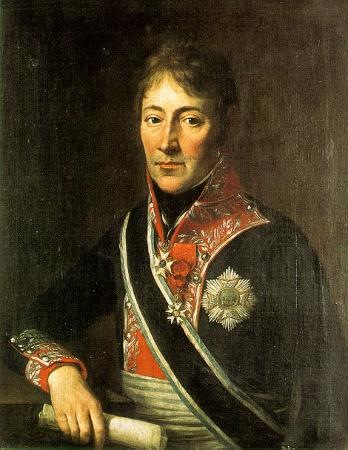
Johann Nepomuk Graf von Triva

Johann Nepomuk Joseph Florian, Graf von Triva (20 September 1755 – 8 April 1827) was a Bavarian General der Artillerie. He was the first War Minister of the Bavarian kingdom.

== Biography ==
Triva, born in Munich, joined the cadets corps of the Bavarian army on 1 September 1766 after his parents death. On 26 September 1772 he was transferred to the genie troops in the rank of a Fähnrich, became Leutnant in 1777, Hauptmann in 1780, Major in 1785, Oberstleutnant in 1791 and Oberst in 1796. In 1779 he married Floriana von Velhorn, a daughter of a Privy Councillor in Amberg, Johann Wolfgang Alois von Velhorn (1734–1789), by his marriage to Sybilla von Loefen zu Diepoltsdorf. Floriana died in 1791. In 1797 he married as his second wife a maid of honour of the deceased Countess Elizabeth Augusta, a Fräulein van der Stock. In 1799 he became commander of the Fortress and Regiment Command in Mannheim, and in 1800 commander of Wrede's brigade. In the same year he was advanced to Major General and became Generalquartiermeister (after 1805 Chef des Generalstabes) of the army in 1802. In the rank of Lieutenant General, he additionally was head of the privy war bureau (Geheimes Kriegsbüro) from 1804 to 1808. On 27 March 1808 he became minister of war. The name of this position was Minister-Staatssekretär im Kriegswesen (literally: minister state secretary of warfare) until 1814, afterwards Dirigierender Minister des Kriegswesens (literally: directing minister of warfare) until 1817, and at last Staatsminister der Armee (literally: state minister of the army). Until 1817, King Maximilian I Joseph of Bavaria personally held the command of the army. In 1817 he received honorary membership of the Bavarian Academy of Sciences and Humanities. During his period as war minister, Triva was advanced to General der Artillerie by Maximilian I. On 30 September 1822 he was retired. Meanwhile, the post of Chef des Generalstabes had been transferred to Raglovich in 1820.

Graf von Triva died in his hometown and is buried in the Old Southern Cemetery. He was also a member of Adam Weishaupt's Order of Illuminati.

The Trivastraße in the quarter Neuhausen of Munich and the Turm Triva (Triva Tower) of the Fortness of Ingolstadt were named in honor of him.

== Awards ==
- Kurpfalz-Bavarian Military Decoration (19 February 1795) - predecessor of the Military Order of Max Joseph
- Grand Officier of the Légion d'honneur (27 January 1806)
- Grand Cross of the Military Order of Max Joseph (1 March 1806) - 1st Grosskanzler (Grand Chancellor) of the Order (22 March 1806)
- Knight's Cross of the Order of Saint Hubert (20 October 1820)
- Grand Cross of the Merit Order of the Bavarian Crown (25 June 1813)
- Order of St. Anna, 1st class (Russia, 23 January 1815)
- Honorary member of the Bavarian Academy of Sciences and Humanities (10 April 1818)
- Naming of "Triva" for the red tower on Ingolstadt fortifications by King Ludwig I (1842)

== Bibliography ==
- Adolf Erhardt: Johann Nepomuk von Triva - K. B. General der Artillerie - Der erste Kriegsminister Bayerns (1755-1827), C. C. Buchner Verlag, Bamberg, 1892, p. 157
- Eugen von Frauenholz: Der Übergang vom Söldnerheer zum Volksheer unter dem ersten bayerischen Kriegsminister Grafen von Triva, in Zeitschrift für bayerische Landesgeschichte, vol. 9, 1936

== References and notes ==
Military offices
Preceded by missing	Quartermaster General / Chief of the General Staff (Kingdom of Bavaria); 1802–1820	Succeeded by Clemens von Raglovich
Government offices
Preceded by New title	Ministers of War (Bavaria); 1808–1822	Succeeded by Nikolaus Hubert Freiherr von Maillot de la Treille
