= Dennewitz =

Coordinates: 51°58′N 13°00′E

Dennewitz is a village of Germany, in the federal state and old Prussian province of Brandenburg, near Jüterbog, 40 km. S.W. from Berlin. It is part of the municipality of Niedergörsdorf, Teltow-Fläming district.

== History ==
It is memorable as the scene of a decisive battle on the 6 September 1813, during the Napoleonic Wars, specifically the War of the Sixth Coalition, in which Marshal Ney, with an army of 58,000 French, Saxons and Poles, was defeated with great loss by an allied army with 85,000 Prussians, Swedes and Russians led by Prussian generals von Bülow (afterwards Count Bülow of Dennewitz) and Tauentzien and the commander of the Allied Army of the North, Swedish Crown Prince and Regent Carl Johan. The Swedish corps was commanded by Field Marshal Kurt von Stedingk. The site of the battle is marked by an iron obelisk.

During the battle, and in the subsequent pursuit, Napoleon's army lost 23,215 men, 53 cannons and 413 supply vehicles. The Army of the North lost 9,700 men, mostly Prussians from Von Bulow's corps.

== Pictures ==
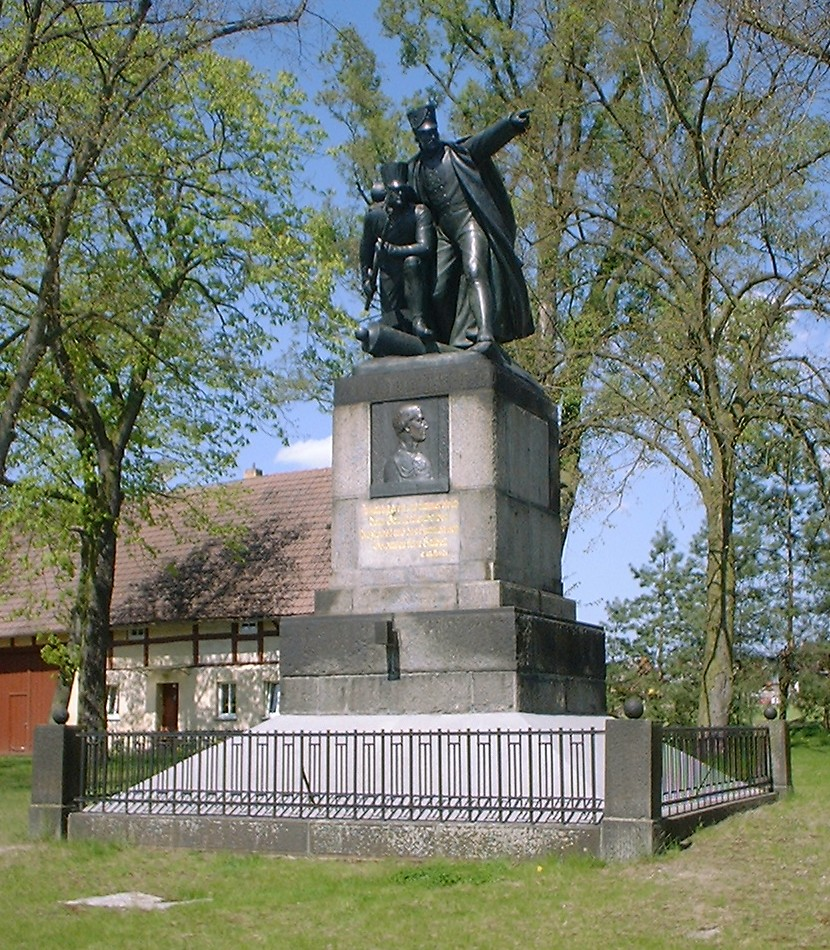
Bülow memorial

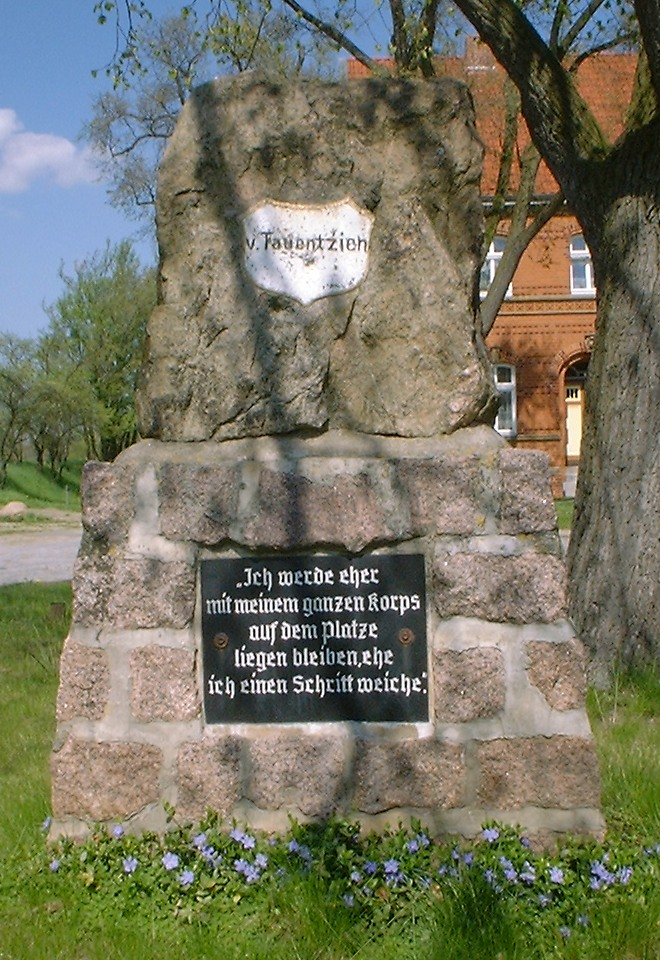
Tauentzien memorial
