= Grand Cross of the Iron Cross =

Decoration for victorious generals of the Prussian Army and its allies

The Grand Cross of the Iron Cross (German: Großkreuz des Eisernen Kreuzes) was a decoration intended for victorious generals of the Prussian Army and its allies. It was the second highest class of the Iron Cross, following the Star of the Grand Cross of the Iron Cross, which was awarded only twice. Along with the Iron Cross 1st and 2nd Class, the Grand Cross was founded on 10 March 1813, during the Napoleonic Wars. It was renewed in 1870 for the Franco-Prussian War and again in 1914 for World War I. In 1939, when Adolf Hitler renewed the Iron Cross as a German (rather than strictly Prussian) decoration, he also renewed the Grand Cross.

The Grand Cross of the Iron Cross was twice the size of the Iron Cross and was worn with a ribbon around the neck. The later Knight's Cross of the Iron Cross, instituted in 1939, was also worn from the neck; it was smaller than the Grand Cross but larger than the Iron Cross.

== 1813 Grand Cross ==
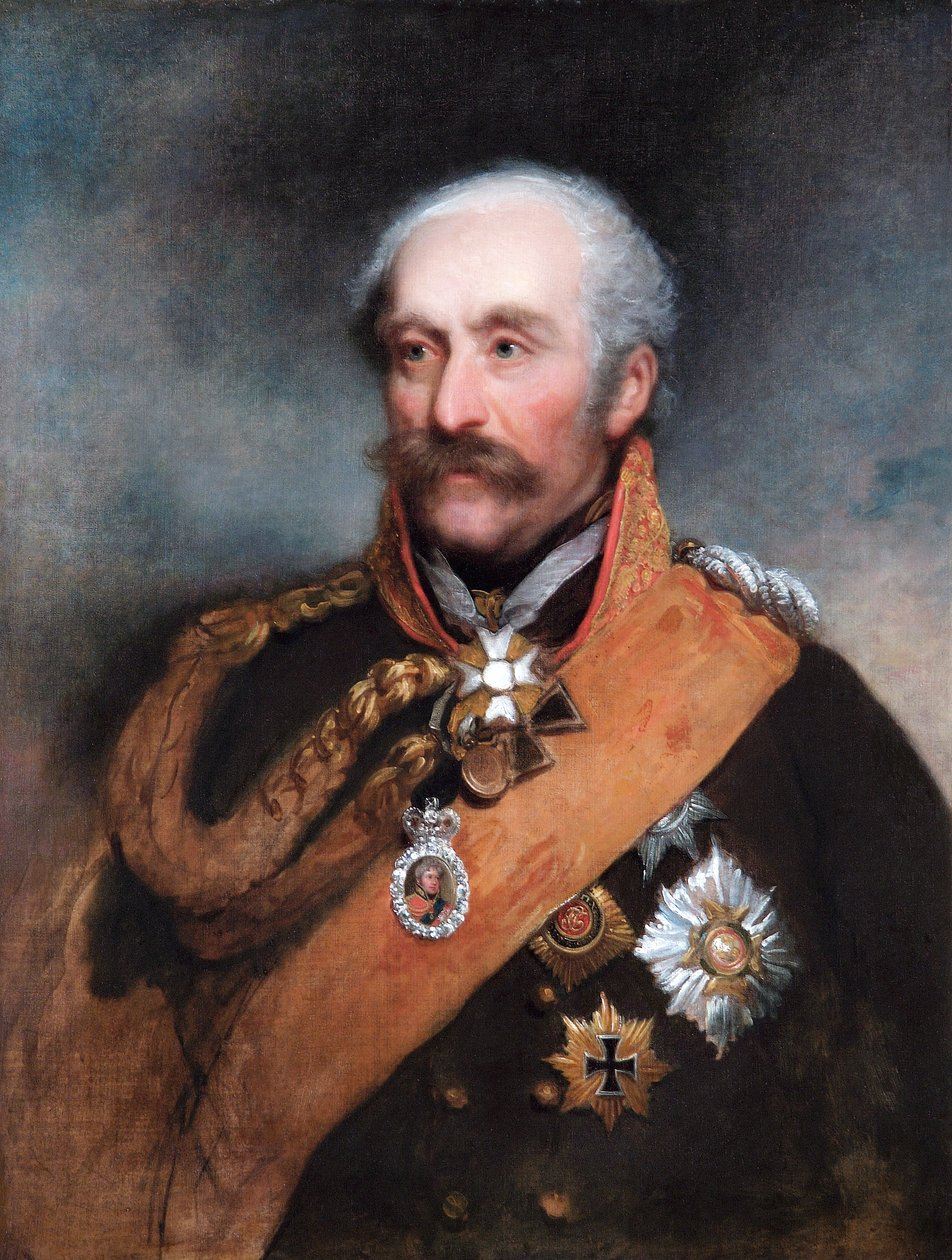
Generalfeldmarschall Gebhard von Blücher wearing the 1813 Grand Cross of the Iron Cross and the Star to the Grand Cross (Blücherstern).

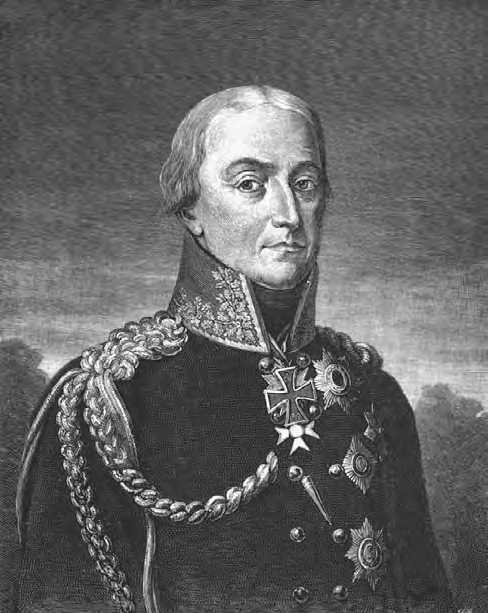
General Friedrich von Bülow wearing the 1813 Grand Cross.

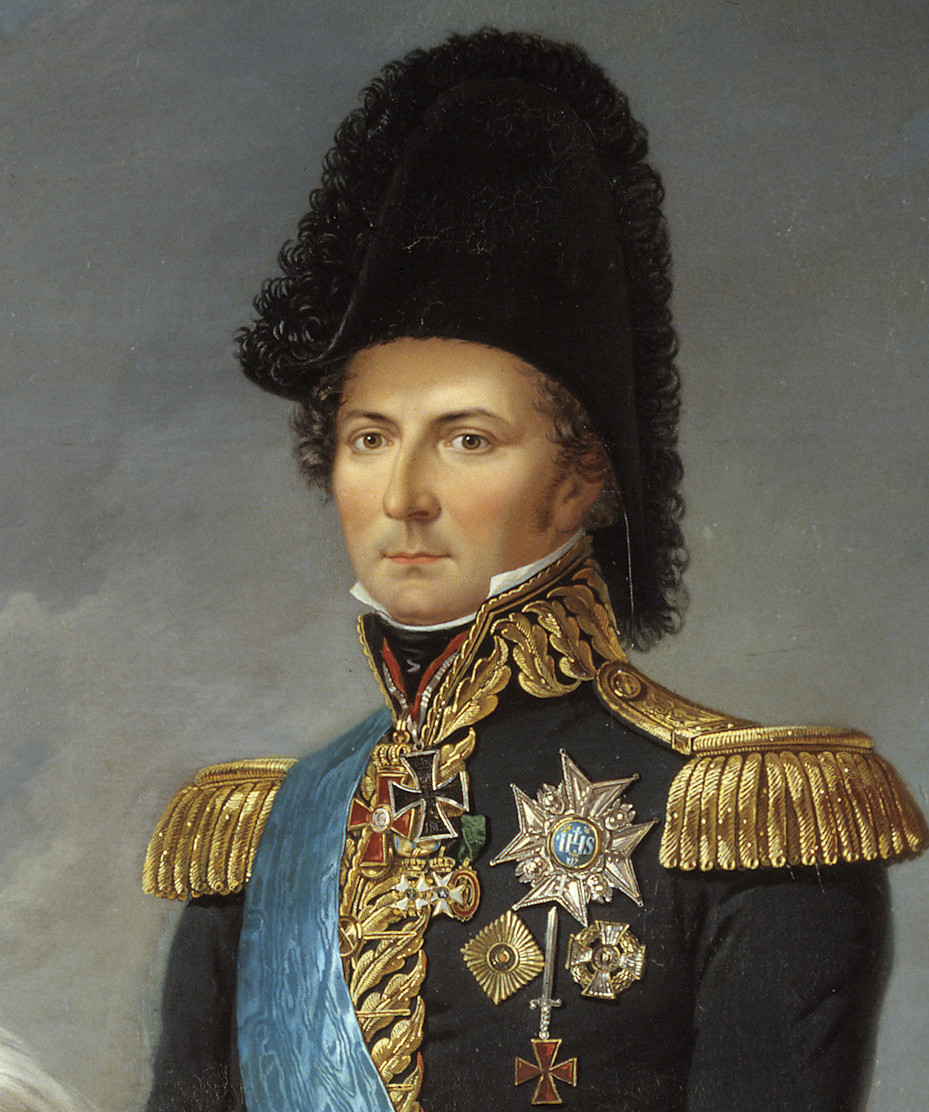
Crown Prince Charles John of Sweden, wearing the 1813 Grand Cross of the Iron Cross.

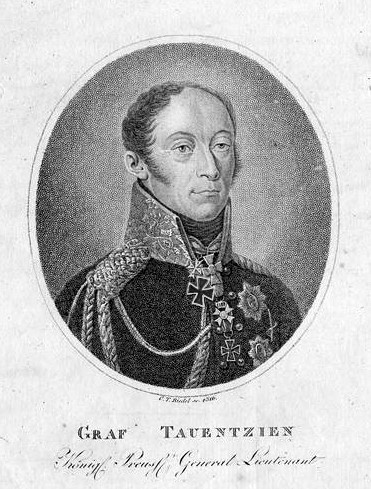
General Bogislav von Tauentzien wearing the 1813 Grand Cross.

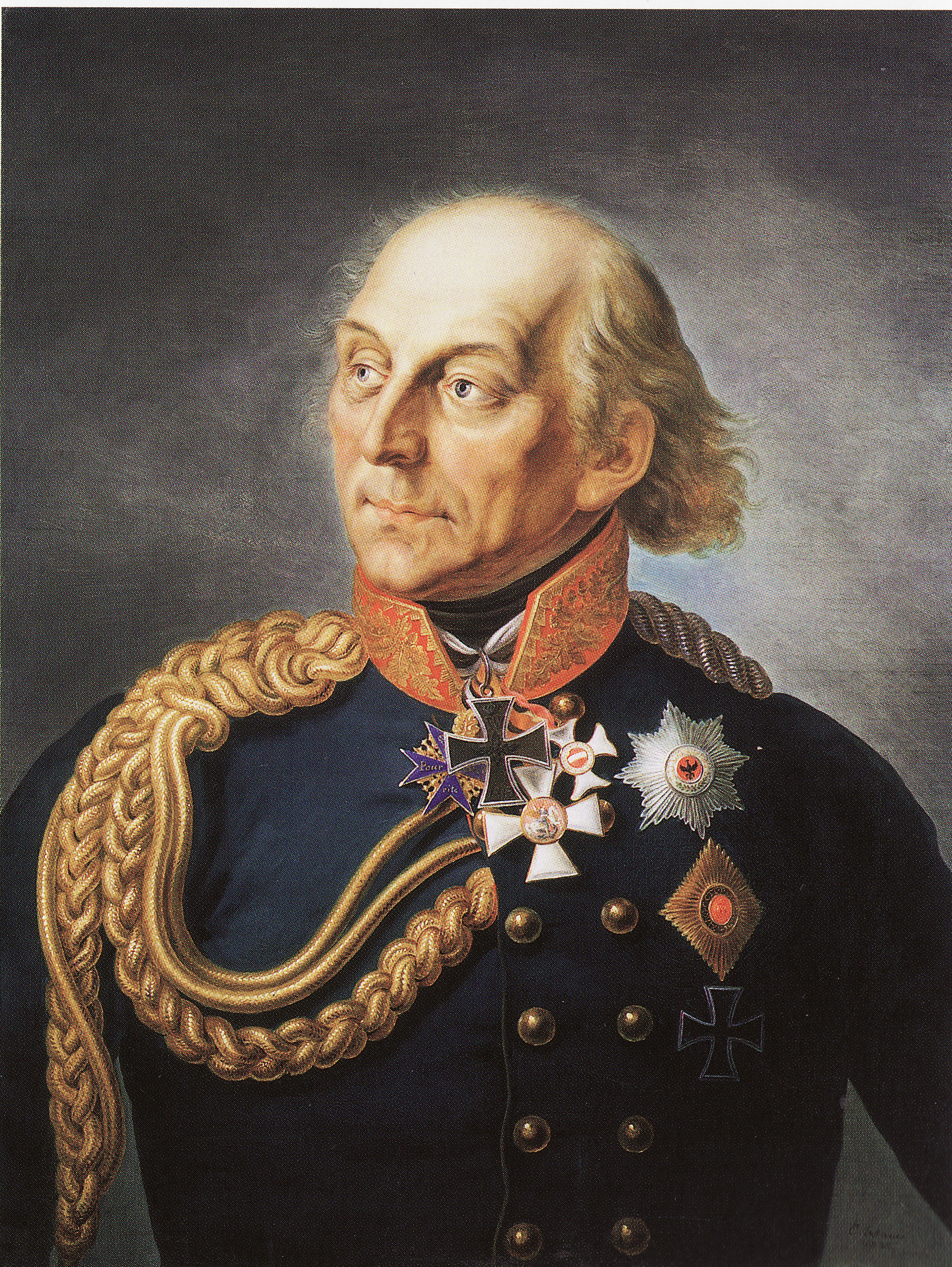
Generalfeldmarschall Ludwig Yorck von Wartenburg wearing the 1813 Grand Cross.

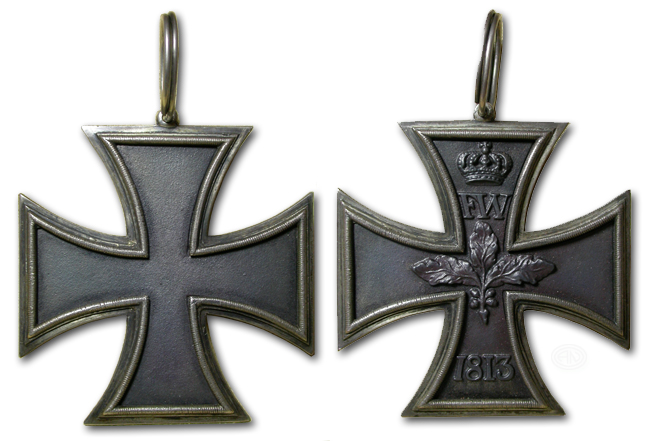
1813 Grand Cross of the Iron Cross.

Five men received the 1813 Grand Cross of the Iron Cross for actions during the Napoleonic Wars:

- Gebhard Leberecht von Blücher, commander of Prussian forces at the Battle of Waterloo, later also awarded the Star of the Grand Cross of the Iron Cross
- Friedrich Wilhelm von Bülow
- Crown Prince Charles John of Sweden (Jean-Baptiste Bernadotte) - earlier a Marshal under Napoleon, after becoming regent and crown prince of Sweden, he joined the Sixth Coalition against Napoleon.
- Bogislav Friedrich Emanuel von Tauentzien
- Ludwig Yorck von Wartenburg

== 1870 Grand Cross ==
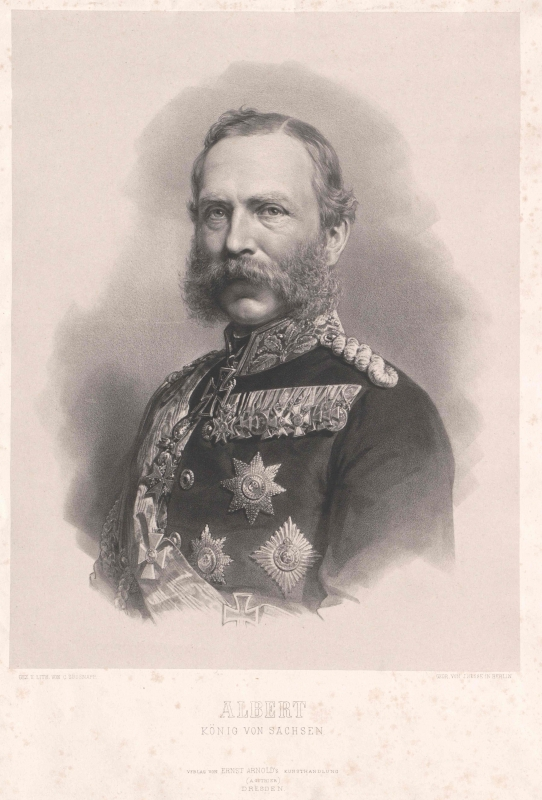
Albert, Crown Prince of Saxony wearing the 1870 Grand Cross.

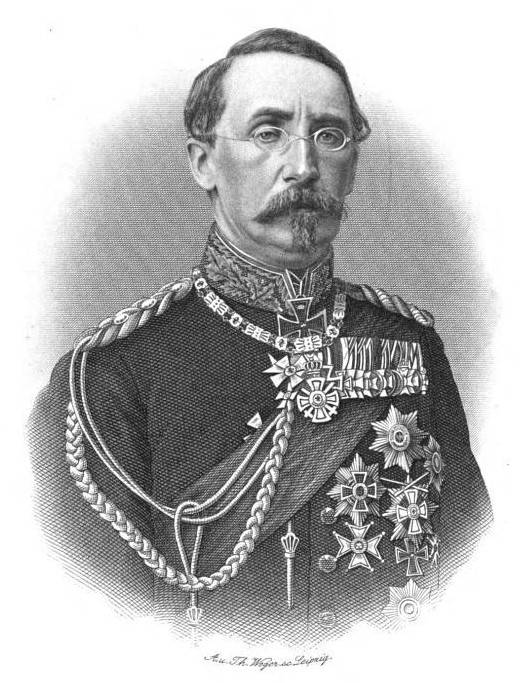
General August Karl von Goeben wearing the 1870 Grand Cross.

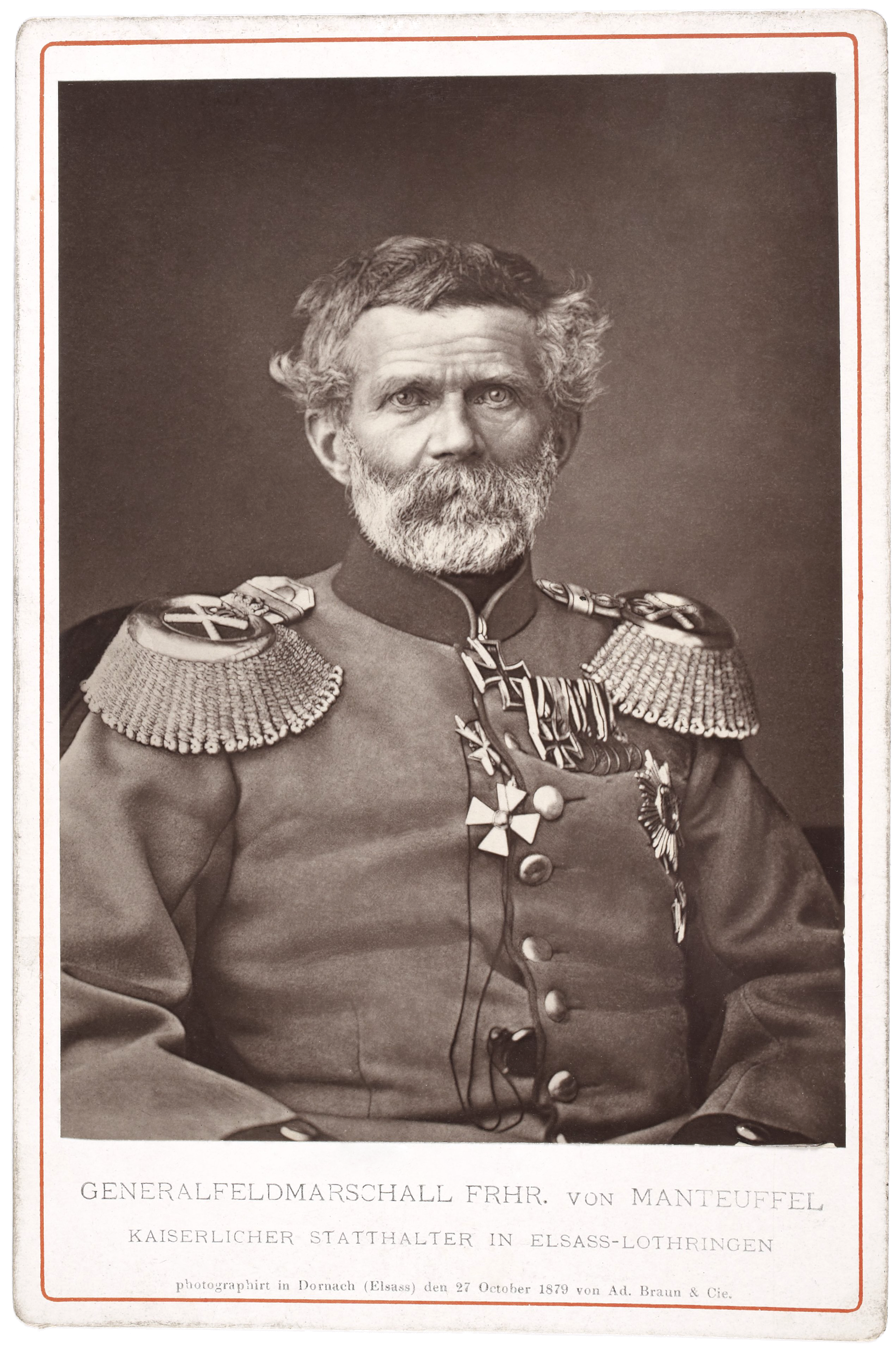
Generalfeldmarschall Edwin Freiherr von Manteuffel wearing the 1870 Grand Cross.

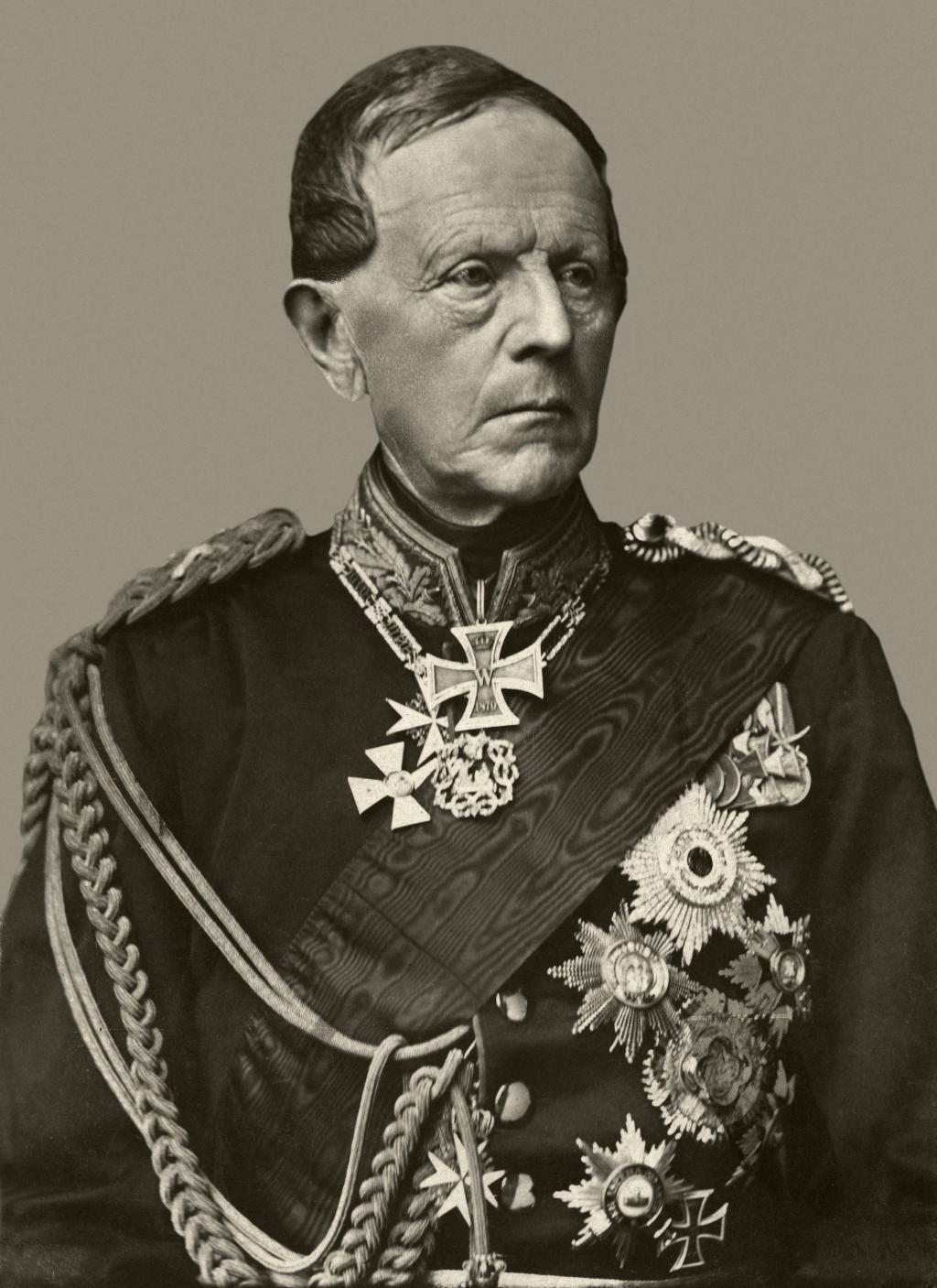
Generalfeldmarschall Helmuth von Moltke the Elder wearing the 1870 Grand Cross.

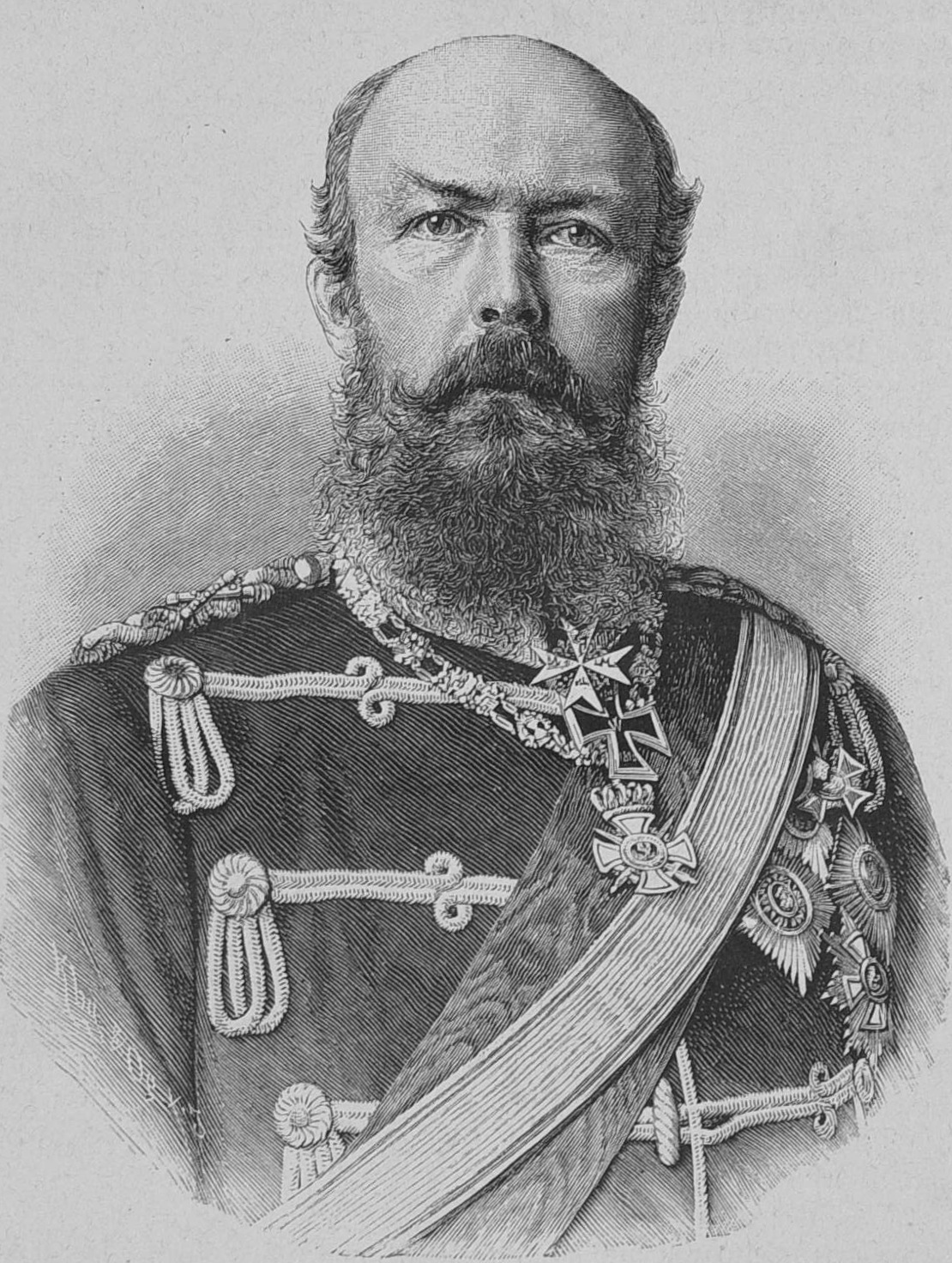
Prince Frederick Charles of Prussia wearing the 1870 Grand Cross.

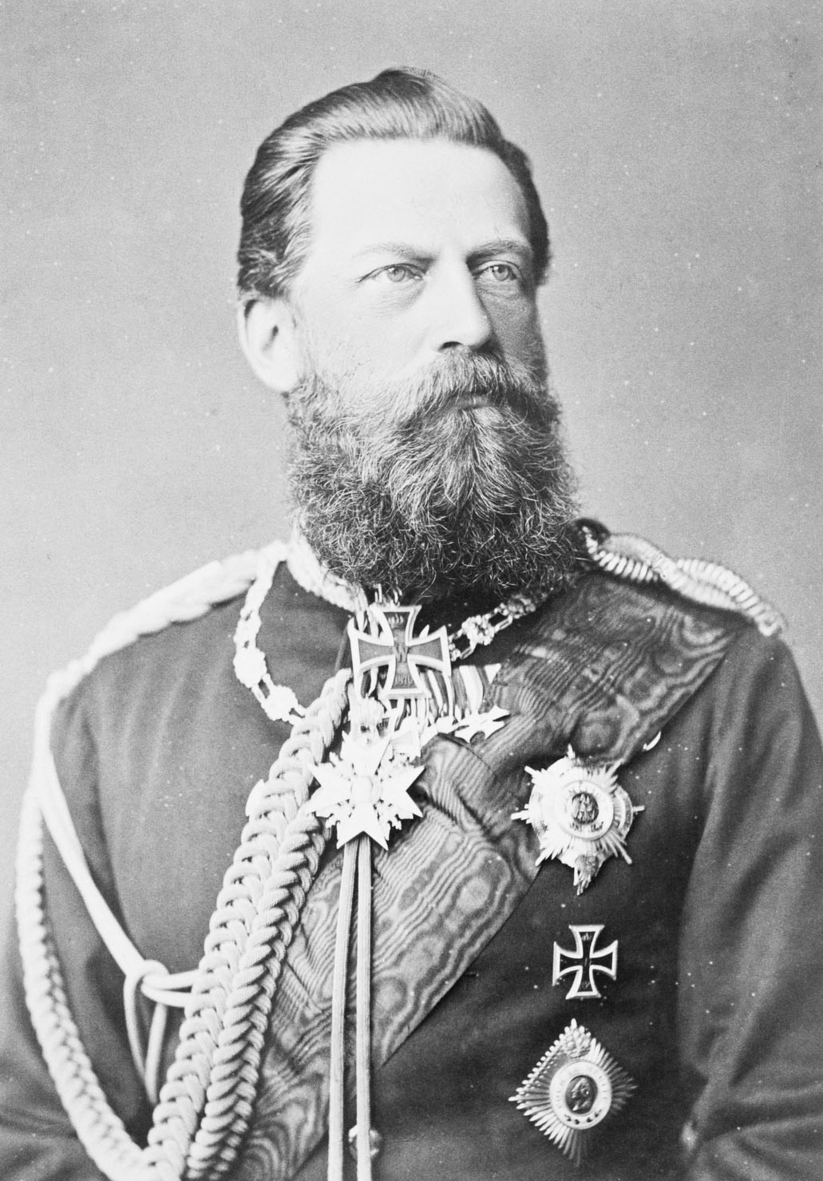
Crown Prince Friedrich Wilhelm of Prussia (later Kaiser Friedrich III) wearing the 1870 Grand Cross.

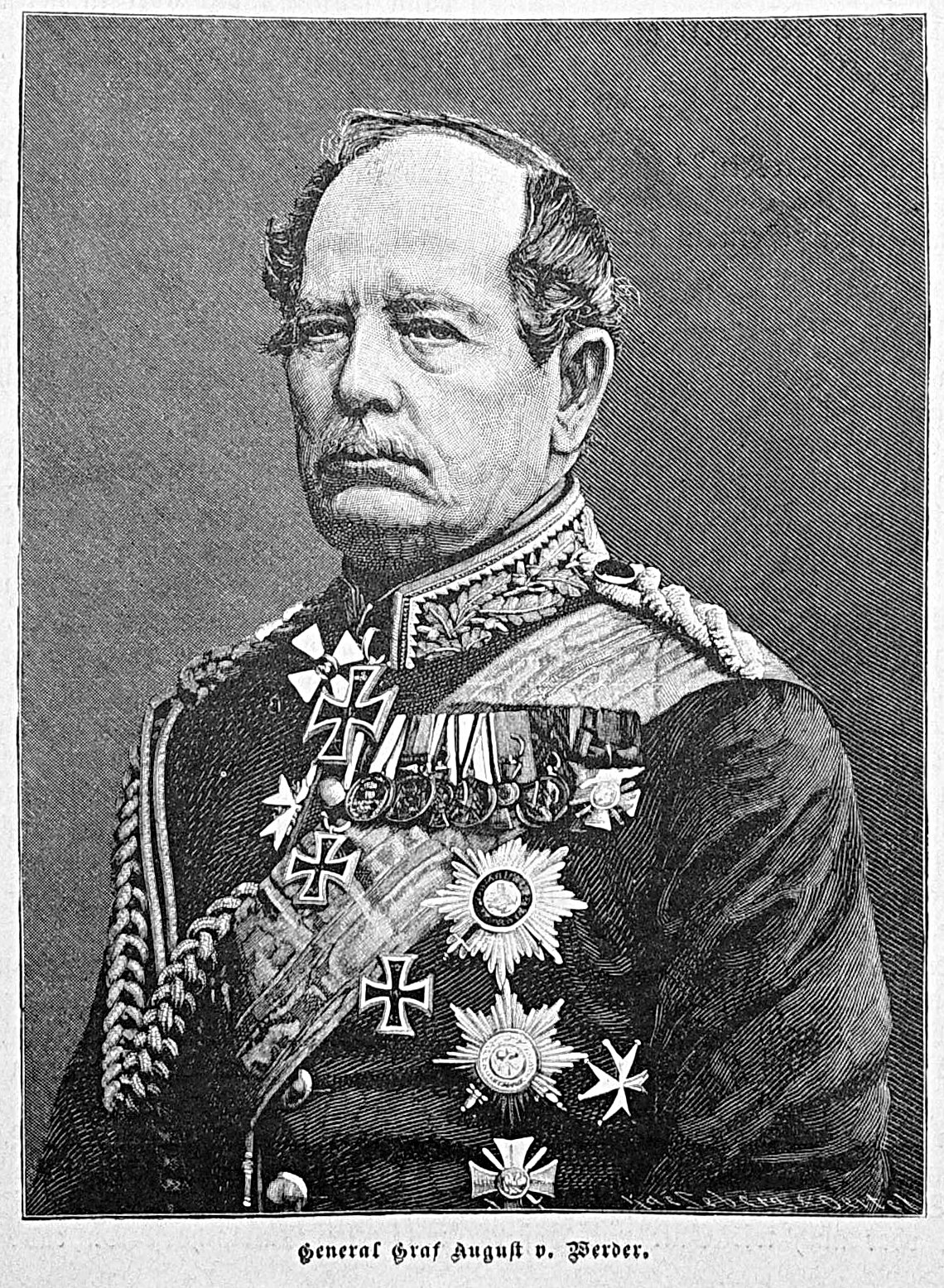
General August Graf von Werder wearing the 1870 Grand Cross.

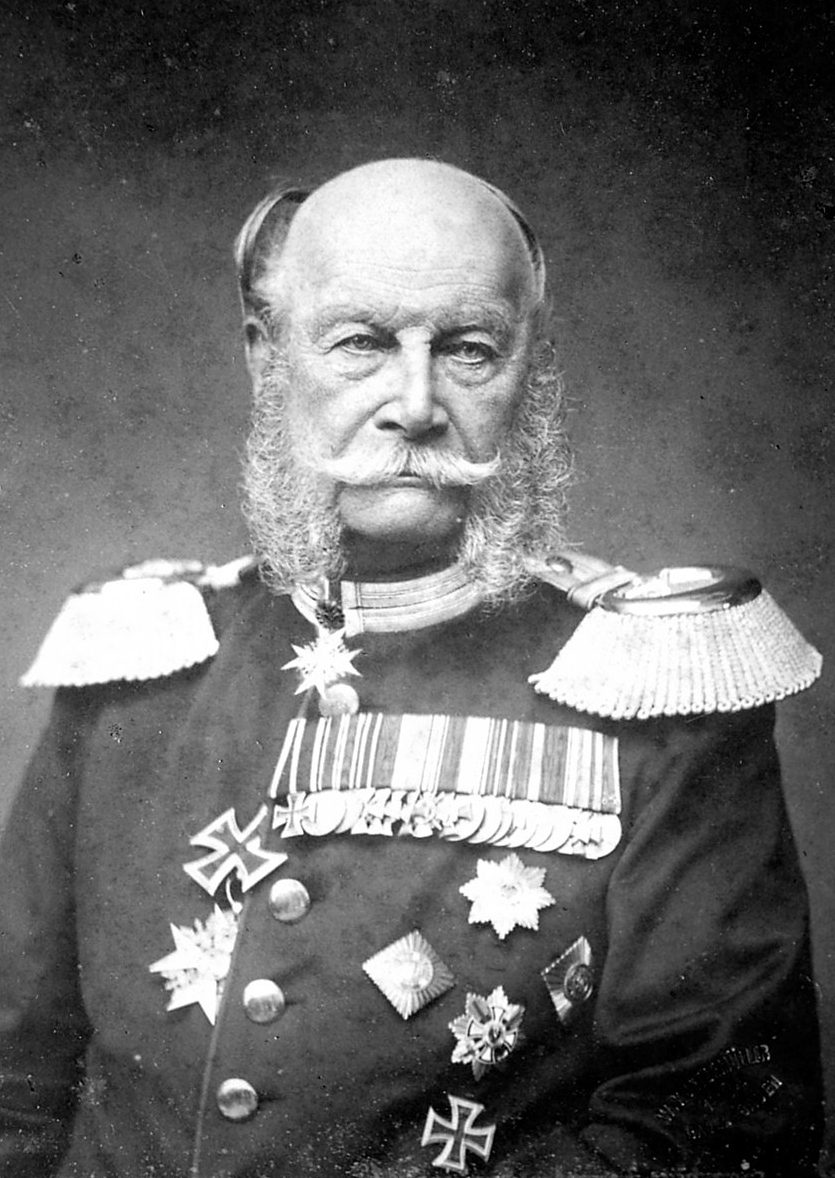
King Wilhelm I of Prussia (later German Emperor) wearing the 1870 Grand Cross.

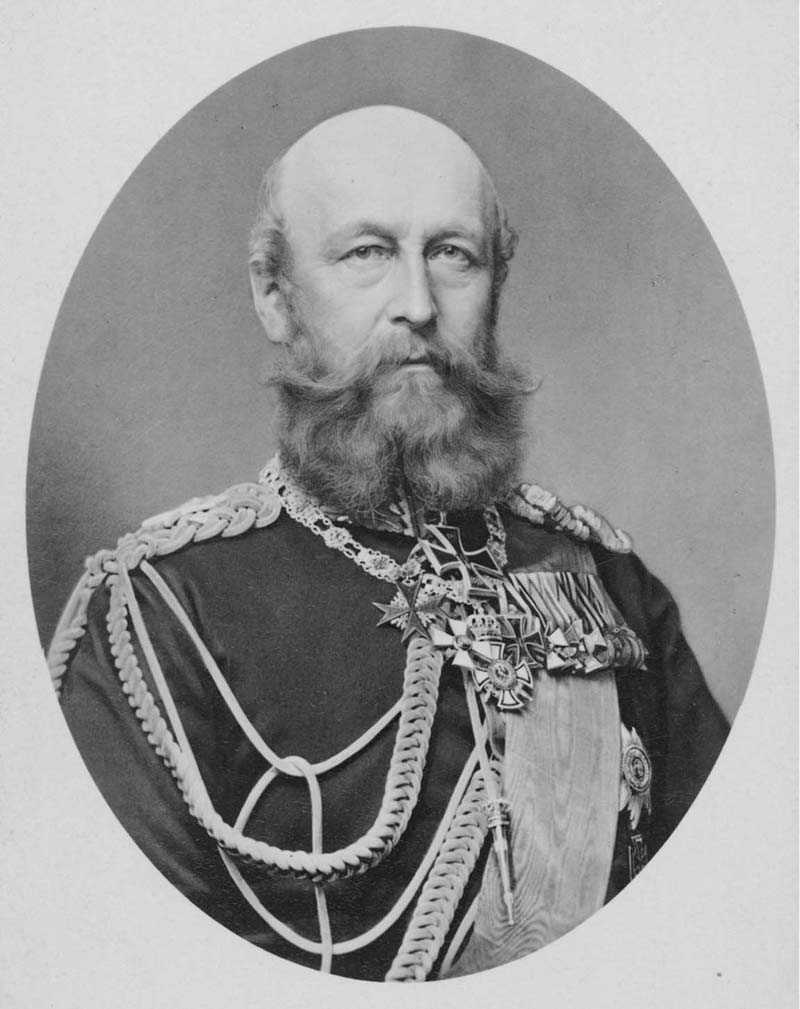
Grand Duke Friedrich Franz II of Mecklenburg-Schwerin wearing the 1870 Grand Cross.

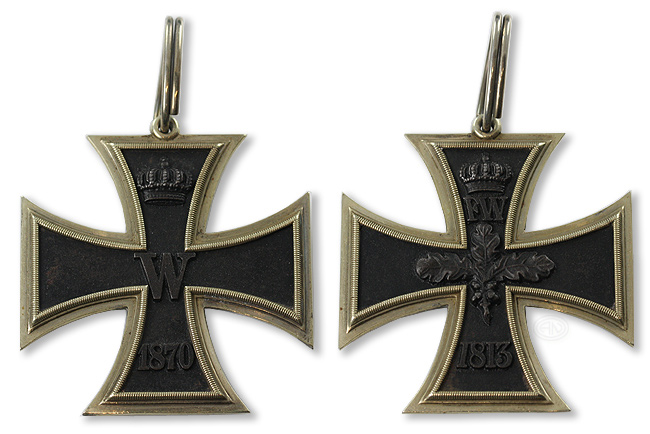
1870 Grand Cross of the Iron Cross.

The Iron Cross was renewed on 19 July 1870, for the Franco-Prussian War. Nine men received the 1870 Grand Cross of the Iron Cross for service during that war. Seven Grand Crosses were awarded on 22 March 1871, to:

- Albert, Crown Prince of Saxony
- August Karl von Goeben
- Edwin Freiherr von Manteuffel
- Helmuth Graf von Moltke the Elder
- Prince Frederick Charles of Prussia
- Crown Prince Friedrich Wilhelm of Prussia (later Kaiser Friedrich III)
- August Graf von Werder

Kaiser Wilhelm I received the Grand Cross on 16 June 1871, and Friedrich Franz II, Grand Duke of Mecklenburg-Schwerin, received it on 4 December 1871. The Kaiser was supreme commander of the Prussian Army, and Moltke was Chief of the General Staff. The others were senior combat commanders of the Prussian Army (Crown Prince Albert initially commanded the Saxon Army as a corps under a Prussian field army, but later took command of a combined Prussian/Saxon field army).

== 1914 Grand Cross ==
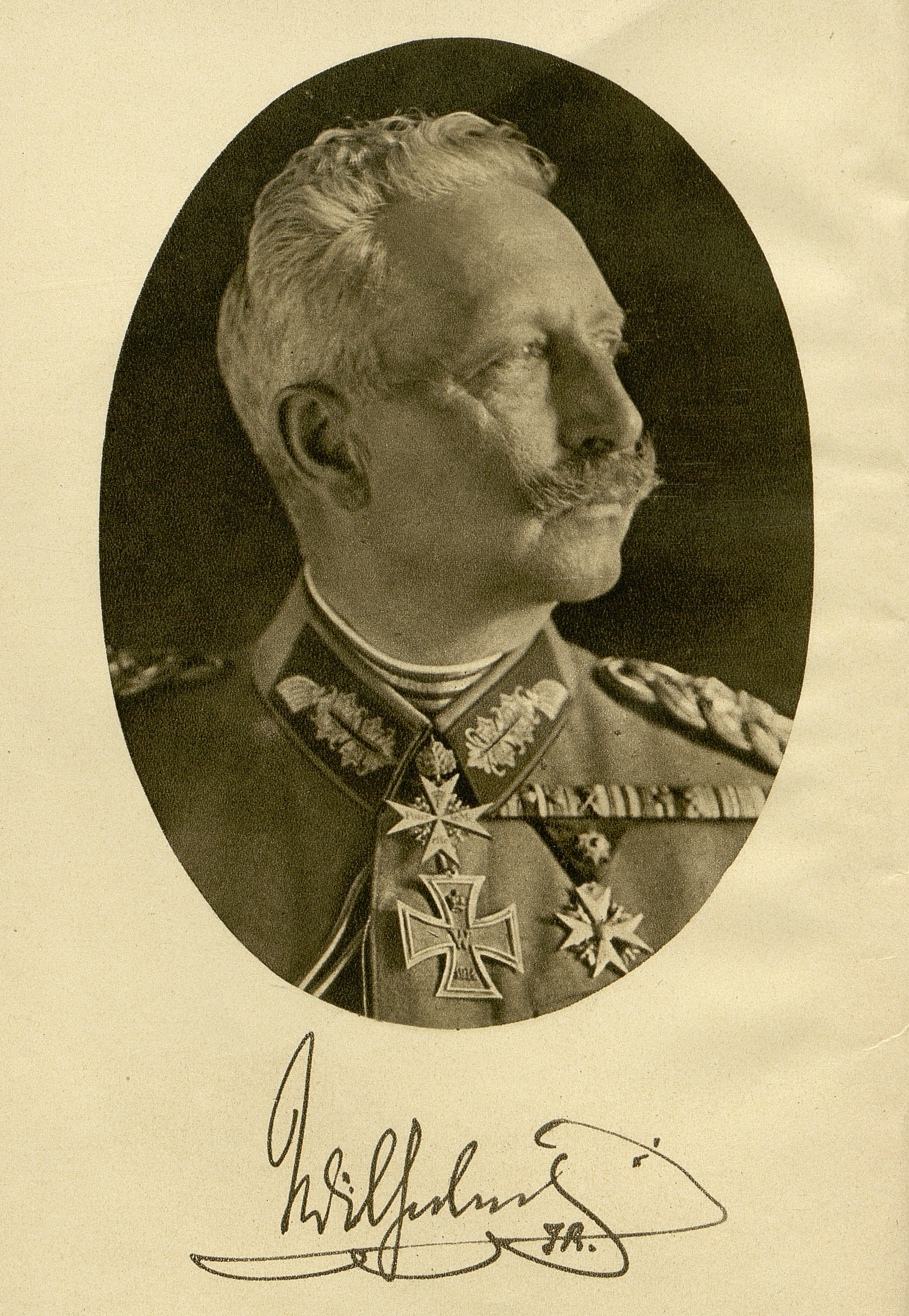
Wilhelm II, German Emperor wearing the 1914 Grand Cross of the Iron Cross.

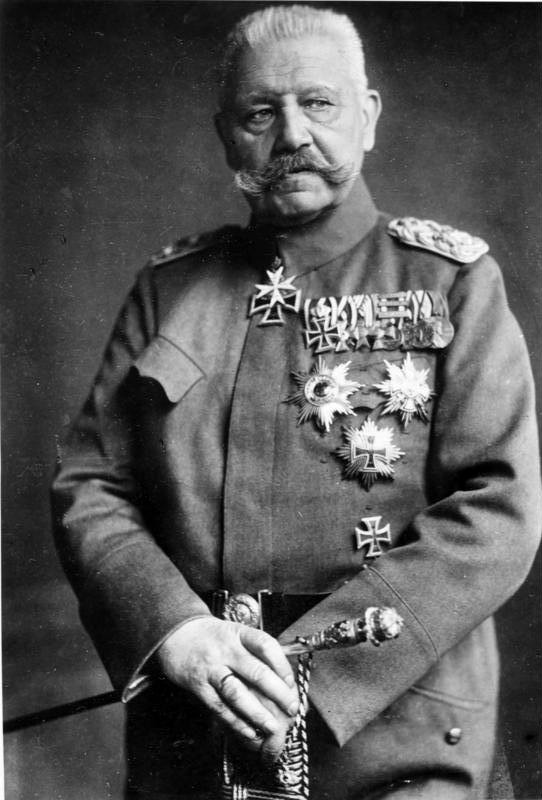
Generalfeldmarschall Paul von Hindenburg wearing the 1914 Grand Cross of the Iron Cross and the Star to the Grand Cross (Hindenburgstern).

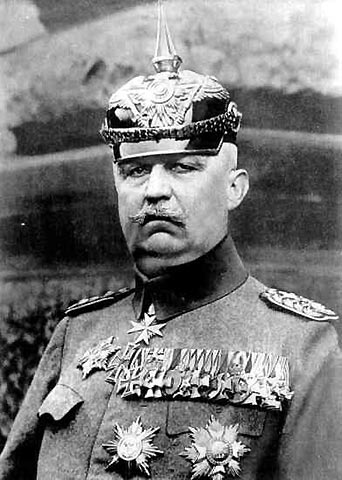
General Erich Ludendorff wearing the 1914 Grand Cross.

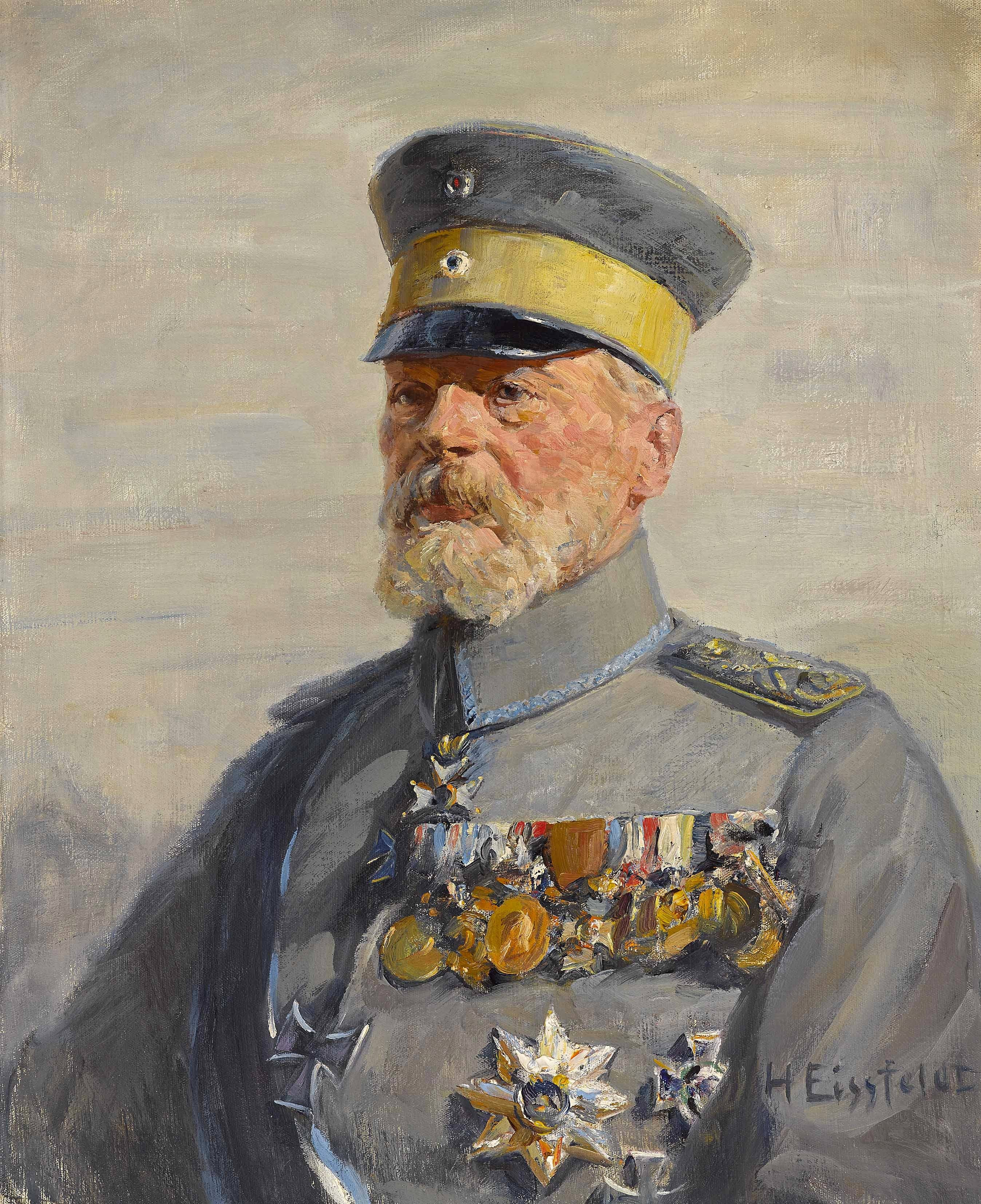
Prince Leopold of Bavaria in a painting wearing the 1914 Grand Cross.

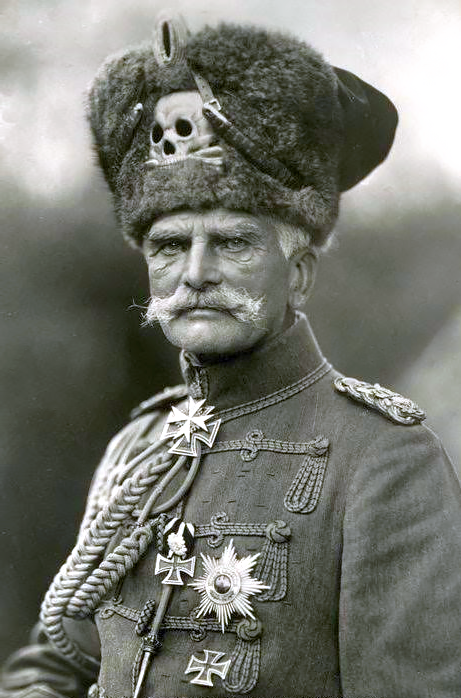
Generalfeldmarschall August von Mackensen wearing the 1914 Grand Cross.

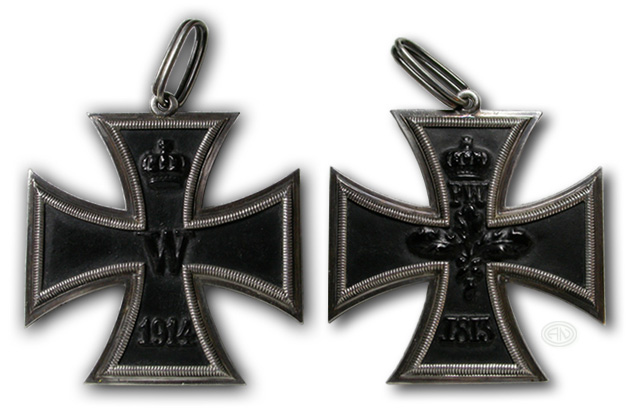
1914 Grand Cross of the Iron Cross.

The Iron Cross was renewed again on 5 August 1914. There were five recipients of the 1914 Grand Cross in the First World War:

- Kaiser Wilhelm II
- Paul von Hindenburg, later also awarded the Star of the Grand Cross of the Iron Cross
- Erich Ludendorff
- Prince Leopold of Bavaria
- August von Mackensen

== 1939 Grand Cross ==
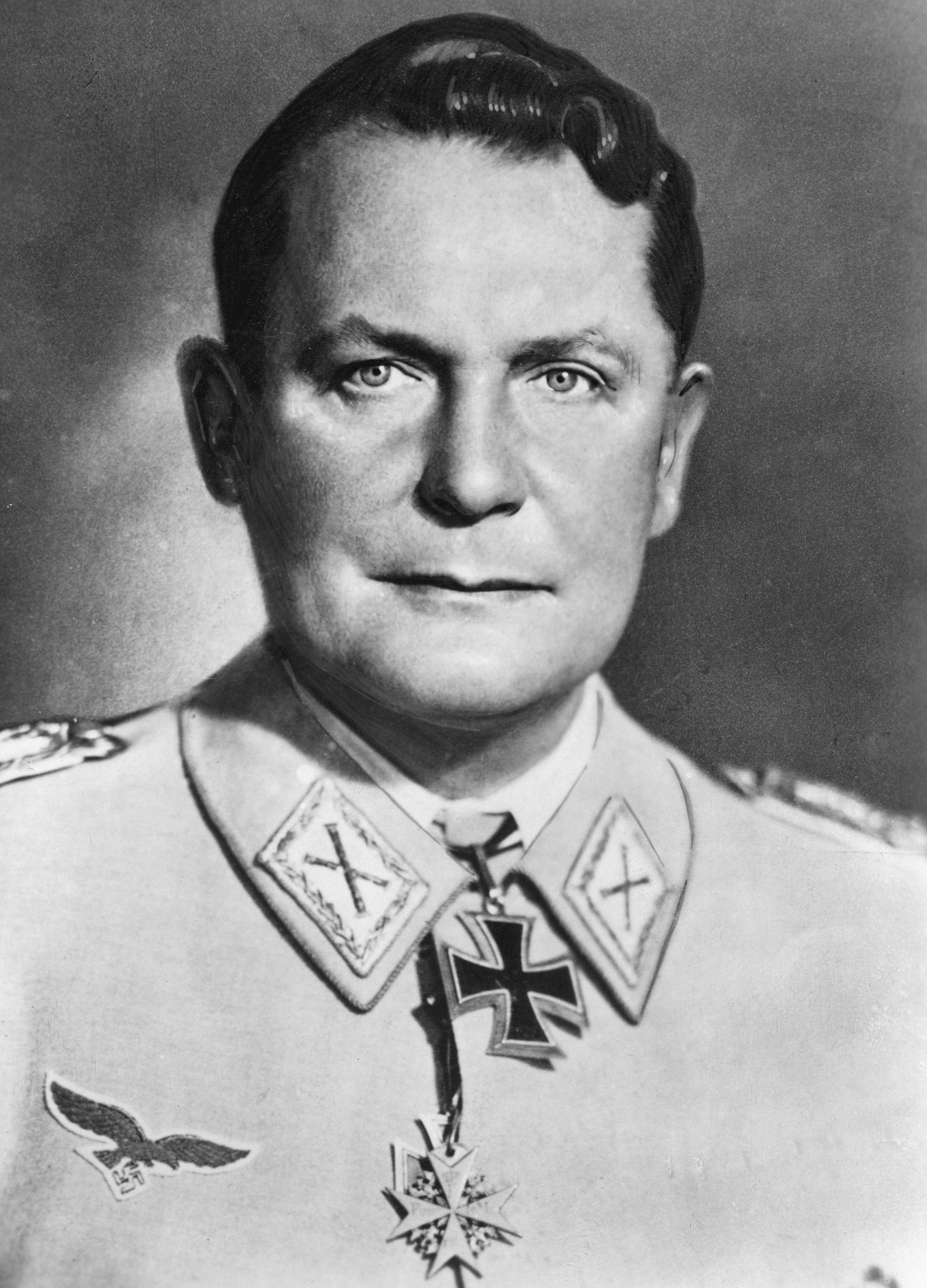
Reichsmarschall Hermann Göring wearing the 1939 Grand Cross and below it his Pour le Mérite.

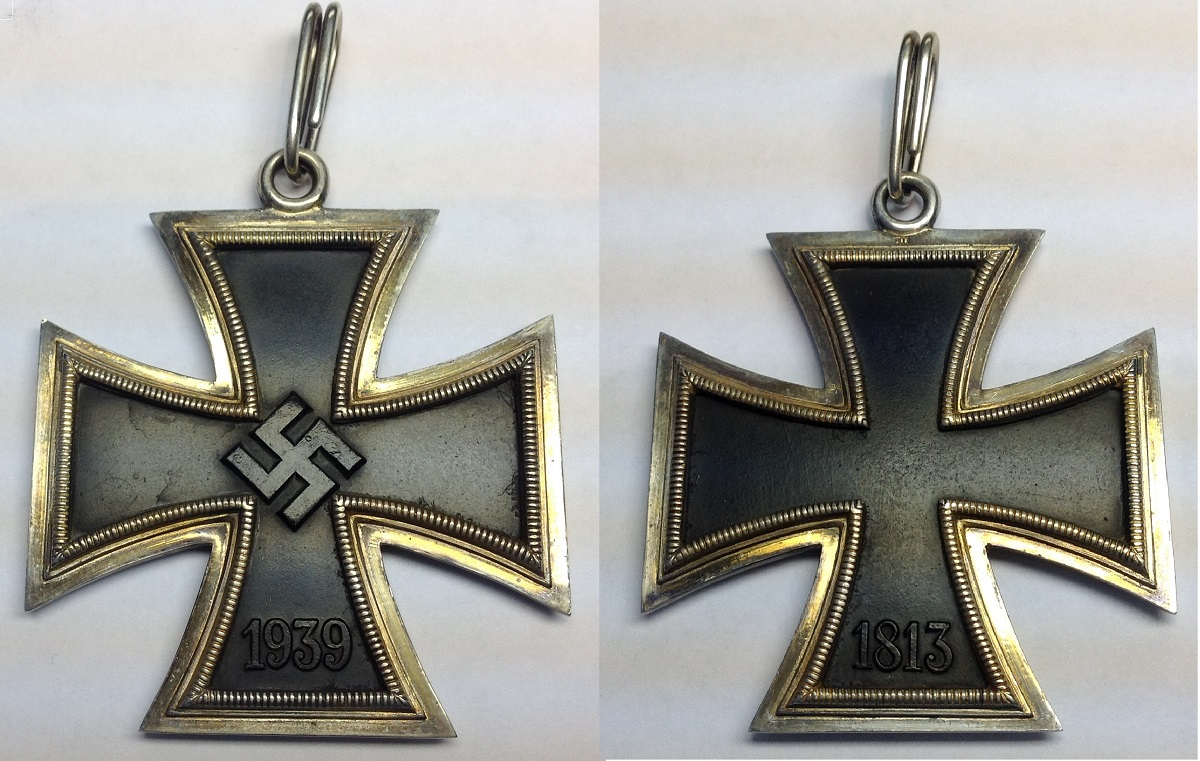
1939 Grand Cross by S&L.

Adolf Hitler reinstituted the Iron Cross as a German decoration in September 1939, with the Grand Cross again the highest grade (above the various classes of the Knight's Cross).

Reichsmarschall Hermann Göring became the only recipient of the Grand Cross of the Iron Cross during World War II when it was awarded to him at the Field Marshal Ceremony on 19 July 1940 in his role as the Supreme Commander of the Luftwaffe for leading them to victory in the French campaign.

A World War II version of the higher Star of the Grand Cross of the Iron Cross was devised, but never formally instituted or awarded. Following the Allied victory in May 1945, the United States Army seized the only known prototype, which is now a part of the collection of the Museum of the United States Military Academy (USMA) in West Point, New York.

== Literature ==
- Angolia, John R. (1976). For Führer and Fatherland: Military Awards of the Third Reich. R. James Bender Publishing. ISBN 0-912138-14-9.
- Littlejohn, David; Dodkins, Colonel C. M. (1968). Orders, Decorations, Medals and Badges of the Third Reich. R. James Bender Publishing, California. ISBN 978-0854200801.
