= Battle of Luckau =

1813 battle during the War of the Sixth Coalition

- Part of the German campaign of the Sixth Coalition
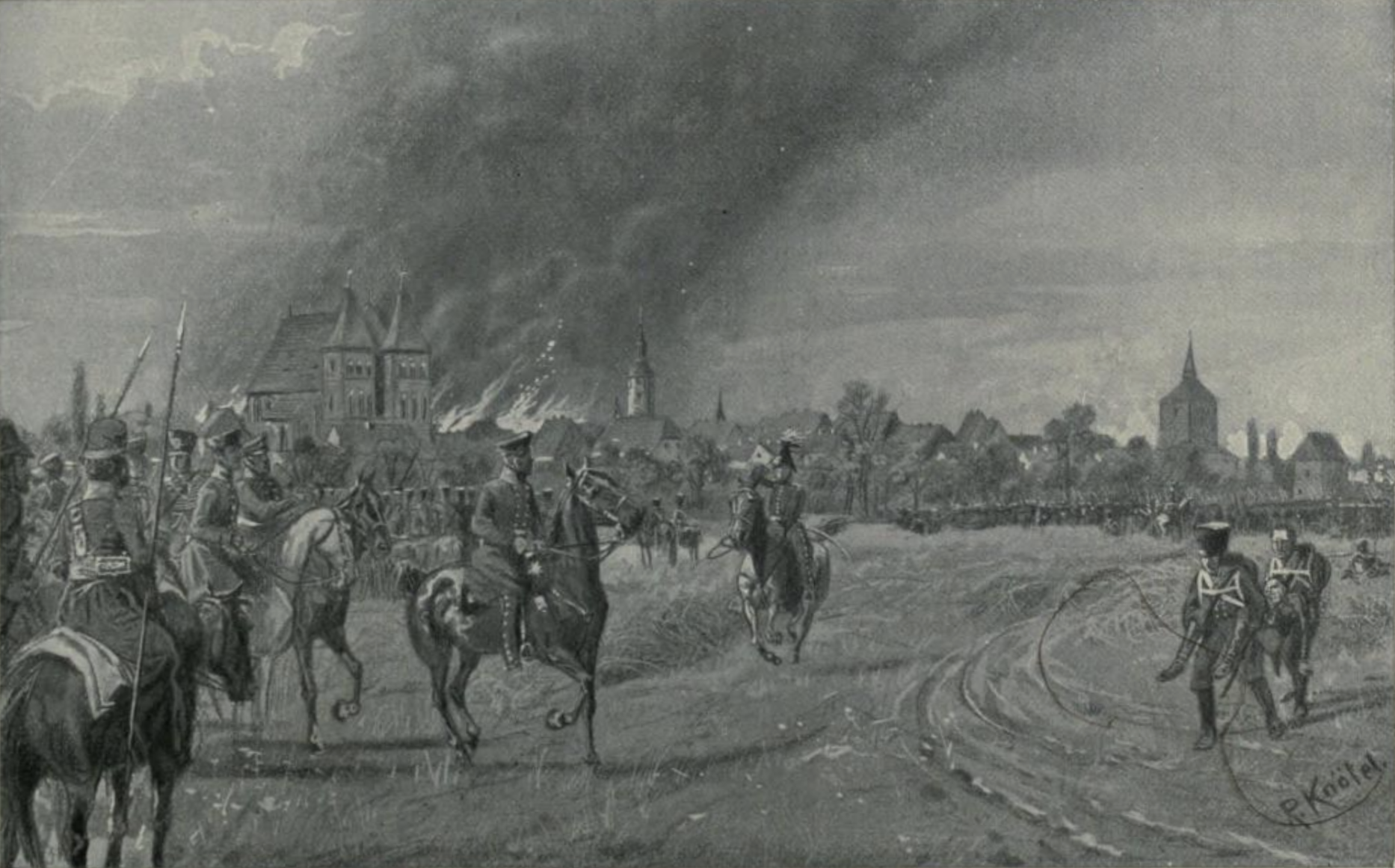
- Battle of Luckau on 4 June 1813 (Richard Knötel, c. 1901)
Date	4 June 1813
Location	Luckau, Brandenburg 51°51′00″N 13°43′00″E
Result	Coalition victory

Belligerents
France	Prussia; Russia

Commanders and leaders
(First French Empire) Nicolas Oudinot	(Kingdom of Prussia) Friedrich Wilhelm von Bülow

Strength
18,000	21,400

Casualties and losses
2,200 killed, wounded or captured	800 killed or wounded
- Location within Europe

War of the Sixth Coalition:
German campaign
current battle
Napoleon in command
Napoleon not in command

The Battle of Luckau was fought at Luckau in Brandenburg on 4 June 1813 during the War of the Sixth Coalition. Prussian and Russian forces under General Friedrich Wilhelm von Bülow defeated part of a French-Allied corps under Marshal Nicolas Oudinot.

== Background ==
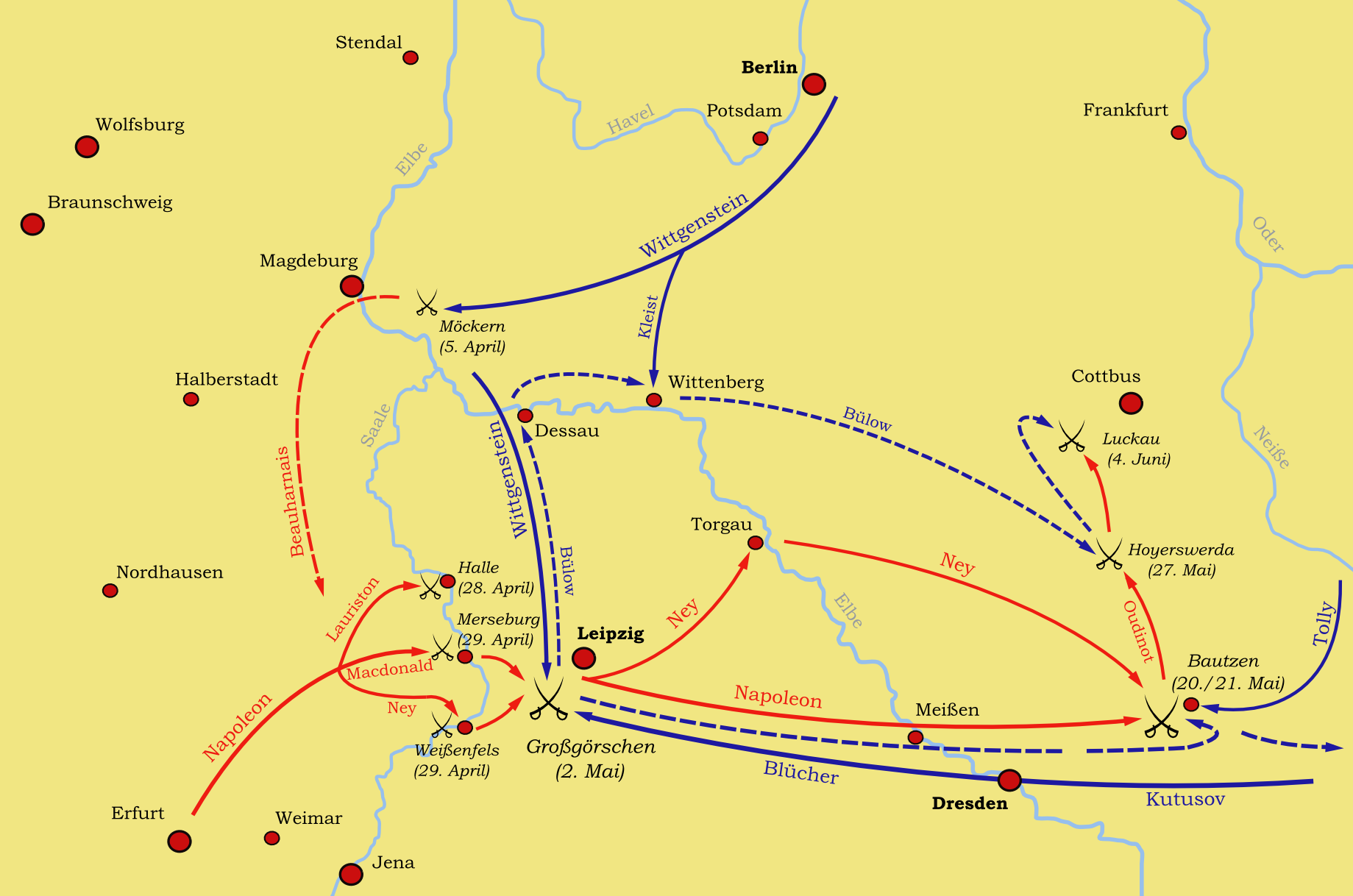
German map of the Spring-Campaign 1813 in Germany.

After the French victory over the coalition armies at Bautzen on 21 May, Napoleon sent the XII Corps under the command of Oudinot north toward Berlin to protect against the activities of Bülow. On 27 May, after the two forces clashed along the Black Elster River at Hoyerswerda, Bülow's corps withdrew and scattered northwest to Jüterbog and north to the vicinity of Cottbus. On 3 June, Bülow moved his forces from Cottbus northwest to Luckau in an attempt to link-up with his forces at Jüterbog. When Oudinot discovered that Bülow had moved to Luckau, he went to intercept.

== Battle ==
Oudinot commanded the XII Corps and brought only General of Division Michel Marie Pacthod's 13th Division into action. This unit consisted of two brigades under Generals of Brigade Bernard Pourailly and Antoine Gruyer. Pourailly led the 7th Battalion of the 6th Line Infantry Regiment, the 3rd and 4th Battalions of the 7th Line, the 4th Battalion of the 1st Light, and the 4th Battalion of the 10th Line. Gruyer directed the 2nd, 3rd and 4th Battalions of the 101st Line Infantry Regiment, and the 1st and 2nd Battalions of the 1st Neapolitan Light Infantry Regiment. Also engaged in the fight were two foot artillery batteries and two squadrons each of the Bavarian and Hesse-Darmstadt Chevau-léger Regiments.

Bülow's force consisted of 16 and a half battalions, 10 squadrons, 1 Cossack Pulk, and 58 guns. His 15,800 men included a Russian brigade led by General-major Harpe and a Prussian brigade commanded by Prince Ludwig von Hesse-Homburg.

Oudinot's vanguard reached Luckau at 9 a.m. on 4 June and immediately attacked. The French initially forced the allies back into the walled portion of the town.

The French then attempted to break through the walls, but were unsuccessful. Bülow took advantage of the situation; he reinforced his cavalry and attacked the French flanks. After a fight that lasted throughout the afternoon, Oudinot withdrew 40 kilometres (25 mi) southwest to Übigau near Dresden.

The Russians and Prussians lost about 800 killed and wounded in the action. The French and their allies suffered 1,500 killed and wounded. In addition, Bülow's soldiers captured 700 men, one cannon, and two ammunition wagons.

== Aftermath ==
On 4 June 1813, both sides had agreed to the seven-week Truce of Pläswitz. In August, Napoleon's order to take the Prussian capital of Berlin led to the Battle of Großbeeren.

== Citations ==
Preceded by Siege of Tarragona (1813)	Napoleonic Wars; Battle of Luckau	Succeeded by Battle of Vitoria
