= Battle of Großbeeren =

1813 battle during the War of the Sixth Coalition

- Part of the German campaign of the Sixth Coalition
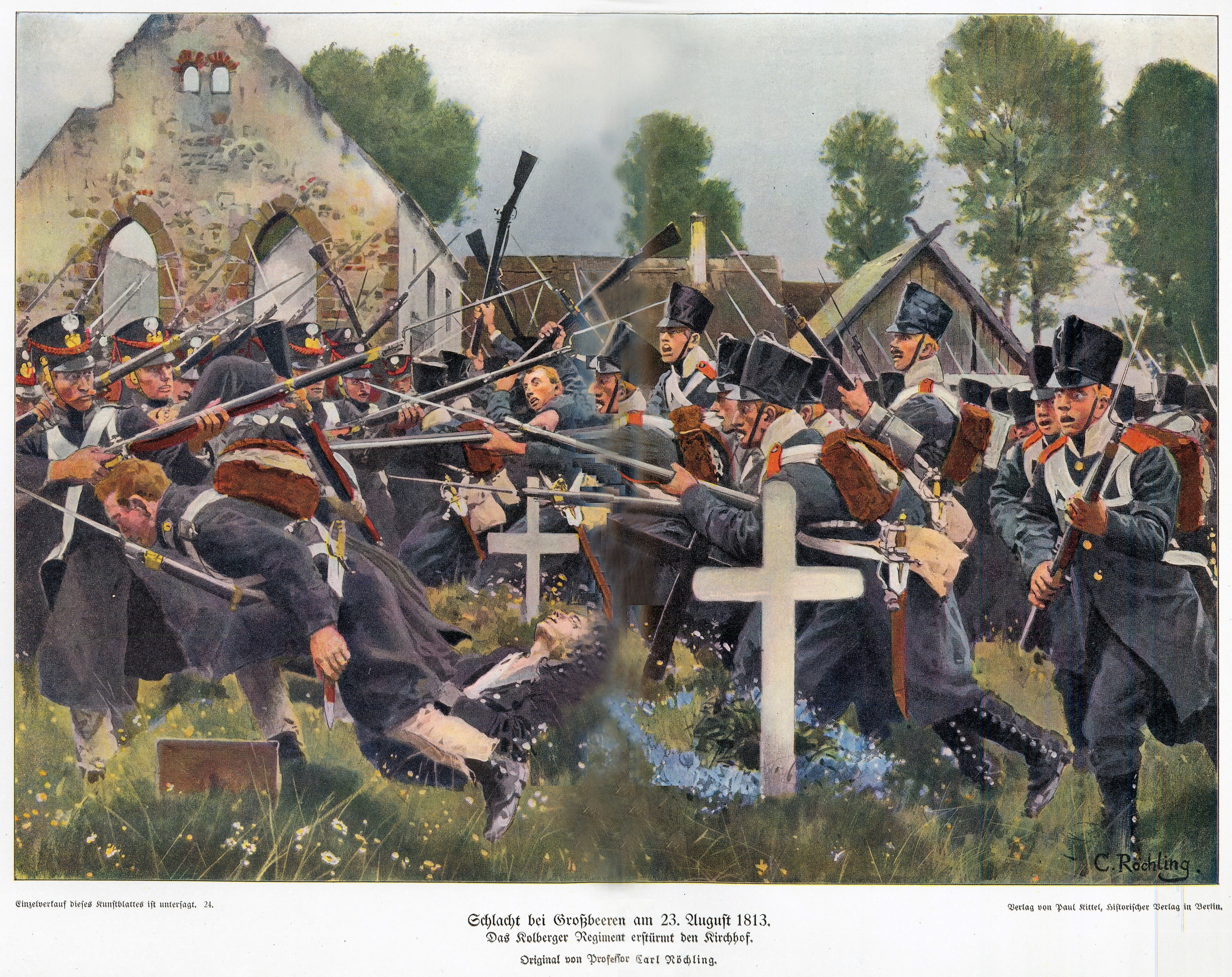
- Rain having rendered small arms fire impossible, Saxon infantry (left) use musket butts and bayonets to defend a churchyard against a Prussian onslaught
Date	23 August 1813
Location	Großbeeren, south of Berlin 52°21′00″N 13°18′00″E
Result	Coalition victory

Belligerents
Prussia; Russia; Sweden	France (Kingdom of Saxony) Saxony

Commanders and leaders
(Sweden) Charles John; (Kingdom of Prussia) Friedrich Wilhelm von Bülow	(First French Empire) Jean Reynier; (First French Empire) Nicolas Oudinot

Units involved
III Corps	VII Corps

Strength
32,000; 82 guns	18,000; 68 guns

Casualties and losses
500 dead 1,000 wounded 300 missing or captured 6 guns	1,700 dead or wounded 1,500 missing or captured Including: • (Kingdom of Saxony) 2,100 • (First French Empire) 1,100 14 guns 58 ammunition wagons
- Location within Europe

War of the Sixth Coalition:
German campaign
current battle
Napoleon in command
Napoleon not in command

The Battle of Großbeeren occurred on 23 August 1813 in neighboring Blankenfelde and Sputendorf between the Prussian III Corps under Friedrich von Bülow and the Franco-Saxon VII Corps under Jean Reynier. Napoleon had hoped to drive the Prussians out of the Sixth Coalition by capturing their capital, but the swamps south of Berlin combined with rain and marshal Nicolas Oudinot's ill health all contributed to the French defeat.

== Prelude ==
Following the Battle of Bautzen, in May 1813, during the War of the Sixth Coalition, both sides agreed to a seven-week truce to plan and better prepare. When the campaign resumed, in August, Napoleon ordered an offensive drive to take the Prussian capital of Berlin. With its capture, he hoped to knock the Prussians out of the war. Meanwhile, he kept the bulk of his army on the strategic defensive, to deal with any potential moves by the large Austrian army, which had now gathered in southeastern Germany. For this task, he chose one of his bravest and best commanders, Marshal Nicolas Oudinot, to lead the offensive. Oudinot tried to turn down this honor due to his poor health. He had been wounded on several occasions during the previous year's disastrous campaign in Russia, and had not yet fully recovered. But the emperor insisted, so Oudinot with three corps of about 70,000 men advanced on Berlin.

Unknown to both Napoleon and Oudinot at the time, this strategy played right into the Coalition's hands. In accordance with the Trachenberg Plan (the Allied plan for the campaign formulated during the truce), in large part created by Bernadotte, the commander of the Allied Army of the North himself, they would avoid any large, main engagement with Napoleon himself until after they had gathered overwhelming strength and weakened the emperor by defeating his marshals in separate, smaller battles.

Initially, Bernadotte felt that Berlin was not defensible against a large French attack due to the lack of natural barriers to the south of the city and the danger to his line of retreat to Swedish Pomerania in the event Napoleon made the attack against Berlin his main effort. However, for political reasons, and the Prussian insistence that they would defend Berlin by themselves if necessary, the Crown Prince relented and began planning for the defense of the city. Bernadotte made use of the disposition of local road networks and marshy terrain and placed his various corps in position to hold an enemy advance along the few North-South roads long enough for the rest of the Army of the North to take advantage of a larger number of East-West roads, and the open terrain, to arrive.

From its start the French offensive was plagued by misfortune. On the same day as the advance began, 19 August, heavy rain storms broke out turning the roads into muddy quagmires and making it nearly impossible to move the artillery. Further hindering the advance, the area south of Berlin was crisscrossed with small lakes and swamps. In the best of weather there were only a couple of roads by which to approach the city from the south. But rain turned many of the Prussian defensive positions into fortified islands. Oudinot was forced to advance his Corps along three separate roads, with little communication between them.

General Bertrand's IV Corps of 13,000 and 32 cannons to the right, on the left General Guilleminot's XII Corps of 20,000, mainly inexperienced recent recruits, (nicknamed Marie-Louises). In the centre was the main column of General Jean Reynier's VII Corps of 27,000 largely French allied Saxon troops. Oudinot did not expect any serious opposition and a lack of cavalry kept him unaware of the position of the enemy.

== Battle ==
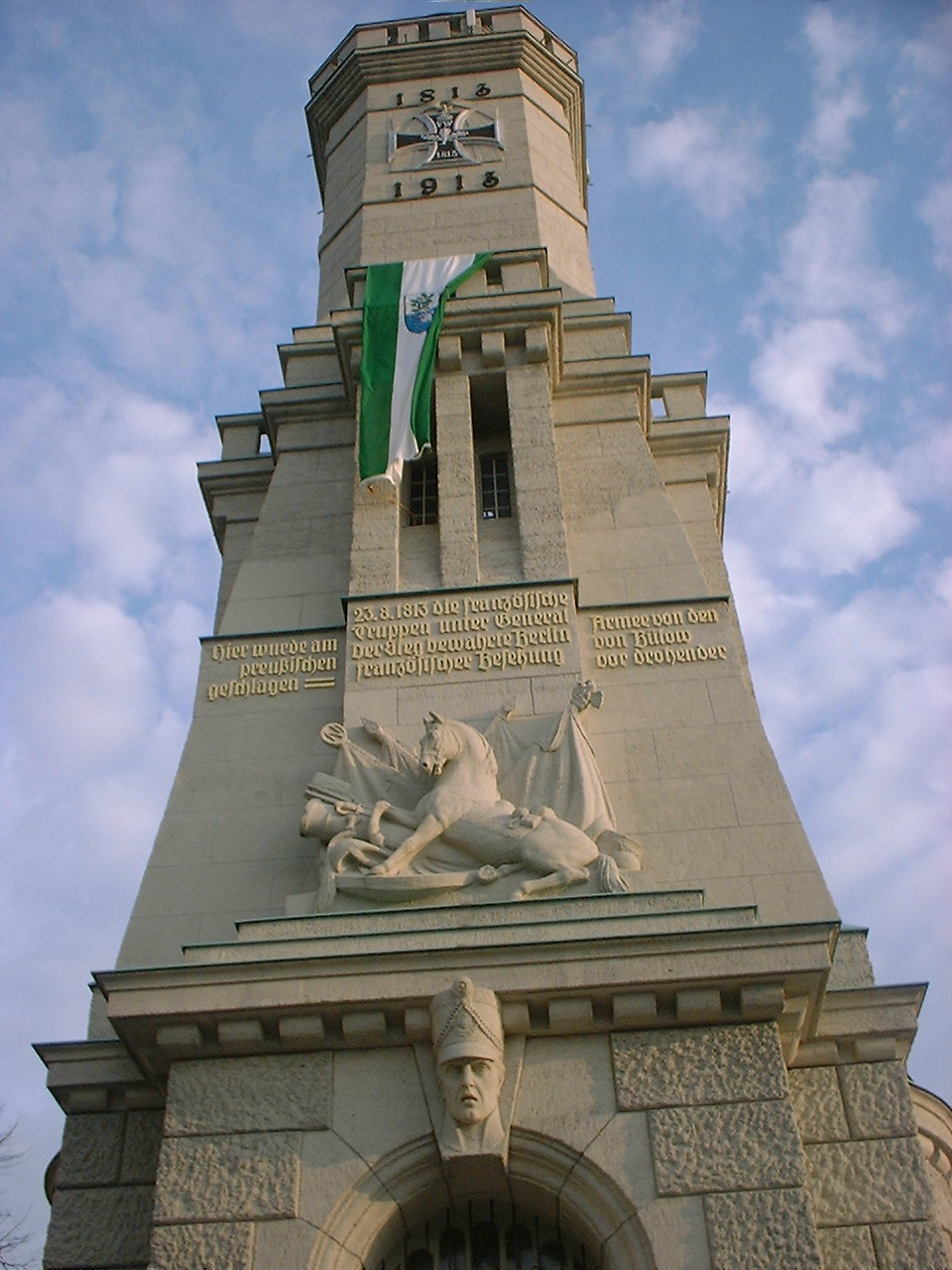
Memorial tower in Großbeeren

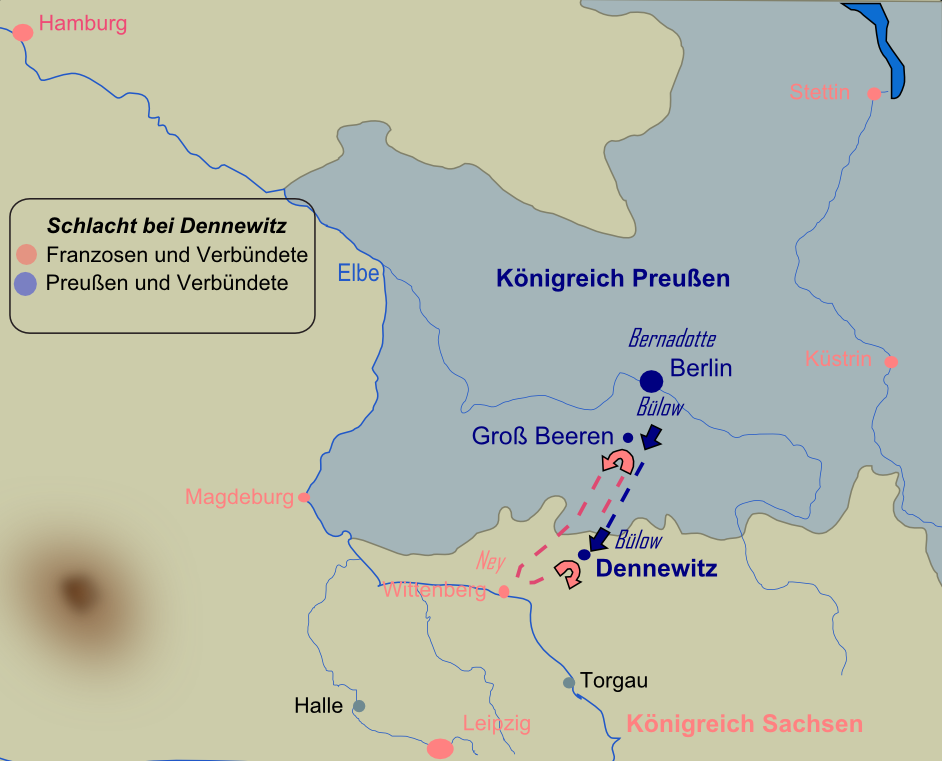
French March on Berlin (red)

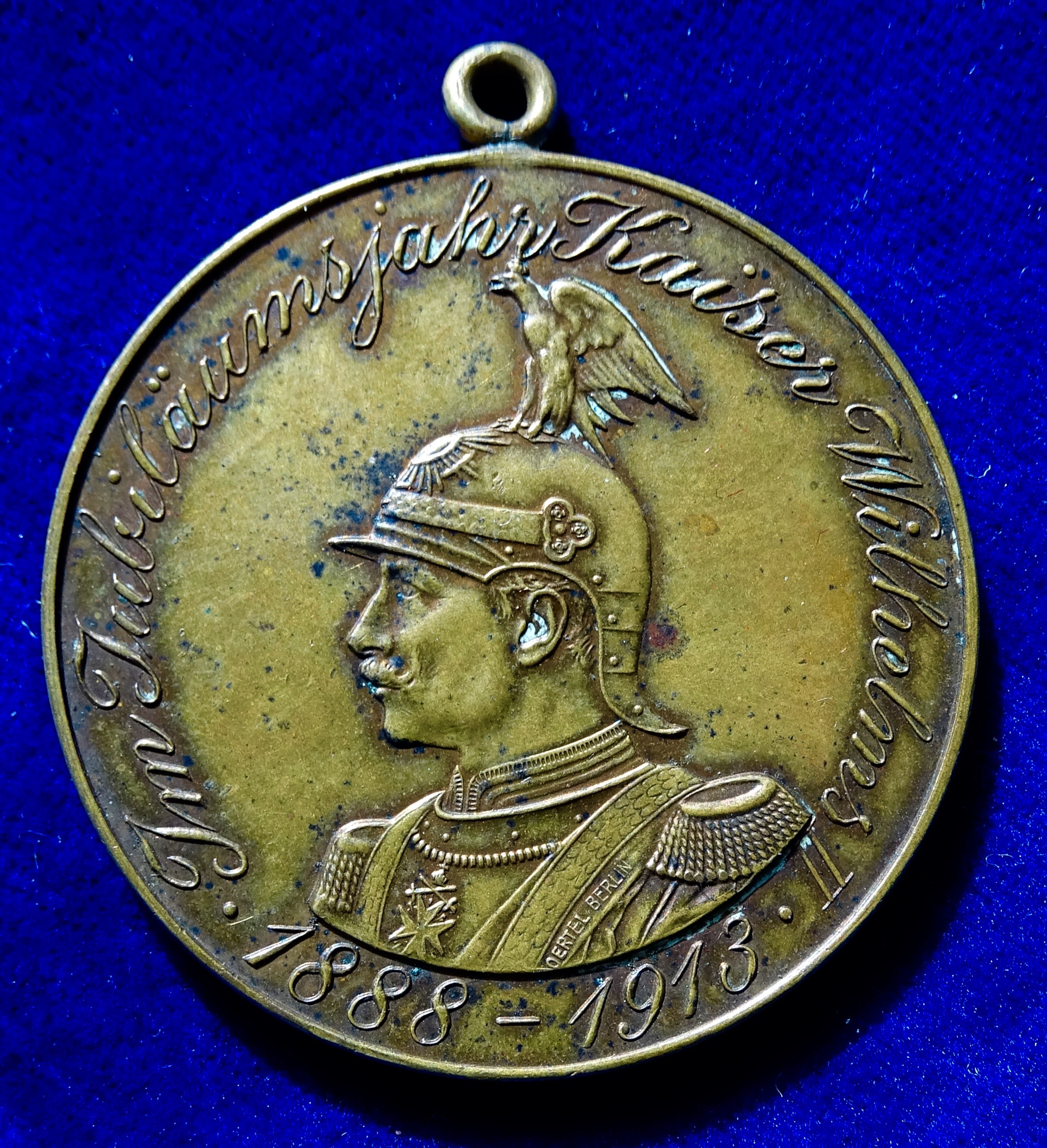
Medal for the opening on 23 August 1913 of the memorial tower at Großbeeren, commemorating the 100th anniversary of the battle, obverse

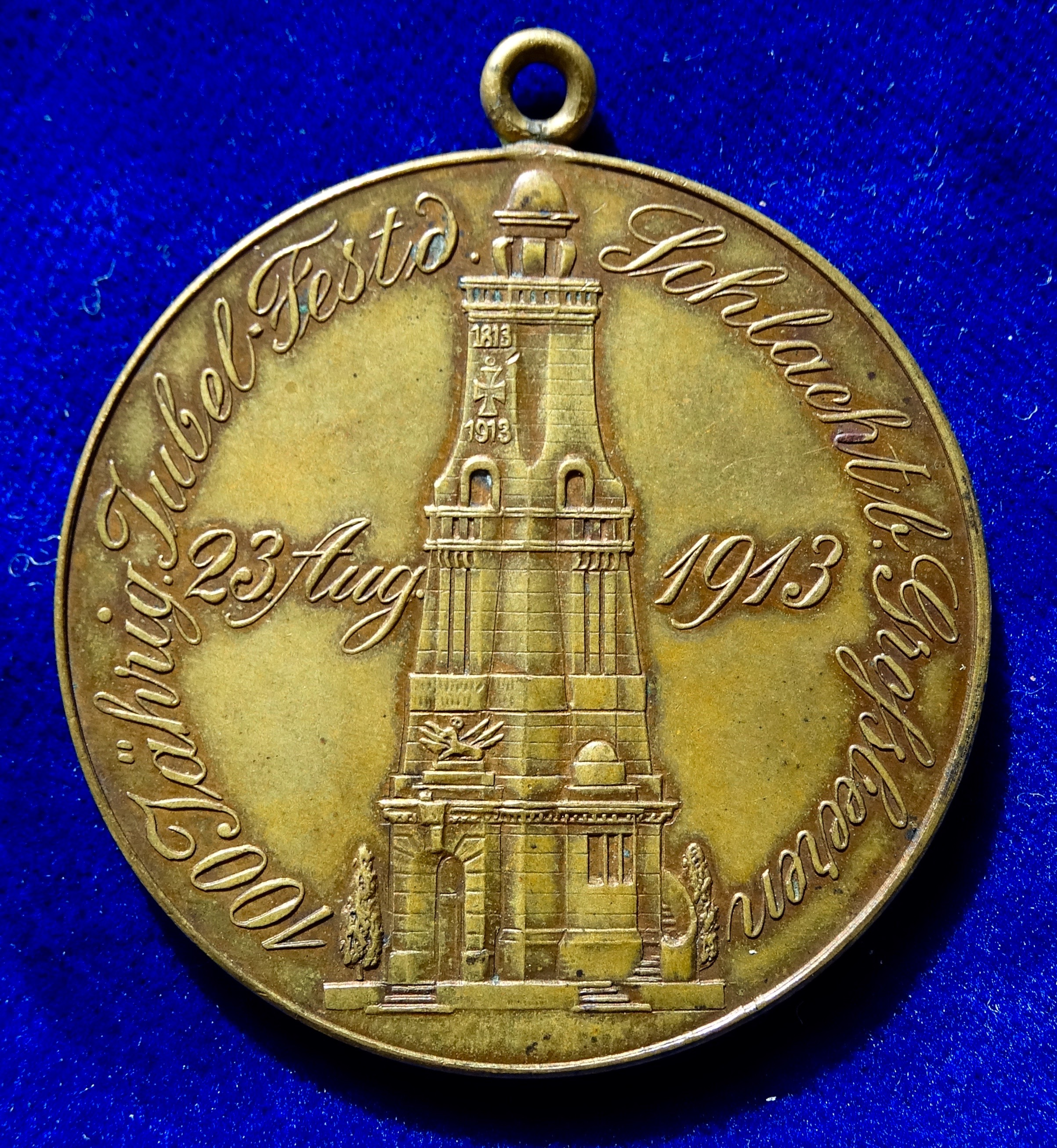
Medal for the opening on 23 August 1913 of the memorial tower at Großbeeren, commemorating the 100th anniversary of the battle, reverse.

Berlin was defended by the Army of the North, commanded by Crown Prince Charles John of Sweden, formerly French Marshal Bernadotte. When Reynier's corps reached Großbeeren, he encountered the bulk of Prince Charles' army drawn up for battle. Acting without orders or support, he attacked Friedrich von Bülow's corps, which had just been reinforced by the Swedes to 38,000 strong, and was repulsed with heavy casualties. Oudinot, unable to concentrate his army, arrived late in the day just as Reynier's Saxons had begun to waver after that general failed to rally them for another assault. Von Bülow's Corps suffered light casualties, had fought extremely well, and petitioned to set out on an immediate pursuit of the unorganized French but was reined in by Charles John.

== Aftermath ==
=== Trachenberg Plan ===
The Trachenberg Plan was a campaign strategy created by the Allies during the Truce of Pläswitz. The plan advocated avoiding direct engagement with Napoleon in battle.

On 23 August 1813, the Battle of Großbeeren was a Coalition victory against a French Army without Napoleon.

On 26 August 1813, the Battle of the Katzbach was a Russo–Prussian victory against a French Army without Napoleon.

On 26–27 August 1813, the Battle of Dresden was a victory of a French Army led by Napoleon.

=== Fight for Berlin ===
Realising the advance had been checked, and believing his army was in an exposed position, Oudinot ordered the retreat to Jüterbog after sustaining heavy losses. Reynier lost 20 Saxon officers and 1,918 enlisted men, 1,138 French and 14 guns and 52 full ammunition carts.

Bernadotte did not order a pursuit, despite the extreme vulnerability of the demoralized French and the vigorous protests of his Prussian generals. Bülow and Tauentzien argued that the French forces under Oudinot could be utterly destroyed by a rapid pursuit south, and protested Bernadotte's idleness to the senior Prussian commander in the field, Field Marshal Blücher and the King of Prussia. However, Bernadotte feared that moving away from Berlin to chase the French might be falling right into Napoleon's hands as it would mean isolating his Army, endangering his lines of communication by leaving Marshal Davout and his force of 35,000 in Hamburg in his rear, and drawing closer to the French main body thus allowing Napoleon to use interior lines to attack him before any Allied army could intervene. As a consequence, and to the extreme displeasure of the Prussians, the Allied Army of the North remained in its favorable defensive position near Berlin waiting to receive another French attack.

The defeat at Großbeeren, combined with continued ill health, had shaken Oudinot's confidence, and he continued the general retreat to Wittenberg. Napoleon was furious with Oudinot, not so much for his defeat, but for his withdrawal to Wittenberg instead of back to Luckau. He fumed, "It is truly difficult to have fewer brains than the Duke of Reggio!" Napoleon then appointed Marshal Michel Ney to lead a second drive on Berlin with the same three, now reduced and demoralized, corps and the ailing Oudinot as Ney's subordinate. The result would be the Battle of Dennewitz on 6 September 1813.

== Literary reference ==
In 1833 Theodor Fontane – then a fourteen-year-old boy – visited the site of the Battle of Großbeeren and was deeply impressed, later writing a school essay about this battle – the first work known to have been penned by a man who would become a major German writer. Fontane recounted this reminiscence in a much later essay, written in his old age (1894). He mentioned also that his mother – at the time a young Berlin woman – had in the aftermath of the battle tended wounded soldiers, both German and French. Being of a Huguenot family who still spoke French among themselves, she was able to speak to dying French soldiers in their own language.

== Notes ==
Preceded by Battle of Sorauren	Napoleonic Wars; Battle of Großbeeren	Succeeded by Battle of the Katzbach
