= XII Corps (Grande Armée) =

- Active: 1813
- Country: First French Empire
- Branch: French Imperial Army
- Size: Corps
- Engagements: War of the Sixth Coalition; Battle of Lützen; Battle of Bautzen; Battle of Luckau; Battle of Großbeeren; Battle of Dennewitz

Commanders
- Notable commanders: Nicolas Oudinot

The XII Corps of the Grande Armée was a short-lived French military unit that existed during the Napoleonic Wars. The corps was formed in the spring of 1813 and Marshal Nicolas Oudinot was appointed as its commander. The formation included one Bavarian and two French infantry divisions. During the German campaign, the XII Corps was engaged at Lützen, Bautzen, and Luckau. After the summer 1813 armistice, the corps fought at Großbeeren and Dennewitz. After the latter action, Emperor Napoleon I dissolved the XII Corps and assigned its units to other formations. Oudinot found employment as a commander of two divisions of the Young Guard.

== Order of battle ==
=== Bautzen, 1813 ===
XII Corps: Marshal Nicolas Oudinot

- 13th French Division: General of Division Michel-Marie Pacthod
  - Brigade: General of Brigade Bernard Pourailly
    - 1st Light Infantry Regiment (4th Battalion)
    - 7th Line Infantry Regiment (3rd and 4th Battalions)
    - 10th Line Infantry Regiment (4th Battalion)
    - 42nd Line Infantry Regiment (4th Battalion)
  - Brigade: General of Brigade Antoine Gruyer
    - 1st Neapolitan Light Infantry Regiment (2 battalions)
    - 101st Line Infantry Regiment (2nd, 3rd and 4th Battalions)
- 14th French Division: General of Division Guillaume Latrille de Lorencez
  - Brigade: General of Brigade Louis Nicolas Marin Leclerc des Essarts
    - 52nd Line Infantry Regiment (3rd and 4th Battalions)
    - 137th Line Infantry Regiment (4 battalions)
  - Brigade: General of Brigade François Nizard Charles Joseph d'Hénin
    - 156th Line Infantry Regiment (4 battalions)
  - Artillery: 2 foot artillery companies
- 29th Bavarian Division: General-Leutnant Clemens von Raglovich
  - Brigade: General-Major Karl von Beckers
    - 1st Combined Light Infantry Battalion
    - Prinz Karl Line Infantry Regiment Nr. 3 (2nd Battalion)
    - Isenburg Line Infantry Regiment Nr. 4 (2nd Battalion)
    - Herzog Pius Line Infantry Regiment Nr. 8 (2nd Battalion)
    - Line Infantry Regiment Nr. 13 (Reserve Battalion)
  - Brigade: Oberst Nikolaus von Maillot de la Treille
    - 2nd Combined Light Infantry Battalion
    - Preysing Line Infantry Regiment Nr. 5 (2nd Battalion)
    - Line Infantry Regiment Nr. 7 (2nd Battalion)
    - Line Infantry Regiment Nr. 9 (2nd Battalion)
    - Junker Line Infantry Regiment Nr. 10 (2nd Battalion)
  - Divisional artillery and cavalry:
    - 3 foot artillery companies
    - Combined Chevau-léger Regiment (3 squadrons)

Source: Smith, Digby (1998). The Napoleonic Wars Data Book. London: Greenhill. p. 420. ISBN 1-85367-276-9.
