= German campaign of 1813 =

Conflict between France and an alliance

German campaign
- Part of the War of the Sixth Coalition
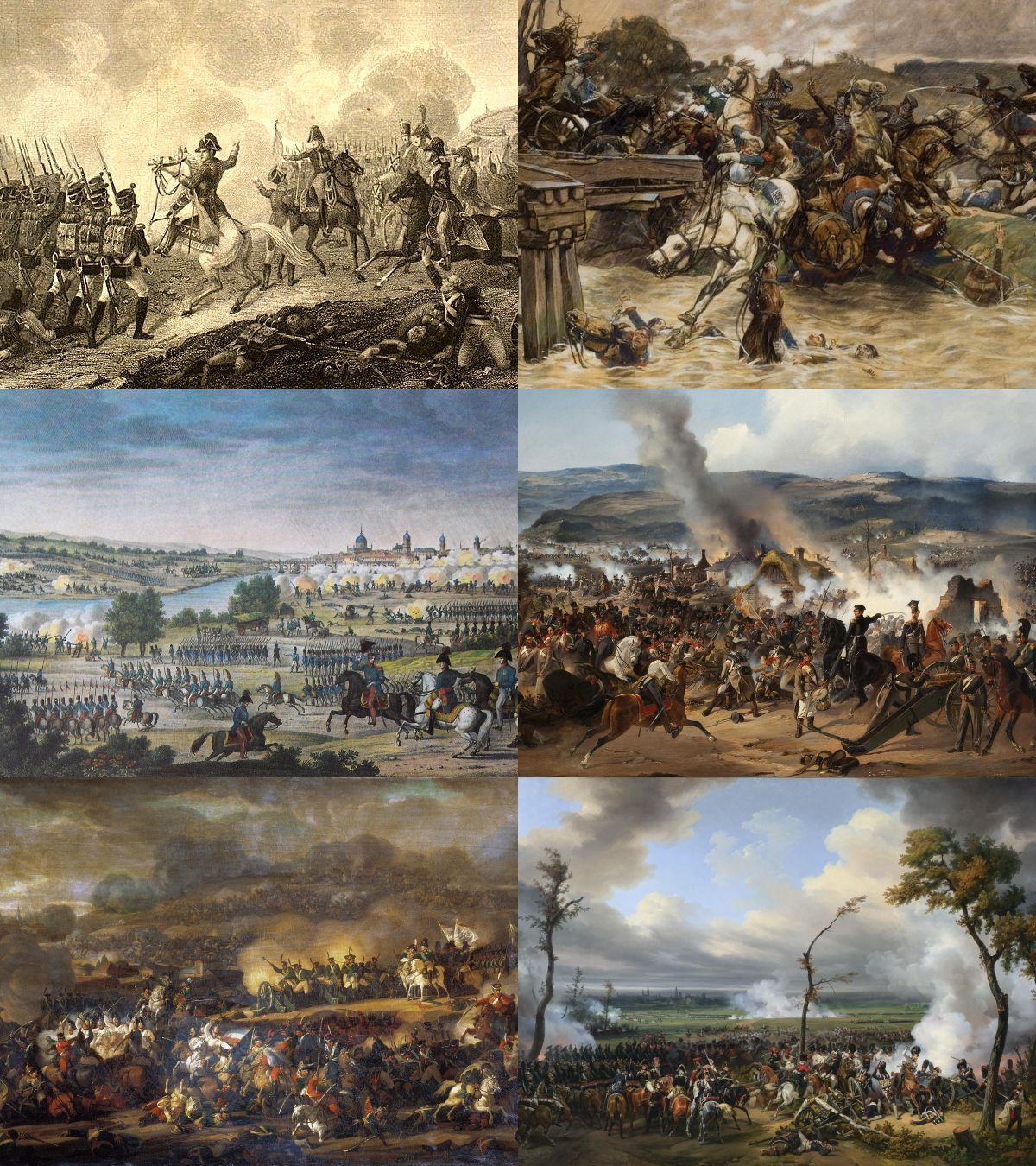
- War of the Sixth Coalition Click an image to load the battle. Left to right, top to bottom: Battles of Lützen, Katzbach, Dresden, Kulm, Leipzig, Hanau
Date	17 March – 2 November 1813
Location	Saxony; Lower Silesia; Northern Germany
Result	Coalition victory
Territorial changes	Confederation of the Rhine dissolved; Formation of the German Confederation in 1815; Netherlands regains independence; Norway ceded to the King of Sweden

Belligerents
Russia; United Kingdom; Sweden (Netherlands) Netherlands; German states: Austria; Prussia (Grand Duchy of Mecklenburg-Schwerin) Mecklenburg-Schwerin; Hanover; Bavaria (Kingdom of Saxony) Saxony; Württemberg	France: Confederation of the Rhine (Note: Dissolved following Battle of Leipzig.); Duchy of Warsaw; (Kingdom of Italy (Napoleonic)) Italy; (Kingdom of Naples) Naples; Denmark–Norway

Commanders and leaders
(Russian Empire) Alexander I (Sweden) Crown Prince Karl Johan (Austrian Empire) Francis I (Austrian Empire) Karl von Schwarzenberg (Kingdom of Prussia) Frederick William III (Kingdom of Prussia) Ludwig Yorck von Wartenburg (Kingdom of Prussia) Gebhard Leberecht von Blücher (Kingdom of Prussia) Friedrich Wilhelm von Bülow (Kingdom of Bavaria) Maximilian I Joseph (Grand Duchy of Mecklenburg-Schwerin) Frederick Francis I (Kingdom of Saxony) Frederick Augustus (Kingdom of Württemberg) Frederick I (Russian Empire) Barclay de Tolly (Russian Empire) Levin August von Bennigsen (Russian Empire) Matvei Platov (Russian Empire) Peter Wittgenstein (Netherlands) William I of Orange-Nassau (United Kingdom of Great Britain and Ireland) (Electorate of Brunswick-Lüneburg) George, Prince Regent (United Kingdom of Great Britain and Ireland) Robert Jenkinson (United Kingdom of Great Britain and Ireland) Arthur Wellesley	(First French Empire) Napoleon I (First French Empire) Pierre Augereau (First French Empire) Jean-Baptiste Bessières † (First French Empire) Louis-Nicolas Davout (First French Empire) Jacques MacDonald (First French Empire) Auguste de Marmont (First French Empire) Édouard Mortier (First French Empire) Michel Ney (First French Empire) Nicolas Oudinot (First French Empire) Laurent de Gouvion Saint-Cyr (First French Empire) Jean-de-Dieu Soult (First French Empire) Claude Victor-Perrin (First French Empire) Jacques Lauriston (POW); Józef Poniatowski † (Kingdom of Italy (Napoleonic)) Eugène de Beauharnais (Kingdom of Naples) Joachim Murat

Strength
16 August 1813: Total: 860,000 men Field army: 512,113 men 1,380 guns	16 August 1813: Total: 700,000 men Field army: 442,810 men 1,284 guns

Casualties and losses
360,000 (Note: This is the total Casualties in 1813): 275,000 killed and wounded; 85,000 captured and missing	460,000 (Note: This is the total Casualties in 1813): 270,000 killed and wounded; 190,000 captured and missing
- Casualty statistics are the total losses of 1813.

The German campaign (German: Befreiungskriege, lit. 'Wars of Liberation') was fought in 1813. Members of the Sixth Coalition, including the German states of Austria and Prussia, plus Russia and Sweden, fought a series of battles in Germany against the French Emperor Napoleon, his marshals, and the armies of the Confederation of the Rhine – an alliance of most of the other German states, – which ended the domination of the First French Empire. (Note: In the German states it became known as the Befreiungskriege (Wars of Liberation) or Freiheitskriege (Wars of Freedom) – both terms were used at the time, both by liberals and nationalists who hoped for a unified Germany and by conservatives after the Bourbon Restoration to mean restauring the old aristocratic order and freeing Europe from French hegemony and occupation. It is also known as the europäische Befreiungskriege (European Wars of Liberation), to distinguish it from the 1808 Spanish Uprising during the Peninsular War.)

After the devastating defeat of Napoleon's Grande Armée in the Russian campaign of 1812, Johann Yorck – the general in command of the Grande Armée's German auxiliaries (Hilfskorps) – declared a ceasefire with the Russians on 30 December 1812 via the Convention of Tauroggen. This was the decisive factor in the outbreak of the German campaign the following year.

The spring campaign between France and the Sixth Coalition ended inconclusively with a summer truce (Truce of Pläswitz). Via the Trachenberg Plan, developed during a period of ceasefire in the summer of 1813, the ministers of Prussia, Russia, and Sweden agreed to pursue a single allied strategy against Napoleon. Following the end of the ceasefire, Austria eventually sided with the coalition, thwarting Napoleon's hopes of reaching separate agreements with Austria and Russia. The coalition now had a clear numerical superiority, which they eventually brought to bear on Napoleon's main forces, however very stubborn fighting by the French greatly slowed coalition efforts, and they launched incursions into Brandenburg, Bohemia, and Silesia. The French armies found initial but costly victories, depleting Napoleon's troops. The high point of allied strategy was the Battle of Nations in October 1813, where the allies succeeded in trapping and encircling Napoleon, and ended in a decisive defeat for Napoleon. The French army experienced a complete collapse and withdrew from all territory west of the Rhine, the Confederation of the Rhine was dissolved following the battle, and many of its former member states joining the Coalition which broke Napoleon's hold over Germany.

After a delay in which a new strategy was agreed upon, on the first day of 1814 the coalition invaded France, Succeeding Duke of Wellington's British army northward from Spain into southern France. Napoleon was forced to abdicate and Louis XVIII assumed the French throne. The war came to a formal end with the Treaty of Paris in May 1814.

War of the Sixth Coalition:
German campaign
Napoleon in command
Napoleon not in command

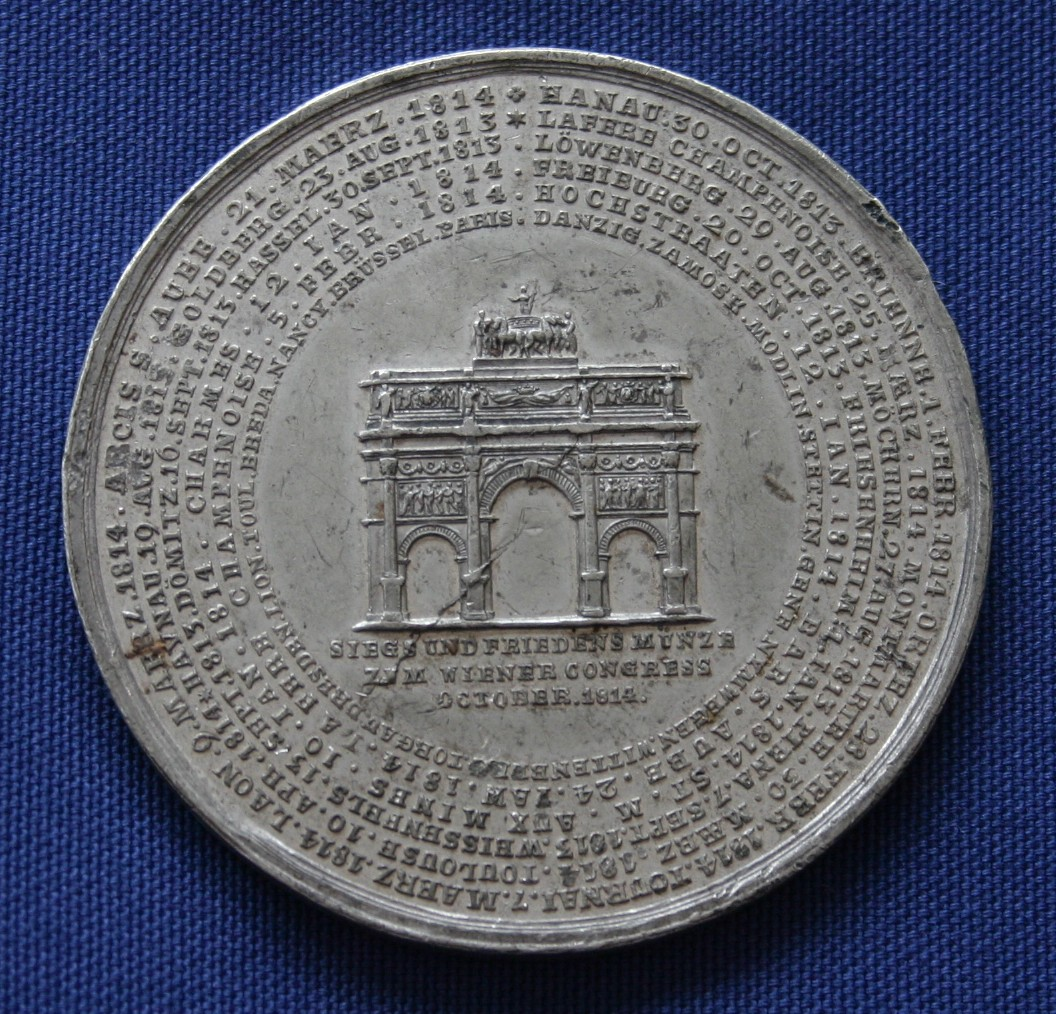
Battles of the German campaign inscribed on a medal

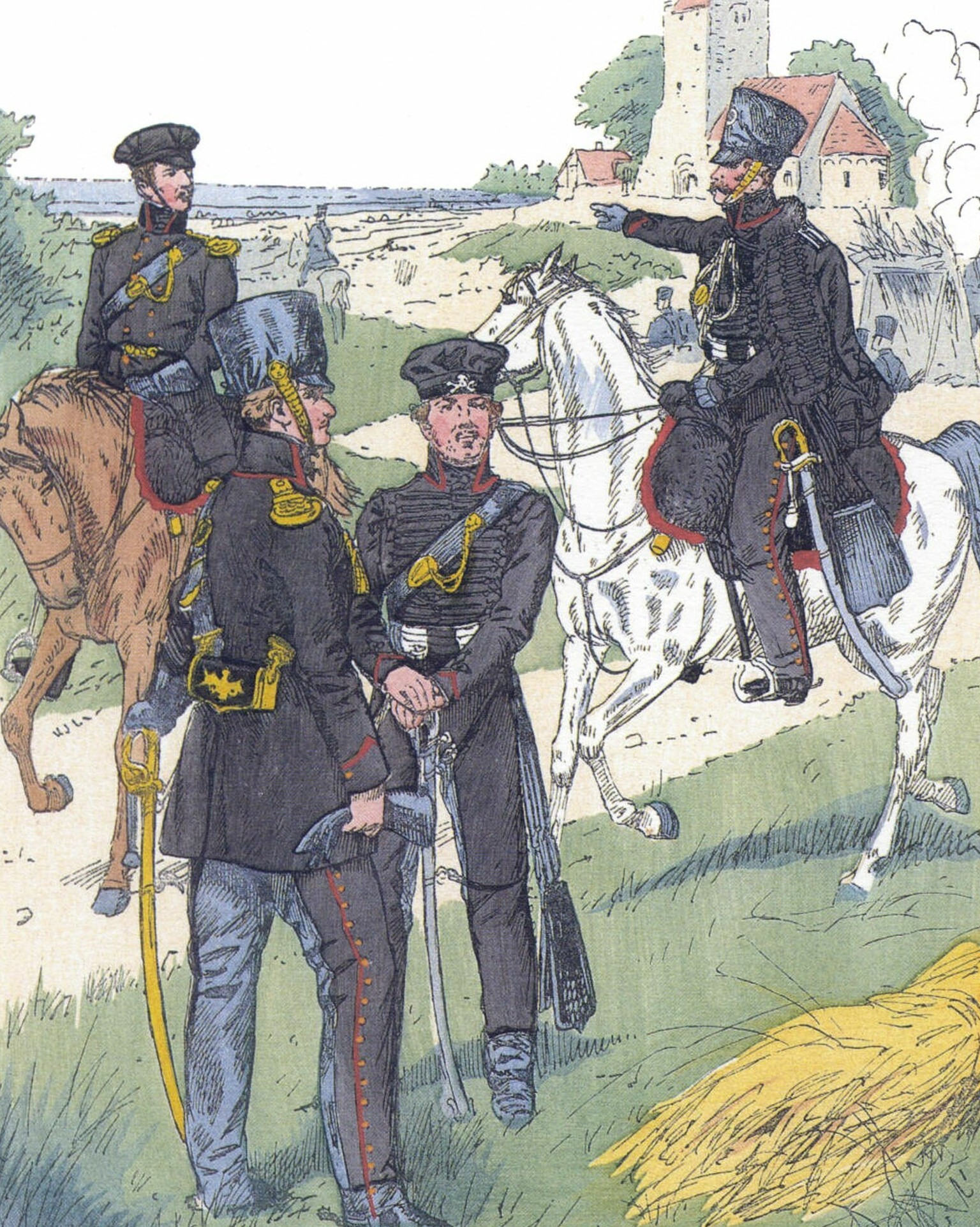
Cavalry of the Lützow Free Corps

== Background ==
Since 1806 writers and intellectuals such as Johann Philipp Palm, Johann Gottlieb Fichte, Ernst Moritz Arndt, Friedrich Ludwig Jahn, and Theodor Körner had been criticising the French occupation of much of Germany. They advocated limitations to the dynastic princes of Germany and a joint effort by all Germans, including Prussians and Austrians, to eject the French. From 1810, Arndt and Jahn repeatedly asked high-ranking figures in Prussian society to prepare such an uprising. Jahn himself organised the German League and made a major contribution to the founding of the Lützow Free Corps. These forerunners took part in the outbreak of hostilities in Germany, both by serving in the armed forces and by backing the coalition through their writings.

Even before the German campaign, there had been uprisings against French troops occupying Germany – these had broken out from 1806 onwards in Hesse and in 1809 during the Tyrolean Rebellion. These uprisings intensified in the same year under Wilhelm von Dörnberg, the initiator and commander-in-chief of the Hessian uprising, and Major Ferdinand von Schill.

== Course ==
Following the near-destruction of Napoleon's Grande Armée in Russia in 1812, Johann Yorck – the general in command of the Grande Armée's German auxiliaries (Hilfskorps) from the Confederation of the Rhine – declared a ceasefire with the Russians on 30 December 1812 via the Convention of Tauroggen. This was the decisive factor in the outbreak of the German campaign the following year.

On 17 March 1813 – the day Emperor Alexander I of Russia arrived in the Hoflager of King Frederick William III – Prussia declared war on France. On 20 March 1813, the Schlesische privilegierte Zeitung newspaper published Frederick's speech entitled An Mein Volk, delivered on 17 March and calling for a war of liberation. In addition to newly formed Prussian units such as the Landwehr and Landsturm, the initial fighting was undertaken by volunteers such as German volunteer troops, Jäger units, Free Corps (such as the Lützow Free Corps), and troops from Russia, (from the summer of 1813 onwards) Sweden under Crown Prince Charles John (the former French marshal Jean-Baptiste Bernadotte), and Austria under Field Marshal Karl von Schwarzenberg. Already busy with maintaining naval supremacy and fighting in the Peninsular War, Great Britain did not take any direct part in the German campaign, though it sent subsidies to support it. A single congreave rocket battery commanded by Captain Richard Bogue took part in the 1813 campaign. He was killed at Leipzig.

== The War of Liberation ==
The Convention of Tauroggen is regarded as the starting point of Prussia's national revival. As news of the destruction of the Grande Armée spread, and the arrival of large numbers of stragglers confirmed the scale of the disaster for the Prussian people, resentment built up over years of French domination began to surface openly. King Frederick William III and his ministers faced a difficult situation; aware of France's resources and Napoleon's capacity for recovery, they did not believe their difficulties were over. Publicly disavowing the actions of the Prussian army and the secret defence societies active across northern Germany risked destabilizing the monarchy, while open attack on the retreating remnants of the Grande Armée risked severe retaliation from the new French armies being assembled on the Rhine.

But the Russians and the soldiers were resolved to continue the campaign, and working in collusion they put pressure on the not unwilling representatives of the civil power to facilitate the supply and equipment of such troops as were still in the field; they could not refuse food and shelter to their starving countrymen or their loyal allies, and thus by degrees the French garrisons scattered about the country either found themselves surrounded or were compelled to retire to avoid that fate. Thus it happened that Prince Eugène de Beauharnais, the viceroy of Italy, felt compelled to retreat from the positions that Napoleon ordered him to hold at al costs to his advanced position at Poznań (German: Posen), where about 14,000 men had gradually rallied around him, and to withdraw step by step to Magdeburg, where he met reinforcements and commanded the whole course of the lower Elbe.

== Napoleon's preparations ==
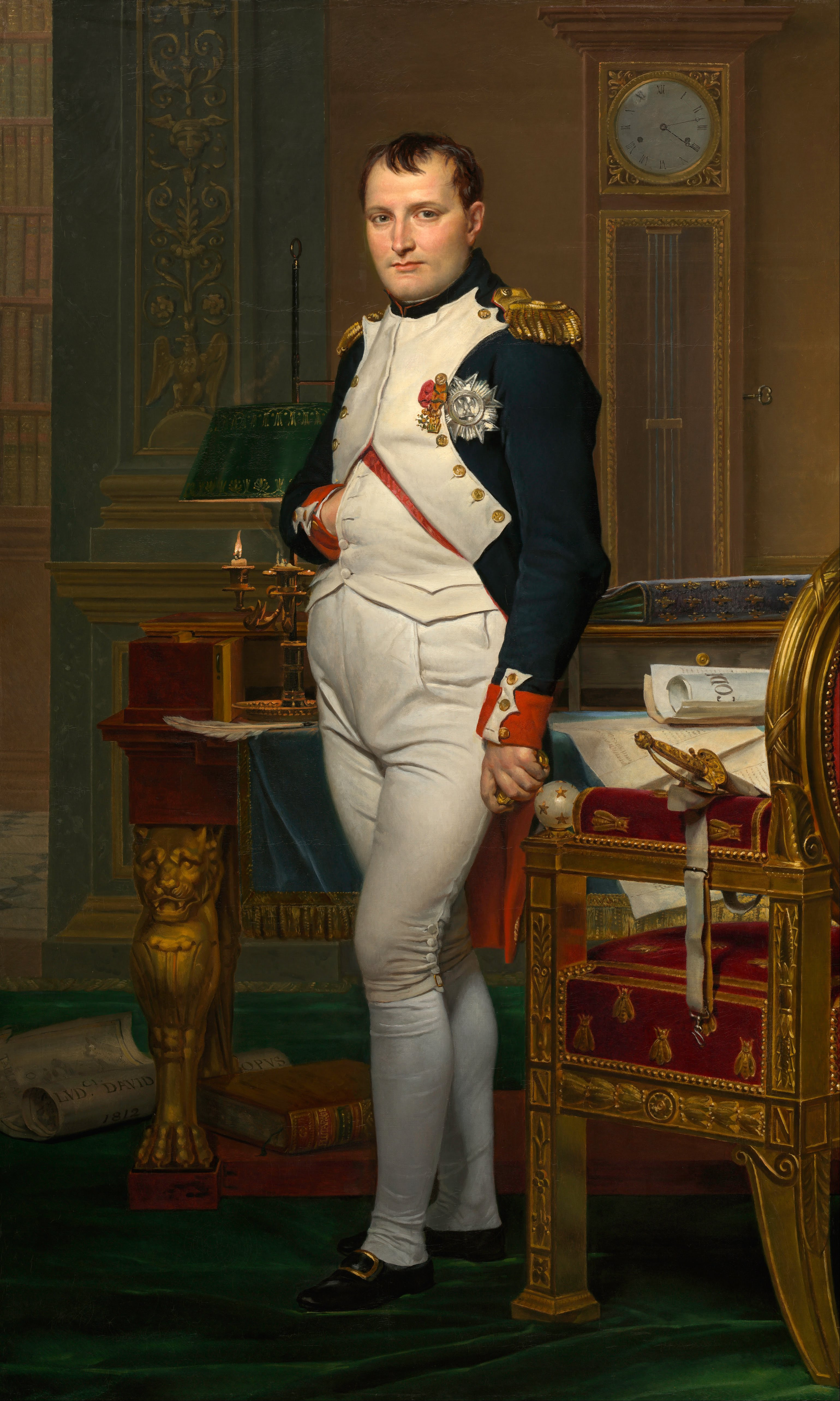
Napoleon in 1812. Painting by Jacques-Louis David.

Meanwhile in Paris, Napoleon had been raising and organizing a new army for the reconquest of Prussia. Thanks to his having compelled his allies to fight his battles for him, he had not as yet drawn very heavily on the fighting resources of France, the actual percentage of men taken by the conscriptions during the years since 1806 being actually lower than that in force in continental armies of today. He had also created in 1811–1812 a new National Guard, organized in cohorts to distinguish it from the regular army, and for home defence only, and these by a skillful appeal to their patriotism and judicious pressure applied through the prefects, became a useful reservoir of half-trained men for new battalions of the active army. Levies were also made with rigorous severity in the states of the Rhine Confederation, and even Italy was called on for fresh sacrifices. In this manner by the end of March, 200,000 men were moving towards the Elbe, (Note: Napoleon always gave them 300,000, but this number was never attained (Maude 1911, p. 229).) and in the first fortnight of April, they were duly concentrated in the angle formed by the Elbe and Saale, threatening on the one hand Berlin and on the other, Dresden and the east.

== Spring campaign ==
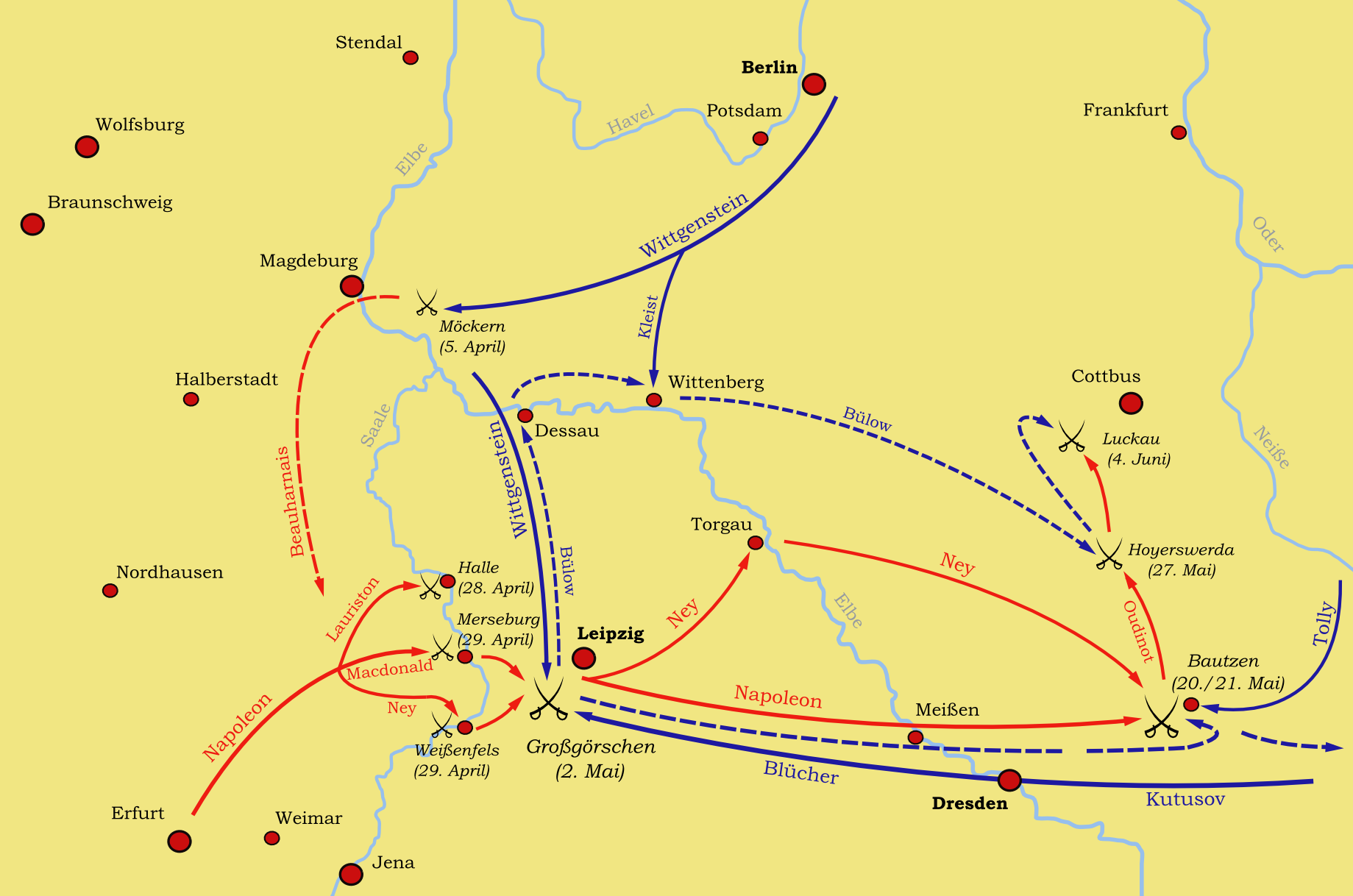
Map of the spring campaign

The coalition, aware of the gradual strengthening of their enemy's forces but themselves as yet unable to put more than 200,000 in the field, had left a small corps of observation opposite Magdeburg and along the Elbe to give timely notice of an advance towards Berlin; and with the bulk of their forces having taken up position near Dresden, whence they had determined to march down the course of the Elbe and roll up the French from right to left. Both armies were very indifferently supplied with information, as both were without any reliable regular cavalry capable of piercing the screen of outposts with which each endeavoured to conceal his disposition, and Napoleon, operating in mostly unfriendly territory, suffered more in this respect than his adversaries.

On 25 April, Napoleon reached Erfurt and assumed command. That same day, his troops stood in the following positions. Eugène, with Marshal Jacques MacDonald's and Generals Jacques Lauriston's and Jean Reynier's corps on the lower Saale, Marshal Michel Ney in front of Weimar, holding the defile of Kösen; the Imperial Guard at Erfurt, Marshal Auguste de Marmont at Gotha, General Henri Bertrand at Saalfeld, and Marshal Nicolas Oudinot at Coburg, and during the next few days the whole were set in motion towards Merseburg and Leipzig, in the now stereotyped Napoleonic order, a strong advanced guard of all arms leading, the remainder—about two-thirds of the whole—following as "masse de manœuvre", this time, owing to the cover afforded by the Elbe on the left, to the right rear of the advanced guard.

Meanwhile, the Prussians and Russians had concentrated all available men and were moving in an almost parallel line, but somewhat to the south of the direction taken by the French. On 1 May, Napoleon and the advance guard entered Lützen. Russian General Peter Wittgenstein, who now commanded the Coalition allies in place of Field Marshal Mikhail Kutuzov, hearing of his approach, had decided to attack the French advance guard, which he mistakenly believed to be their whole force, on its right flank, and during the morning had drawn together the bulk of his forces on his right in the vicinity of Gross-Görschen and Kaya.

=== Battle of Lützen ===
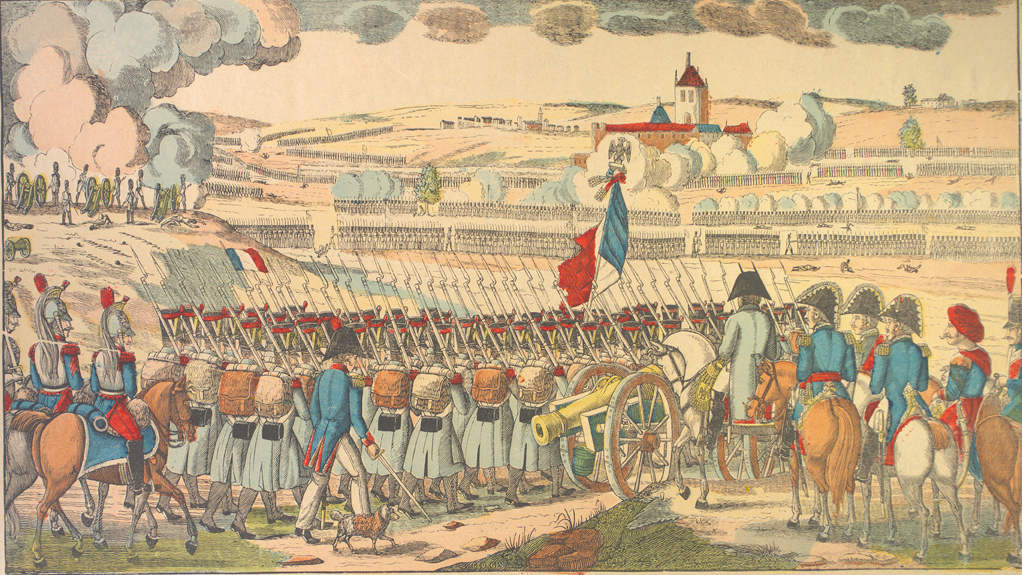
The Battle of Lützen

At around 09:00 on 2 May, Wittgenstein began his attack on the French advance guard in Lützen, whilst the remainder of his army was directed against Napoleon's right and rear. Just as the latter were moving off the heads of the French main body suddenly appeared, and at 11:00 Napoleon, then standing near the Gustavus Adolphus Monument on the field of Lützen, heard the roar of a heavy cannonade to his right rear. He realized the situation in a moment, galloped to the scene, and at once grouped his forces for a decisive action—the gift in which he was supreme. Leaving the leading troops to repulse as best they might the furious attack of the Prussians and Russians, and caring little whether they lost ground, he rapidly organized for his own control a battle-reserve. At length when both sides were exhausted by their efforts, he sent forward nearly a hundred guns which tore into the enemy's line with caseshot and marched his reserve right through the gap. Had he possessed an adequate cavalry force, the victory would have been decisive. As it was, the coalition retreated in good order and the French were too exhausted for a pursuit.

In the opinion of the military historian Frederic Maude writing in the Encyclopædia Britannica 11th Edition (1911) perhaps no battle better exemplifies the inherent strength of Napoleon's strategy, and in none was his grasp of the battlefield more brilliantly displayed, for, as he fully recognized, "These Prussians have at last learnt something—they are no longer the wooden toys of Frederick the Great", and, on the other hand, the relative inferiority of his own men as compared with his veterans of Austerlitz called for far more individual effort than on any previous day. He was everywhere, encouraging and compelling his men—it is a legend in the French army that the persuasion even of the imperial boot was used upon some of his reluctant conscripts, and in the result his system was fully justified, as it triumphed even against a great tactical surprise.

=== Battle of Bautzen ===
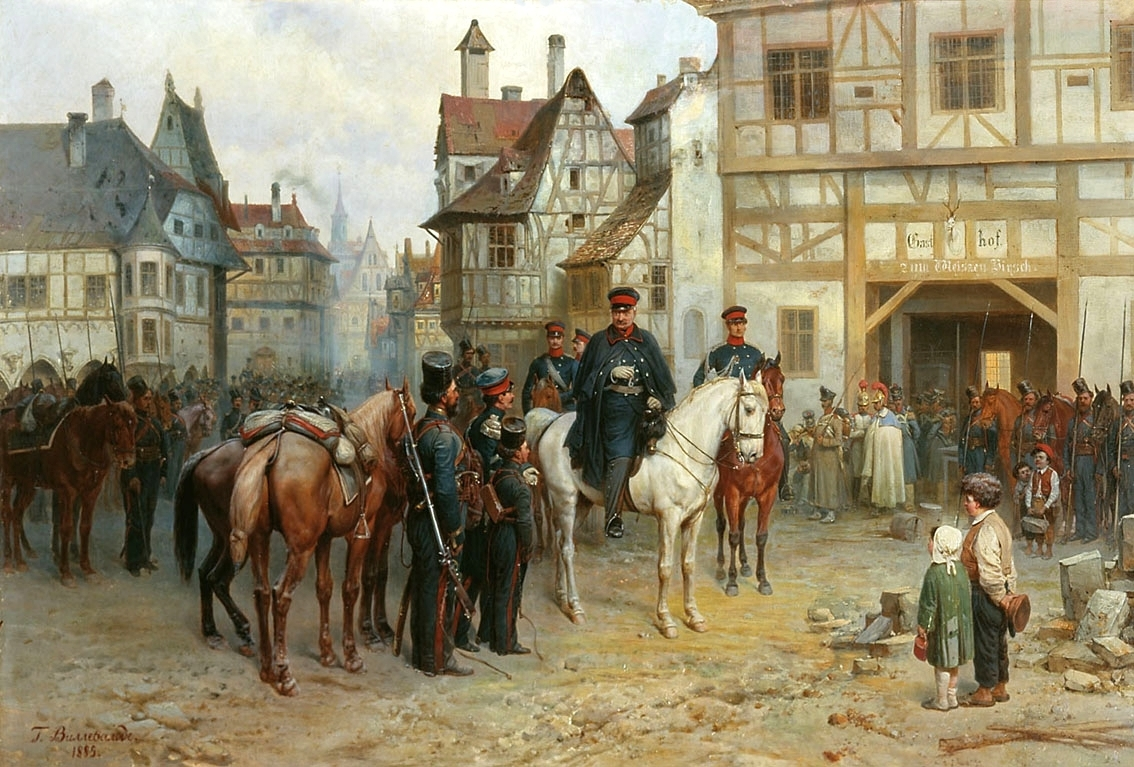
General Gebhard Leberecht von Blücher and Cossacks in Bautzen, 1813

As soon as possible the army pressed on in pursuit, Ney being sent across the Elbe to turn the position of the Coalition allies at Dresden. This threat forced the latter to evacuate the town and retire over the Elbe, after blowing up the stone bridge across the river. Napoleon entered the town hard on their heels, but the broken bridge caused a delay of four days, there being no pontoon trains with the army. Ultimately on 18 May the march was renewed, but the Coalition allies had continued their retreat in leisurely fashion, picking up reinforcements by the way. Arrived at the line of the Spree, they took up and fortified a very formidable position about Bautzen. Here, on 20 May, they were attacked, and after a two-day battle dislodged by Napoleon; but the weakness of the French cavalry conditioned both the form of the attack, which was less effective than usual, and the results of the victory, which were extremely meagre.

The Coalition allies broke off the action at their own time and retired in such good order that Napoleon failed to capture a single trophy as proof of his victory. The enemy's escape annoyed him greatly, the absence of captured guns and prisoners reminded him too much of his Russian experiences, and he redoubled his demands on his corps commanders for greater vigour in the pursuit. This led the latter to push on without due regard to tactical precautions, and Blücher took advantage of their carelessness when at the Battle of Haynau (26 May), with some twenty squadrons of Landwehr cavalry, he surprised, rode over and almost destroyed General Nicolas Maison's division. The material loss inflicted on the French was not very great, but its effect in raising the morale of the raw Prussian cavalry and increasing their confidence in their old commander was enormous.

=== The occupations of Hamburg ===
Meanwhile, on 19 May 1813, a Swedish corps of 15,000 occupied Hamburg without orders from Bernadotte, following a Danish declaration that they would hold the city for Napoleon, irrevocably binding Denmark to France, an action that would guarantee full Swedish cooperation in North Germany. The Swedish occupation of Hamburg came as welcome news to the Allies, insofar as holding a wealthy center of finance was a blow against Napoleon. However, Bernadotte's initial misgivings at extending his troops so far from the Allied lines were validated when Marshal Davout approached Hamburg with a large French force of 35,000, intent on retaking the city. The Swedes quietly withdrew on 26 May and Davout would occupy the city until after Napoleon's abdication in 1814. It would be the last major action of the spring before the Armistice of Pläswitz.

== Summer truce ==
Still, the coalition continued their retreat and the French were unable to force them into battle. In view of the doubtful attitude of Austria, Napoleon became alarmed at the gradual lengthening of his lines of communication and opened negotiations. The enemy, having everything to gain and nothing to lose thereby, agreed finally to a six weeks suspension of arms under the terms of the Truce of Pläswitz. In Maude's opinion, this was perhaps the gravest error of Napoleon's military career.

During the armistice, three Allied sovereigns, Alexander of Russia, Frederick William of Prussia, and Bernadotte of Sweden (by then Regent of the Kingdom due to his adoptive father's illness) met at Trachenberg Castle in Silesia to coordinate the war effort. Allied staffs began creating a plan for the campaign wherein Bernadotte put to use his twenty years of experience as a French general, as well as his familiarity with Napoleon. The result was the Trachenberg Plan, authored primarily by Bernadotte, with contributions from the Austrian Chief of Staff, Field-Marshal Lieutenant Joseph Radetzky, that sought to wear down the French using a Fabian Strategy, avoiding direct combat with Napoleon, engaging and defeating his marshals whenever possible and slowly encircling the French with three independent armies until the French Emperor could be cornered and brought to battle against vastly superior numbers.

Following the conference, the Allies stood up their three armies: The Army of Silesia, with 95,000 Prussians and Russians, commanded by Field Marshal Gebhard von Blücher, the Army of the North, 135,000 Swedes, Russians, Prussians, and German troops from Mecklenburg, the Hanseatic region and North Germany, under the independent command of Sweden's Crown Prince Bernadotte, and the primary Allied force in the field, with which the Allied sovereigns Alexander, Francis and Frederick William oversaw the Campaign, numbering 225,000 Austrians and Russians commanded by Prince Karl von Schwarzenberg.

== Autumn campaign ==
As soon as a suspension of arms (to 15 August) had been agreed to, Napoleon hastened to withdraw his troops from the dangerous position they occupied with reference to the passes leading over the mountains from Bohemia, for he entertained no doubt now that Austria was also to be considered as an enemy. Finally he decided to group his corps round Görlitz and Bautzen whence they could either meet the enemy advancing from Breslau or fall on his flank over the mountains if they attempted to force their way into Saxony by the valley of the Elbe. This latter manoeuvre depended, however, on his maintenance of Dresden, and to this end he sent the I Corps up the Elbe to Pirna and Königstein to cover the fortifications of Dresden itself. His instructions on this point deserve the closest study, for he foresaw the inevitable attraction which a complete entrenched camp would exercise even upon himself, and, therefore, limited his engineers to the construction of a strong bridge head on the right bank and a continuous enceinte, broken only by gaps for counter attack, around the town itself.

Then Napoleon turned his attention to the plan for the coming campaign. Seeing clearly that his want of an efficient cavalry precluded all ideas of a resolute offensive in his old style, he determined to limit himself to a defence of the line of the Elbe, making only dashes of a few days duration at any target the enemy might present.

Reinforcements had been coming up without ceasing and at the beginning of August Napoleon calculated that he would have 300,000 men available about Bautzen and 100,000 along the Elbe from Hamburg via Magdeburg to Torgau. With the latter he determined to strike the first blow, by a concentric advance on Berlin (which he calculated he would reach on the 4th or 5th day), the movement being continued thence to extricate the French garrisons in Küstrin, Stettin and Danzig. The moral effect, he promised himself, would be prodigious, and there was neither room nor food for these 100,000 elsewhere.

Towards the close of the armistice Napoleon learned the general situation of the Coalition allies. The Crown Prince of Sweden, Charles John, formerly Marshal Jean Baptiste Jules Bernadotte, with his Swedes, a Russian corps, a North German contingent of 10,000, two Prussian corps, and various Prussian levies, 135,000 in all, lay in and around Berlin and Stettin; and knowing his former marshal well, Napoleon considered Oudinot a match for him. Blücher with about 95,000 Russians and Prussians were about Breslau, and Schwarzenberg, with nearly 180,000 Austrians and Russians, lay in Bohemia. In his position at Bautzen he felt himself equal to all his enemy's combinations.

=== Battle of Dresden ===
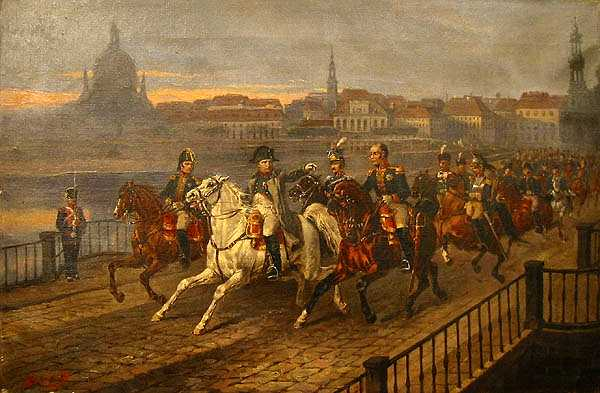
Napoleon crossing the Elbe by Józef Brodowski (1895)

The advance towards Berlin began punctually with the expiration of the armistice. However Napoleon, in command of the main French army, waited to see more clearly his adversaries' plans. At length becoming impatient he advanced a portion of his army towards Blücher, who fell back to draw him into a trap. Then the news reached Napoleon that Schwarzenberg was pressing down the valley of the Elbe, and, leaving Macdonald to observe Blücher, he hurried back to Bautzen to dispose his troops to cross the Bohemian mountains in the general direction of Königstein, a blow which must have had decisive results. But the news from Dresden was so alarming that at the last moment he changed his mind, and sending Vandamme alone over the mountains, he hurried with his whole army to the threatened point. This march remains one of the most extraordinary in history, for the bulk of his forces moved, mainly in mass and across country, 90 miles (140 km) in 72 hours, entering Dresden on the morning of 27 August, only a few hours before the attack of the Coalition allies commenced.

Dresden was the last great victory of the First Empire. By noon on 27 August the Austrians and Russians were completely beaten and in full retreat, the French pressing hard behind them, but meanwhile Napoleon himself again succumbed to one of his unaccountable attacks of apparent intellectual paralysis. He seemed unaware of the vital importance of the moment, crouched shivering over a bivouac fire, and finally rode back to Dresden, leaving no specific orders for the further pursuit.

=== French defeats ===
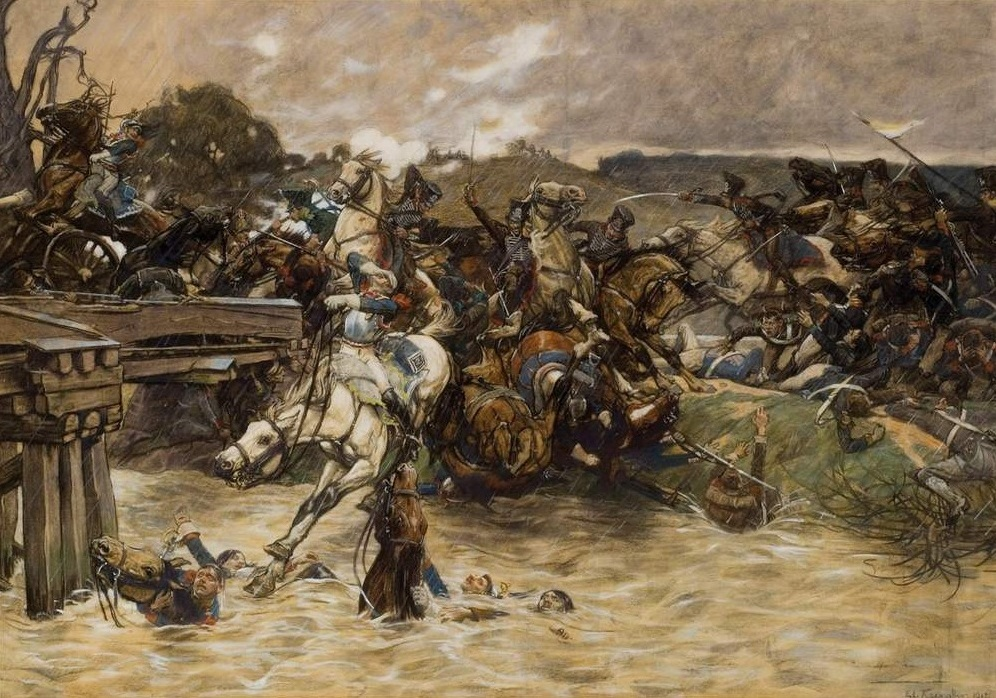
The Battle of the Katzbach, by Eduard Kaempffer

The Coalition allies, however, continued to retreat, and unfortunately for the French, Vandamme, with his single corps and unsupported, issued out of the mountains on their flank, threw himself across their line of retreat near Kulm, and was completely overwhelmed by sheer weight of numbers (Battle of Kulm, 29 August). In spite of this misfortune, Napoleon could claim a brilliant success for himself, but almost at the same moment news reached him that Oudinot had been severely defeated at the Battle of Grossbeeren (23 August) near Berlin by Bernadotte as had Macdonald at the Battle of Katzbach (26 August) by Blücher.

=== Napoleon's movements ===
During the next two days Napoleon examined his situation and dictated a series of notes which have been a puzzle to every strategical thinker ever since. In these he seems suddenly to have cut adrift from every military principle the truth of which the French military so brilliantly demonstrated for decades, in them he considers plans based on hypothesis, not knowledge, and on the importance of geographical points without reference to the enemy's field army.

From these reveries he was at length awakened by news which indicated that the consequences of Macdonald's defeat had been far more serious to the morale of that command than he had imagined. He immediately rode over to establish order, and his manner and violence were so improper that Caulaincourt had the greatest difficulty in concealing the scandal.

Blücher, however, hearing of Napoleon's arrival, at once retreated and Napoleon followed, thus uncovering the passes over the Bohemian mountains, a fact of which Schwarzenberg was quick to take advantage. Learning of his approach, Napoleon again withdrew to Bautzen.

Then hearing that the Austrians had counter-marched and were again moving towards Dresden, Napoleon hastened back there, concentrated as many men as could conveniently be handled, and advanced beyond Pirna and Königstein to meet him. But the Austrians had no intention of attacking him, for time was now working on their side and, leaving his men to starve in the exhausted district, Napoleon again returned to Dresden, where for the rest of the month he remained in an extraordinary state of vacillation. On 4 October he again drew up a review of the situation, in which he apparently contemplated giving up his communications with France and wintering in and around Dresden, though at the same time he is aware of the distress amongst his men for want of food.

=== Leipzig campaign ===
Meanwhile Blücher, Schwarzenberg, and Bernadotte were working round Napoleon's flanks. Ney, who had joined Oudinot after Grossbeeren, was defeated at the Battle of Dennewitz (6 September) by Bernadotte's Army of the North, with Prussian troops doing a majority of the fighting until the end of the battle when Swedish and Russian troops arrived and routed the French. Suddenly Napoleon's plans were again reviewed and completely changed. Calling up St Cyr, whom he had already warned to remain at Dresden with his command, he decided to fall back towards Erfurt, and go into winter quarters between that place and Magdeburg, pointing out that Dresden was of no use to him as a base and that if he were to have a battle, it was much better have St Cyr and his men with him than at Dresden.

On 7 October Napoleon drew up a final plan, in which one once again recognizes the old commander, and this he immediately proceeded to put into execution, for he was now quite aware of the danger threatening his line of retreat from both Blücher and Schwarzenberg and the North Army; yet only a few hours afterwards the portion of the order relating to St Cyr and Lobau was cancelled and the two were finally left behind at Dresden. From the 10 to 13 October Napoleon lay at Düben, again a prey to the most extraordinary irresolution, but on that day he thought he saw his opportunity. Blücher was reported near Wittenberg, and Schwarzenberg was moving slowly round to the south of Leipzig. The North Army under Bernadotte, unknown to Napoleon, lay on Blücher's left around Halle.

Napoleon decided to throw the bulk of his force on Blücher, and, having routed him, turn south on Schwarzenberg and sever his communications with Bohemia. His concentration was effected with his usual sureness and celerity, but whilst the French moved on Wittenberg, Blücher was marching to his right, indifferent to his communications as all Prussia lay behind him.

This move on 14 October brought him into touch with Bernadotte, and now a single march forward of all three armies would have absolutely isolated Napoleon from France; but Bernadotte's nerve failed him, for on hearing of Napoleon's threat against Wittenberg he decided to retreat northward, and not all the persuasions of Blücher and Gneisenau could move him. Thus if the French movement momentarily ended in a blow in the air, it was indirectly the cause of their ultimate salvation.

==== Battle of the Nations ====
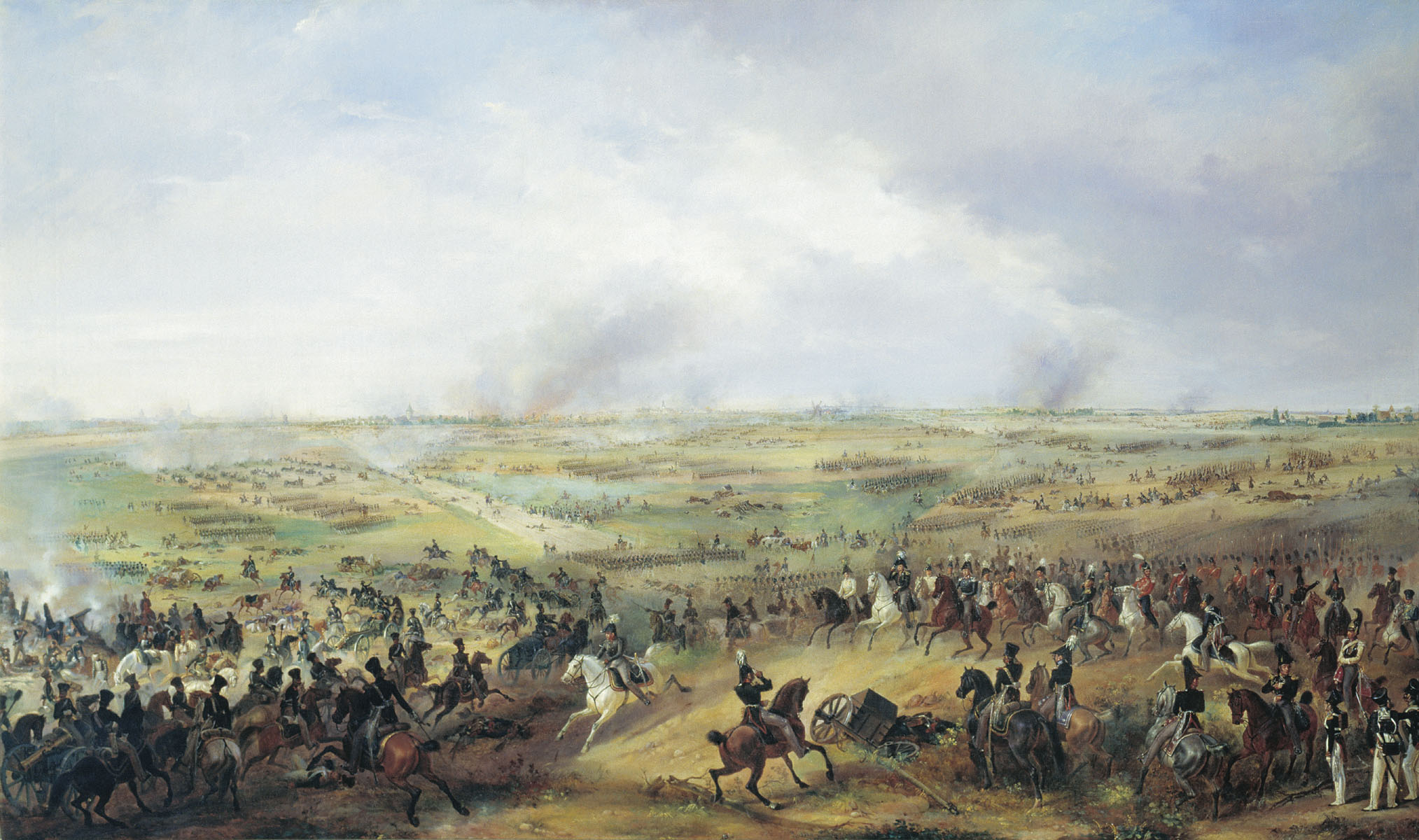
The Battle of Leipzig, by A.I. Zauerweid

On the 15 October Napoleon concentrated his forces to the east of Leipzig, with only a weak detachment to the west, and in the evening the Coalition allies were prepared to attack him. Schwarzenberg had 180,000 men available at once and 60,000 on the following day; Blücher had about 60,000, but Bernadotte now could not arrive before 18 October.

Napoleon prepared to throw the bulk of his force upon Schwarzenberg and massed his troops south-east of the town, whilst Schwarzenberg marched concentrically against him down the valley of the Elster and Pleisse, the mass of his troops on the right bank of the latter and a strong column under Giulay on the left working round to join Blücher on the north. The fighting which followed was most obstinate, but the Austrians failed to make any impression on the French positions, and indeed Giulay felt himself compelled to withdraw to his former position. On the other hand, Blücher carried the village of Möckern and came within a mile of the gates of the town. During the 17th there was only indecisive skirmishing, Schwarzenberg waiting for his reinforcements coming up by the Dresden road, Blücher for Bernadotte to come in on his left, and by some extraordinary oversight Giulay was brought closer in to the Austrian centre, thus opening for the French their line of retreat towards Erfurt, and no information of this movement appears to have been conveyed to Blücher. Napoleon when he became aware of the movement, sent the IV Corps to Lindenau to keep the road open.

On the 18 October the fighting was resumed and by about noon Bernadotte came up and closed the gap to the north-east of the town between Blücher and the Austrians. At 14:00 the Saxons, who had remained faithful to Napoleon longer than his other German allies, went over to Bernadotte's Army of the North a week after the Crown Prince had issued a proclamation calling for the Saxons to rejoin their former commander (Bernadotte had commanded the Saxons during the Wagram Campaign). All hope of saving the battle had now to be given up, but the French covered their retreat obstinately and by daybreak next morning one-half of the army was already filing out along the road to Erfurt which had so fortunately for the French been left for them.

=== Retreat of the French and Battle of Hanau ===
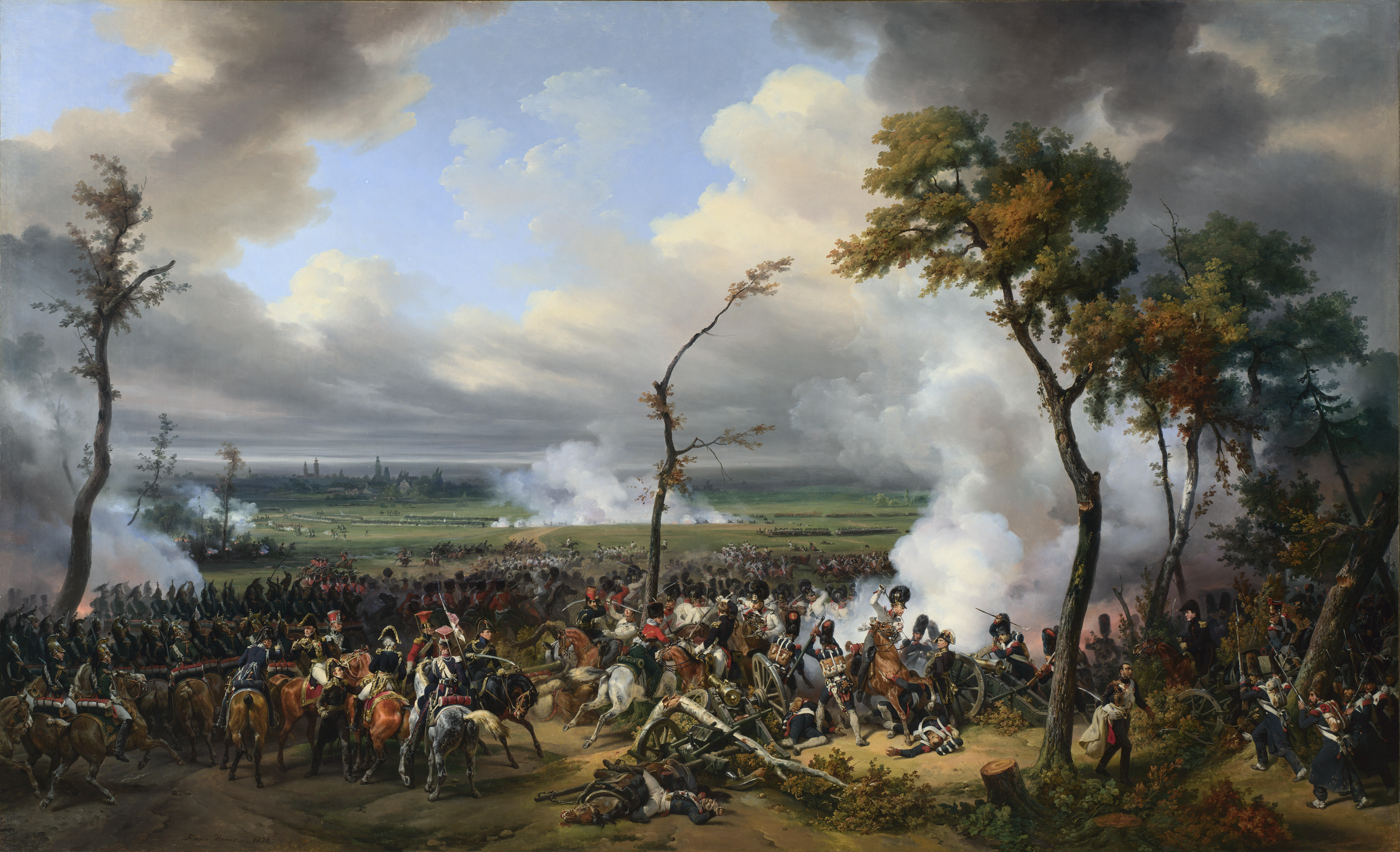
The Battle of Hanau, by Horace Vernet, 1824

It took Blücher time to extricate his troops from the confusion into which the battle had thrown them, and the garrison of Leipzig and the troops left on the right bank of the Elster still resisted obstinately—hence no direct pursuit could be initiated and the French, still upwards of 100,000 strong, marching rapidly, soon gained distance enough to be reformed. Blücher followed by parallel and inferior roads on their northern flank, but Schwarzenberg knowing that the Bavarians also had forsaken Napoleon and were marching under the command of General Karl Philipp von Wrede to intercept his retreat, followed in a most leisurely fashion. Blücher did not succeed in overtaking the French, but the latter, near Hanau, found their way barred by Wrede with 40,000 men and over 100 guns in a strong position.

To this fresh emergency, Napoleon and his army responded in most sacrificial fashion. As at Krasnoi in 1812, Napoleon ordered his troops to go straight for the enemy and after a series of artillery movements, directed by General Drouot, they marched right over the enemy, practically destroying the whole force, yet taking heavy casualties in the process, depleting Napoleon's troops even further. Henceforward, their march was unmolested and the French reached Mainz on 5 November to prepare for the invasion of Eastern France.

== Aftermath ==
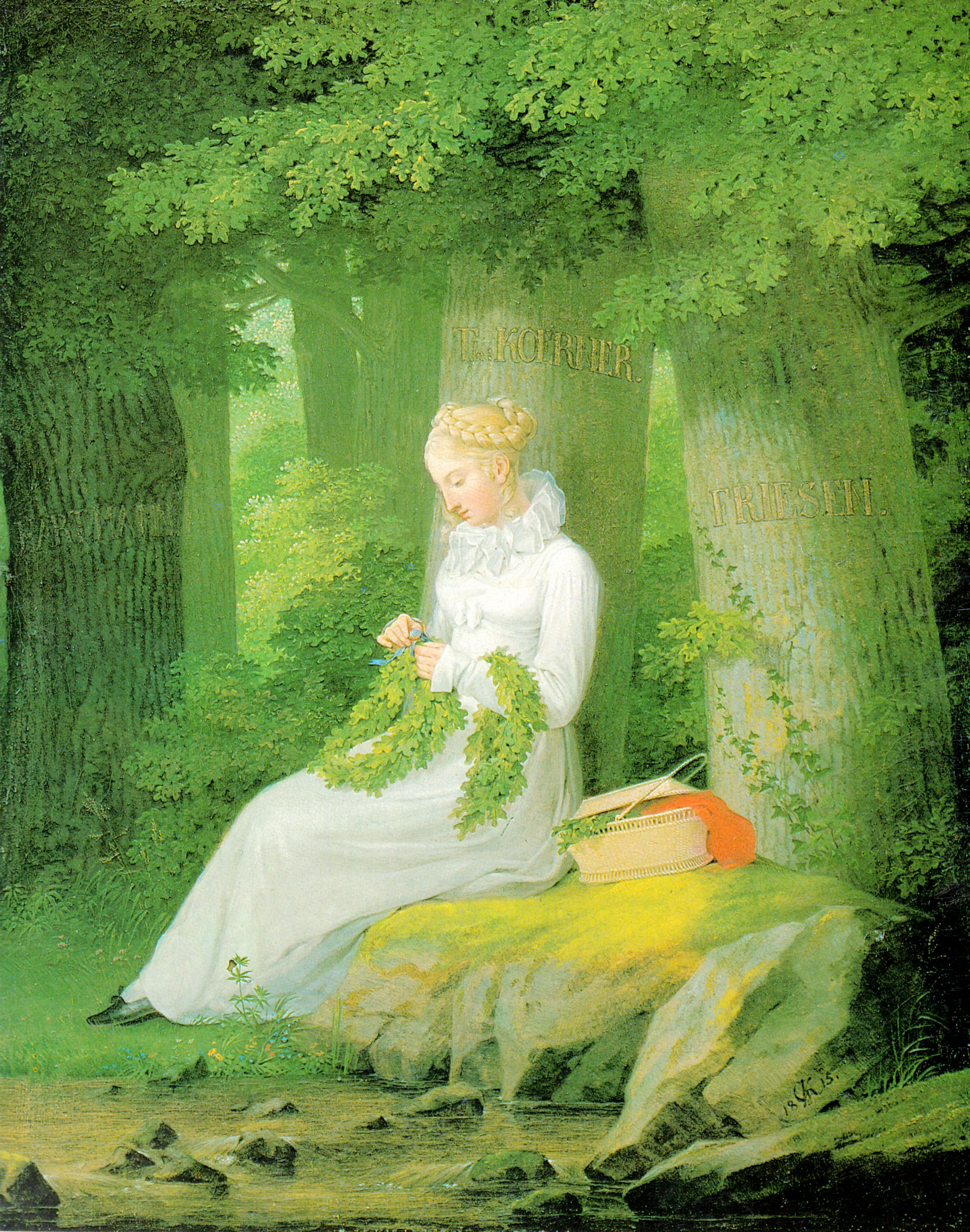
The Wreath Maker – a painting by Georg Friedrich Kersting symbolising the memory of the fallen, whose names are inscribed on the trunks of oak trees

When the last of the French troops crossed Rhine back into France, divided counsels made their appearance at the headquarters of the coalition. Every one was weary of the war, and many felt that it would be unwise to push Napoleon and the French nation to extremes. Hence a prolonged halt arose, utilized by the troops in renewing their equipment and so forth, but ultimately the Young German party, led by Blücher and the principal fighting men of the army, triumphed, and early in 1814 the coalition invaded France.

At the same time, Field Marshal Arthur Wellesley, the Duke of Wellington invaded France over the Pyrenees. Leaving Marshals Jean-de-Dieu Soult and Louis-Gabriel Suchet to defend southwestern France, Napoleon fought and lost a campaign in northeastern France, that ended with the occupation of Paris, the abdication of Napoleon, his exile to Elba, and the Bourbon Restoration under King Louis XVIII.

The campaign ended the French period (Franzosenzeit) in Germany and fostered a new sense of German unity and nationalism. It also marked the exit of Sweden as a player in German affairs after 175 years, as Sweden ceded Swedish Pomerania to Prussia for its recognition of the Treaty of Kiel (including the Union of Sweden and Norway) and £500,000. The German Confederation, formed at the Congress of Vienna in 1815, was a precursor to the modern German nation state, which was, however, only realized more than half a century later under Prussian leadership, with the exclusion of Austria, including Germans in the Sudetanlands of Bohemia. The popular image of the campaign in Germany was shaped by the cultural memory of its veterans, especially the many students who volunteered to fight in the Lützow Free Corps and other units who later rose to high positions in the military and political spheres. A new boom in remembrance of the war occurred in 1913, on the centenary of its outbreak.

== See also ==
- Napoleonic Wars
- Treaty of Kiel
- War of the Sixth Coalition
- Wars and battles involving Prussia
- Dano-Swedish War (1813–1814)
