= Großbeeren =

- Municipality
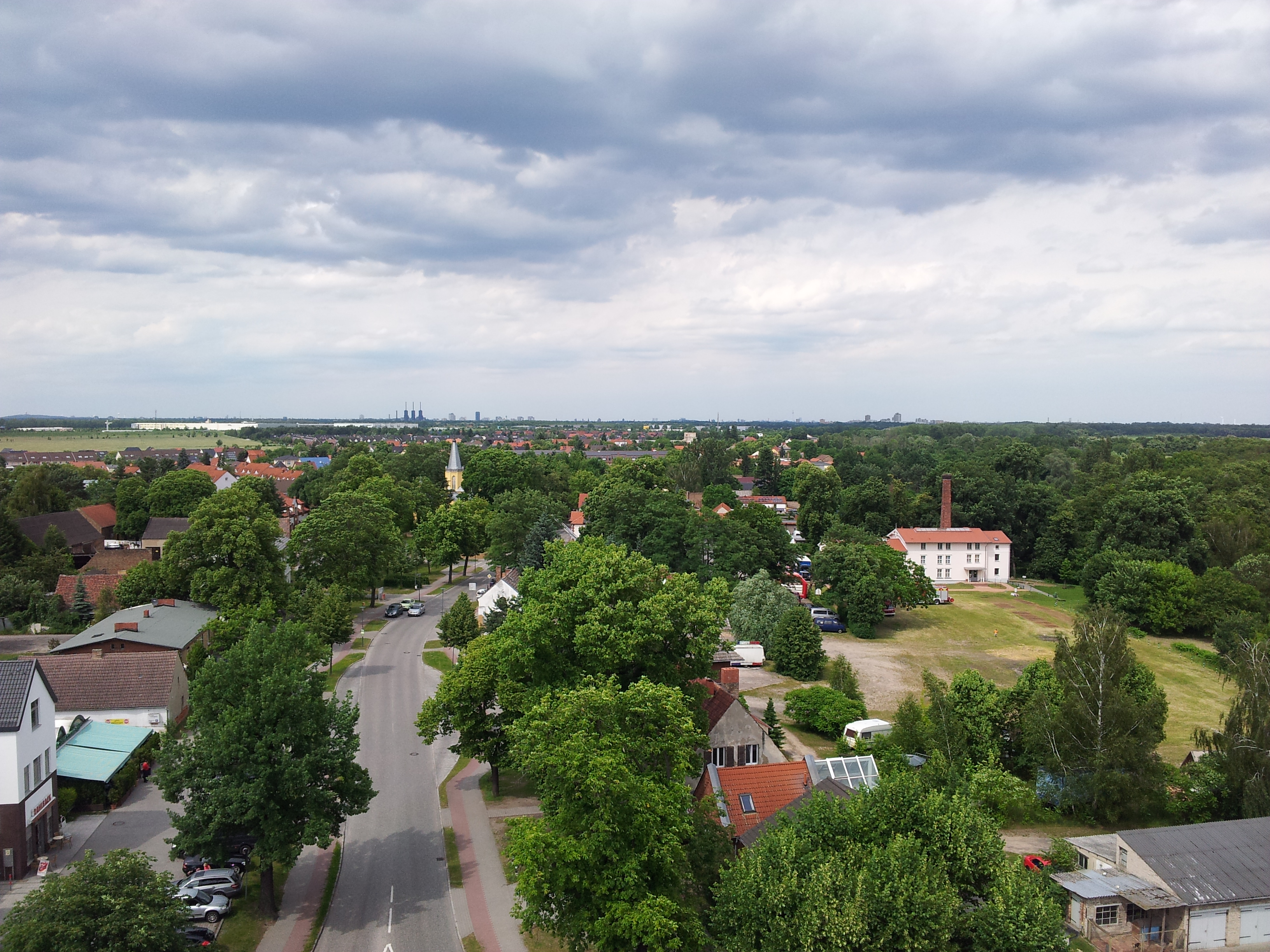
- View from the Battle of Großbeeren Memorial Tower, north towards the village church. Berlin's skyline in the background.

- Coat of arms

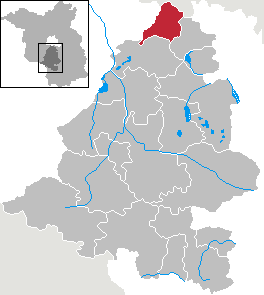
- Location of Großbeeren within Teltow-Fläming district
- Interactive map of Großbeeren
- Location within Germany Location within Brandenburg
- Coordinates: 52°21′16″N 13°18′22″E
- Country: Germany
- State: Brandenburg
- District: Teltow-Fläming
- Subdivisions: 7 Ortsteile

Government
  - Mayor (2018–26): Tobias Borstel (SPD)

Area
  - Total: 51.89 km^{2} (20.03 sq mi)
- Elevation: 42 m (138 ft)

Population (2025-12-31)
  - Total: 9,305
  - Density: 179.3/km^{2} (464.4/sq mi)
- Time zone: UTC+01:00 (CET)
  - Summer (DST): UTC+02:00 (CEST)
- Postal codes: 14979
- Dialling codes: 033701
- Vehicle registration: TF
- Website: www.grossbeeren.de

Großbeeren is a municipality in the district of Teltow-Fläming in the German state of Brandenburg.

== Geography ==
Located about 3 km south of Berlin's city limits. It includes the localities of Diedersdorf, Heinersdorf and Kleinbeeren.

== Demography ==
Development of Population since 1875 within the Current Boundaries (Blue Line: Population; Dotted Line: Comparison to Population Development of Brandenburg state; Grey Background: Time of Nazi rule; Red Background: Time of Communist rule)

Recent Population Development and Projections (Population Development before Census 2011 (blue line); Recent Population Development according to the Census in Germany in 2011 (blue bordered line); Official projections for 2005-2030 (yellow line); for 2017-2030 (scarlet line); for 2020-2030 (green line)

Großbeeren: Population development
within the current boundaries (2020)

Year	Pop.	±% p.a.
1875	1,953	—
1890	2,797	+2.42%
1910	3,547	+1.19%
1925	3,676	+0.24%
1939	4,346	+1.20%
1950	4,434	+0.18%
1964	3,770	−1.15%

Year	Pop.	±% p.a.
1971	3,720	−0.19%
1981	3,460	−0.72%
1985	3,452	−0.06%
1990	3,171	−1.68%
1995	3,778	+3.57%
2000	6,077	+9.97%
2005	7,034	+2.97%

Year	Pop.	±% p.a.
2010	7,466	+1.20%
2015	8,398	+2.38%
2016	8,227	−2.04%
2017	8,393	+2.02%
2018	8,381	−0.14%
2019	8,535	+1.84%
2020	8,804	+3.15%

== History ==
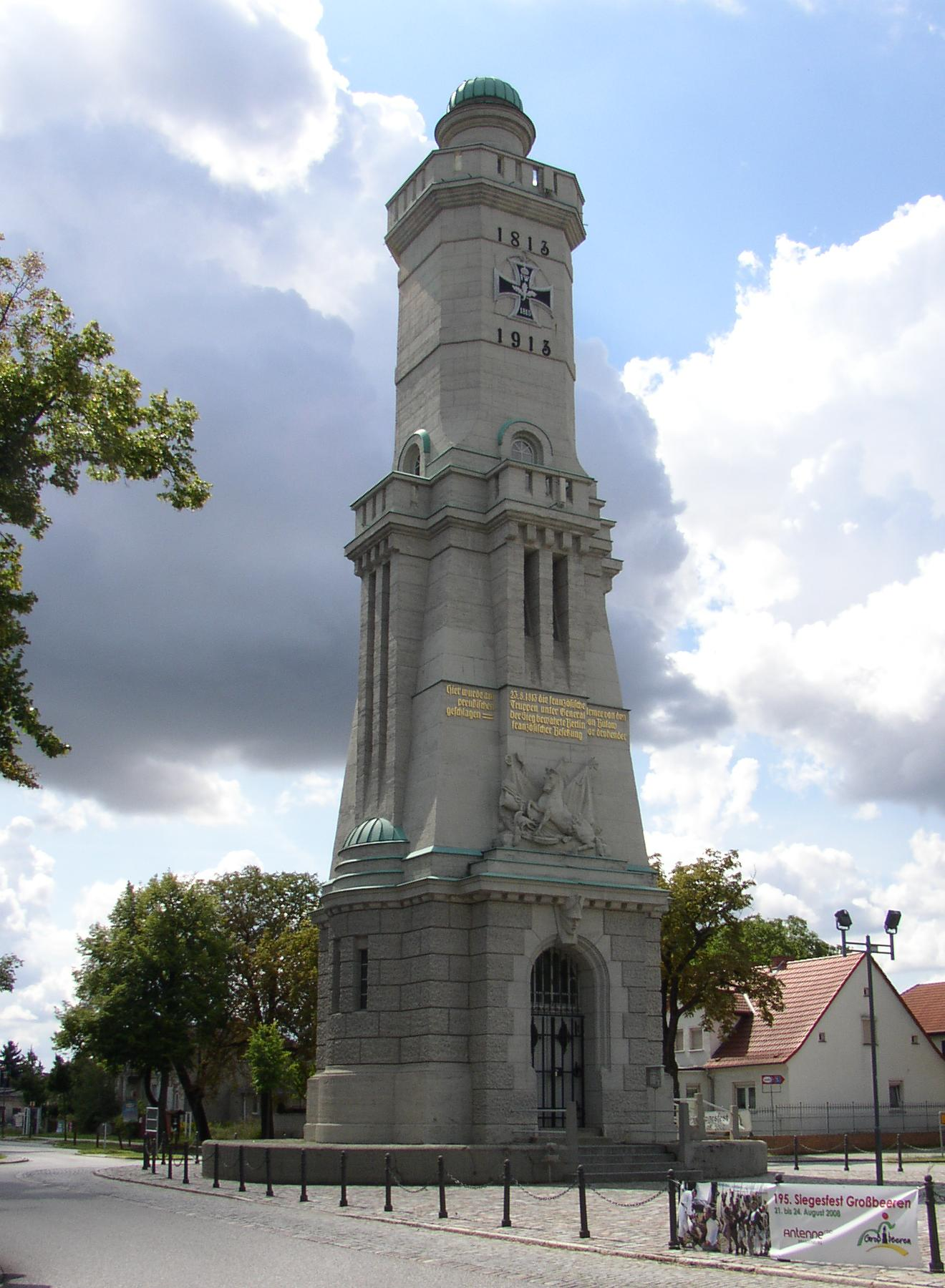
Großbeeren memorial tower

Großbeeren was first mentioned in a 1271 deed. It was devastated in the Thirty Years' War and again in 1760, when Russian and Habsburg troops in the course of the Seven Years' War burnt down the church and several houses.

On 23 August 1813 the Sixth Coalition under Crown Prince Charles John of Sweden and General Friedrich Wilhelm Freiherr von Bülow defeated three corps of the Imperial French Army under Marshal Nicolas Oudinot in their advance on Berlin at the Battle of Großbeeren. A memorial tower in the village centre was erected on the hundredth anniversary in 1913. Furthermore, a fieldstone pyramid from 1906 on a pasture west of Großbeeren is dedicated to General von Bülow.

In September 1942 the Gestapo established a labour camp in Großbeeren, where at least 1197 forced labourers from Belgium, Czechoslovakia, France, Poland, Nazi Germany and the Soviet Union were killed. Werner Seelenbinder was imprisoned here in 1943.

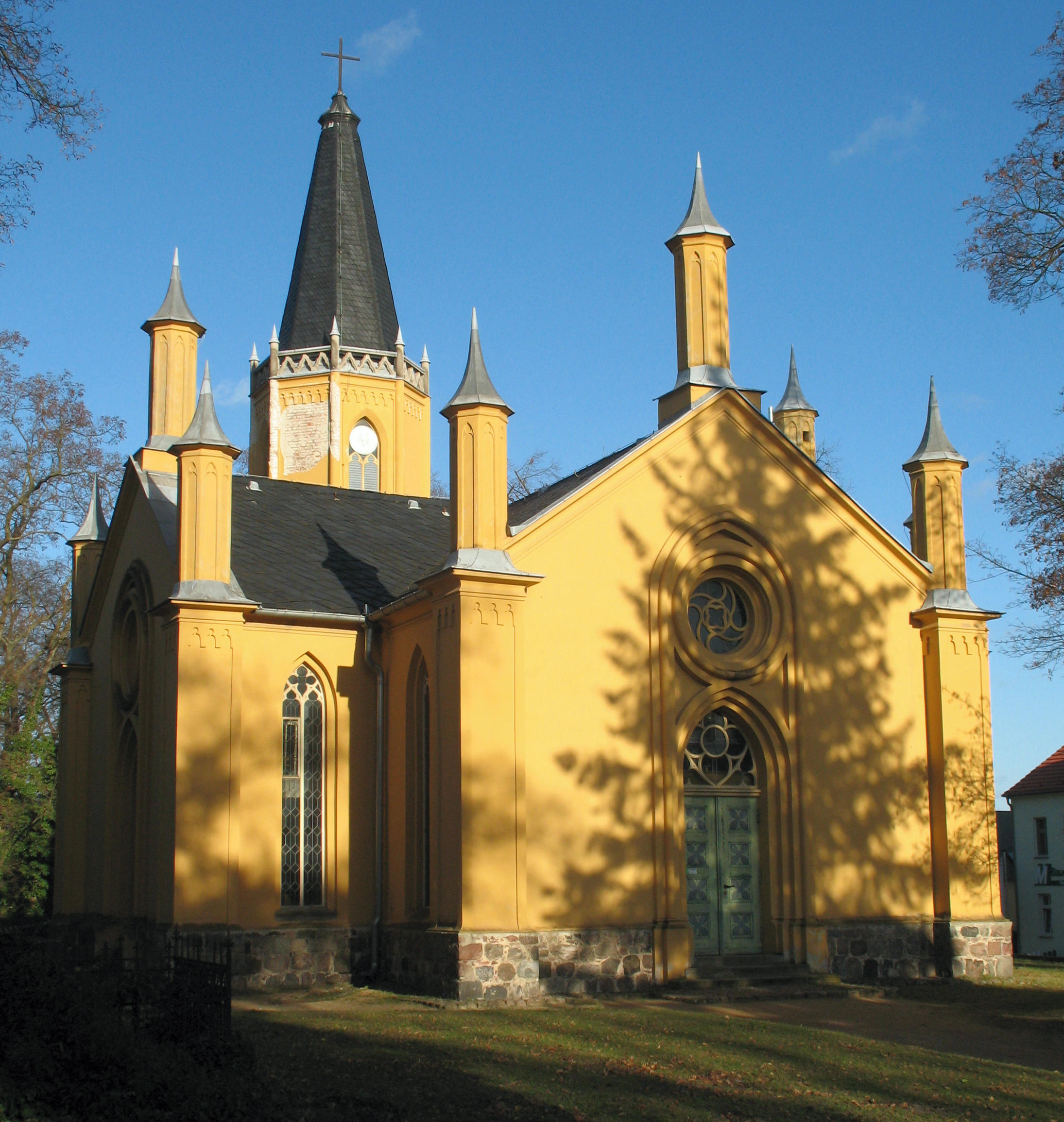
Church (by Schinkel)

Großbeeren shared its borders with the former West Berlin, and so during the period 1961-1990 it was separated from it by the Berlin Wall.

The municipality houses the Institute of Vegetable and Ornamental Crops (IGZ) of the Gottfried Wilhelm Leibniz Scientific Community.

== Transport ==
Großbeeren can be reached via the Bundesstraße 101 federal highway. It has also access to the Berlin–Halle railway. A large logistics complex serves for storage and distribution of goods addresses to Berlin.

== Personalities ==
- Johannes Reinhold (1897-1971), director of the Institute of Vegetable Production in Großbeeren
- Helmut Barthel (born 1953), politician (SPD), lives in Großbeeren
- Michael Richter (born 1954), politician (CDU) lives in Großbeeren
