= Siege of Tarragona (1813) =

1813 siege during the Peninsular War

- Part of the Peninsular War
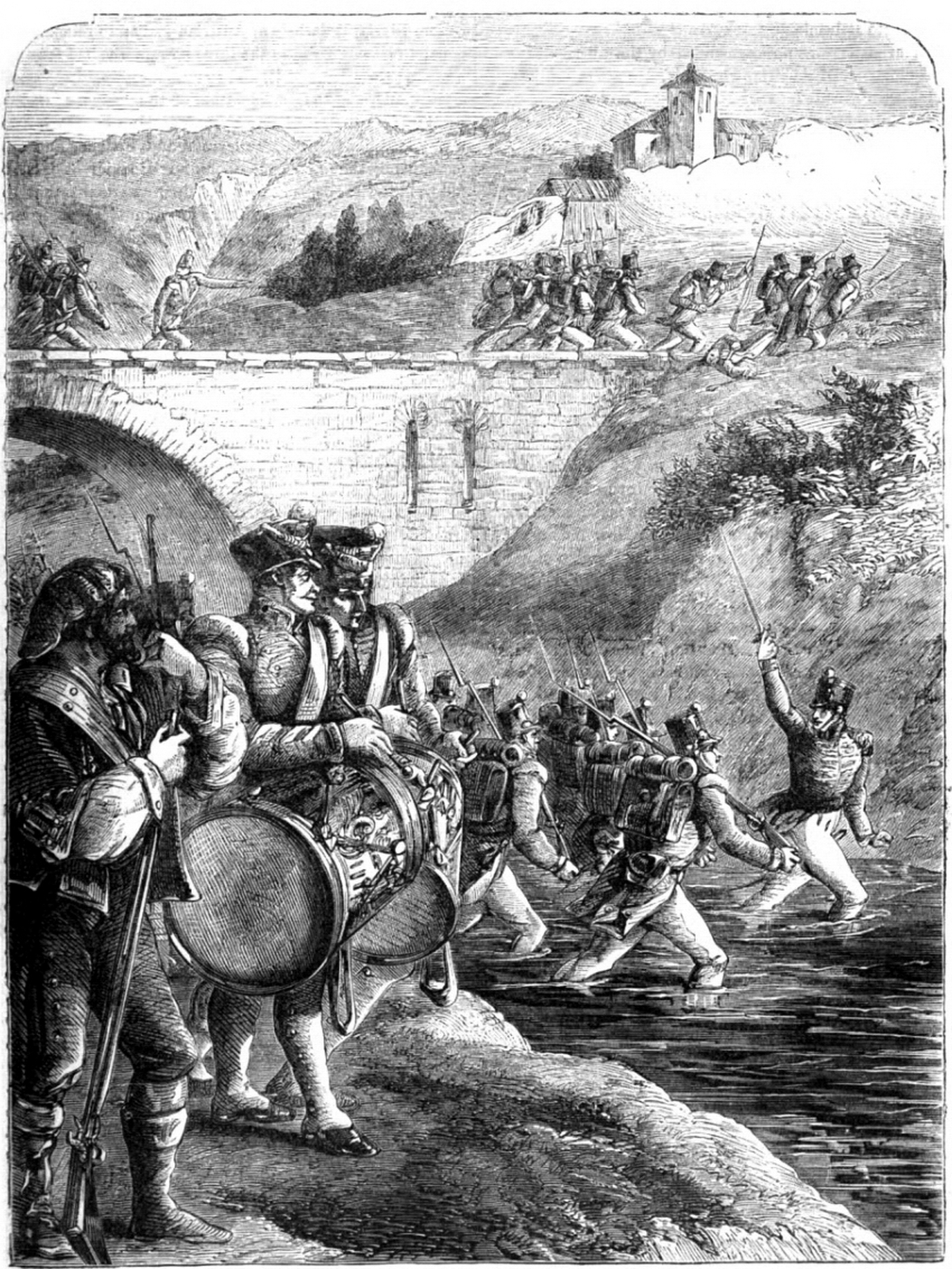
- British-Spanish forces mounting an assault on Tarragona, June 1813
Date	3–11 June 1813
Location	Tarragona, Catalonia, Spain 41.1156°N 1.2494°E
Result	Franco-Italian victory

Belligerents
France; Italy	United Kingdom; Spain; Sicily

Commanders and leaders
(France) Marshal Suchet (France) Maurice Mathieu (Kingdom of Italy (Napoleonic)) Antoine Bertoletti	(United Kingdom) John Murray (United Kingdom) Benjamin Hallowell (Spain) Francisco Copons

Strength
Garrison: 1,600; Relief: 14,000	23,000

Casualties and losses
98 dead or wounded	102 dead or wounded, 18 siege cannons

Peninsular War: Aragón Catalonia
current battle

In the siege of Tarragona (3–11 June 1813), an overwhelming Anglo-Allied force commanded by Lieutenant General John Murray, 8th Baronet, failed to capture the Spanish port of Tarragona from a small Franco-Italian garrison led by General of Brigade Antoine Marc Augustin Bertoletti. Murray was subsequently removed from command for his indecisive and contradictory leadership.

== Background ==
Murray's Anglo-Sicilian-Spanish army, based on Alicante, inflicted a sharp check on Marshal Louis Gabriel Suchet's corps at the Battle of Castalla in April. After this action, General Arthur Wellesley, Marquess of Wellington ordered Murray to attack Tarragona, which is on the east coast of Spain. The port is about 65 miles southwest of Barcelona. Wellington planned to launch his summer 1813 offensive against King Joseph Bonaparte's French armies. By attacking Tarragona, Wellington wished to prevent Suchet from reinforcing Joseph.

On 2 June Rear-Admiral Benjamin Hallowell Carew's squadron put Murray's 16,000 men ashore at Salou Bay, six miles south of Tarragona. They soon met General Francisco Copons' division of 7,000 Spanish soldiers. On 3 June the Allied army laid siege to the town.

== Forces ==
Murray organized his army into one Spanish and two British infantry divisions, some cavalry, 2 British and 1 Portuguese field artillery batteries, plus some unassigned units. General William Clinton's 1st Division was made up of the 1/58th Regiment of Foot and 2/67th Regiment of Foot, the 4th King's German Legion and 2 battalions of the Sicilian Estero (Foreign) Regiment. General John Mackenzie's 2nd Division was made up of the 1/10th Regiment of Foot, 1/27th Regiment of Foot and 1/81st Regiment of Foot, De Roll's Swiss and the 2nd Italian Regiment. The cavalry force included two squadrons each of the 20th Light Dragoons and the Brunswick Hussars. The it:Calabrian Free Corps and the 1st Italian Regiment were unbrigaded. Murray's 18 heavy siege guns were the same ones that Wellington used to breach the walls during the siege of Ciudad Rodrigo and at the Battle of Badajoz in 1812. Rufane Shaw Donkin served as Murray's chief-of-staff.

Bertoletti's garrison included a battalion each from the French 20th Line Infantry and the 7th Italian Infantry regiments, two companies of artillerymen and some French sailors. The defences had not been restored since Suchet had captured the town in the first siege of Tarragona in 1811. In any case, the 1,600 men were too few to man the outer walls, so Bertoletti abandoned the walls and pulled his men back into the old town. He left small garrisons in two outworks, the Bastion of San Carlos and Fort Royal.

== Siege ==
Copons and his division were sent to the north to block the road from Barcelona. A British force occupied a fort to the south at Balaguer. Instead of immediately storming the two weak outworks, Murray insisted on establishing breaching batteries. By 7 June Fort Royal lay helpless under the bombardment. Yet, Murray decided to wait until 11 June before mounting an assault on the outwork.

When he heard Tarragona was attacked, Suchet and 8,000 men began to march north from Valencia. From Barcelona, General of Division Charles Decaen sent General of Division Maurice Mathieu and 6,000 men southward. Suchet planned for the two columns to rendezvous at Reus, 10 miles inland from Tarragona.

Murray became increasingly anxious about the twin French threats. On 9 June he issued secret orders to withdraw from the siege. On 11 June he rode to Copons and found that Mathieu was approaching. Promising to reinforce Copons with British troops, he hastened back to his siege lines. Hearing fresh rumors that both Suchet and Mathieu were bearing down on him, Murray panicked. He abandoned the planned assault and ordered the stores to be sent back aboard ship. Late that night, Murray ordered that the heavy guns to be withdrawn at once. His chief gunner told him it was impossible to bring off the guns in less than 30 hours.

It was all unnecessary. Suchet heard of a Spanish threat to Valencia and retreated. Mathieu brushed with Copons' outposts, found he was facing a combined army of 23,000 men and fell back northward.

Meanwhile, Murray issued a flurry of often contradictory orders. These only added to the confusion and infuriated Hallowell. By the night of 12 June the entire force was taken on board the ships, leaving the 18 siege guns spiked and many stores left behind. Copons was advised to flee into the mountains. An amazed Bertoletti sent a messenger to Mathieu that the coast was clear.

Soon, Murray decided to land his army at Balaguer, which was accomplished on 15 June. He convinced Copons to support the second landing, which the Spanish general loyally did. Mathieu force-marched his troops into Tarragona on the following day. When Murray heard that French soldiers were at hand he immediately ordered that his army be re-embarked, to Hallowell's disgust. Copons was left in the lurch once more. On 18 June the Mediterranean Fleet hove over the horizon. Lord William Bentinck relieved Murray of command and the thwarted expedition sailed back to Alicante.

== Results ==
Aside from the 18 lost siege guns, the Anglo-Allies lost 15 killed, 82 wounded, and five missing. French losses were 13 killed and 85 wounded. The Tarragona fiasco did not affect Wellington's 1813 campaign, which ended in a decisive Anglo-Allied victory over King Joseph at the Battle of Vitoria on 21 June. In 1814, Murray was court-martialled for his conduct before Tarragona. He was acquitted of all charges except that of abandoning his guns without just cause, for which he was admonished by the court.

== Notes ==
Preceded by Battle of Bautzen (1813)	Napoleonic Wars; Siege of Tarragona (1813)	Succeeded by Battle of Luckau
