= Antoine Marc Augustin Bertoletti =

Antoine Marc Augustine Bertoletti
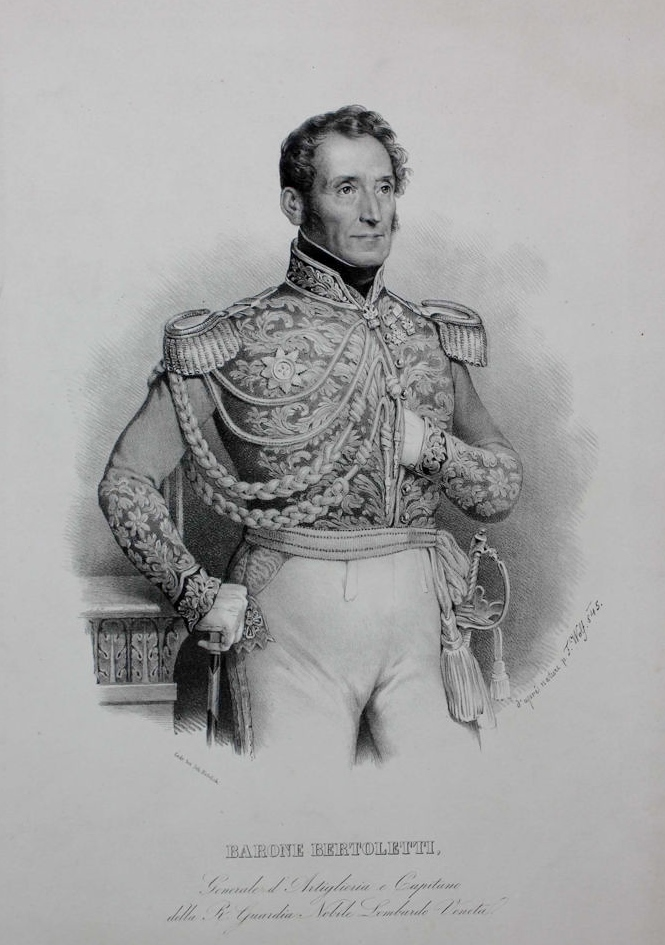
- Lieutenant General Antoine Marc Augustin Bertoletti
- Born: 28 August 1775; Milan
- Died: 6 March 1846 (aged 70); Milan (aged 71)
- Military career
- Allegiance: Italy (1805–1813); Habsburg monarchy
- Rank: General of brigade (Italy); Feldzeugmeister (Habsburg monarchy)
- Conflicts: Napoleonic Wars; War of the Fifth Coalition; Battle of Raab; Battle of Wagram; Peninsular War

Field Marshal Antonio Marco Agostino Bertoletti (28 August 1775 – 6 March 1846), better known as Antoine Marc Augustin Bertoletti, was an Italian army officer who served in the Napoleonic Wars. He initially served in the army of the pro-French Kingdom of Italy until switching sides and joining the Austrian Army.

== Military career ==
During the War of the Fifth Coalition, Bertoletti served in the Italian division under the command of Eugène de Beauharnais, the Viceroy of Italy. At the outbreak of war, he led a brigade in Achille Fontanelli's Division. Later, Jean Rusca took command of the division, which missed the Battle of Piave River. Bertoletti led his brigade in an action at Klagenfurt on 8 June and at Papa, Hungary on 12 June, as well as the major Battle of Raab on 14 June. During the Battle of Wagram, his brigade defended Klagenfurt on Eugene's line of communications.

In June 1813, Bertoletti defended Tarragona with 1,600 soldiers against British Lieutenant-General John Murray's 16,000-man army. Realising he could not hope to hold the outer walls with his small Franco-Italian garrison, he pulled back into the inner defences and two outworks. Ultimately, Murray abandoned the siege and 18 heavy cannon when he heard that two French relief columns were due to arrive. When Murray's troops withdrew, Bertoletti alertly called for help from the nearest French column, which soon marched into the fortress. At the news that French reinforcements were nearby, Murray gave up a second plan to capture Tarragona.

After the Napoleonic Wars, Bertoletti served the Austrian crown as Generalmajor (July 1814), Feldmarschalleutnant (1830) and Feldzeugmeister (1845). He died in Vienna.

The Arc de Triomphe bears the inscription BERTOLETTI on the 37th column.

== Sources ==
- Bowden, Scotty & Tarbox, Charlie. Armies on the Danube 1809. Arlington, Texas: Empire Games Press, 1980.
- Glover, Michael. The Peninsular War 1807-1814. London: Penguin, 2001. ISBN 0-14-139041-7
- Smith, Digby. The Napoleonic Wars Data Book. London: Greenhill, 1998. ISBN 1-85367-276-9
