= Truce of Pläswitz =

Armistice during the Napoleonic Wars

Coordinates: 50.0472°N 16.5147°E

The Truce or Armistice of Pläswitz was a nine-week armistice during the Napoleonic Wars, agreed between Napoleon I of France and the Allies on 4 June 1813 (the same day as the Battle of Luckau was being fought elsewhere). It was proposed by Metternich during the retreat of the main Allied army into Silesia after Bautzen, seconded by Napoleon (keen as he was to buy time to strengthen his cavalry, rest his army, intimidate Austria by bringing the Army of Italy up to Laibach and negotiate a separate peace with Russia) and keenly accepted by the Allies (thus buying time to woo Austrian support, bring in further British funding and rest the exhausted Imperial Russian Army). The Truce conceded all of Saxony to Napoleon, in return for territory along the Oder, and was initially scheduled to end on 10 July, but later extended to 10 August.

In the time the Truce bought, the Landwehr was mobilised and Metternich finalised the Treaty of Reichenbach on 27 June, agreeing that Austria would join the Allies should Napoleon fail to meet certain conditions by a specific day. He failed to meet those conditions, the Truce was allowed to lapse without renewal, and Austria declared war on 12 August. Napoleon later described the armistice as the greatest mistake of his life.
