= Battle of Bautzen (1813) =

Battle during the War of the Sixth Coalition

- Part of the German campaign of the Sixth Coalition
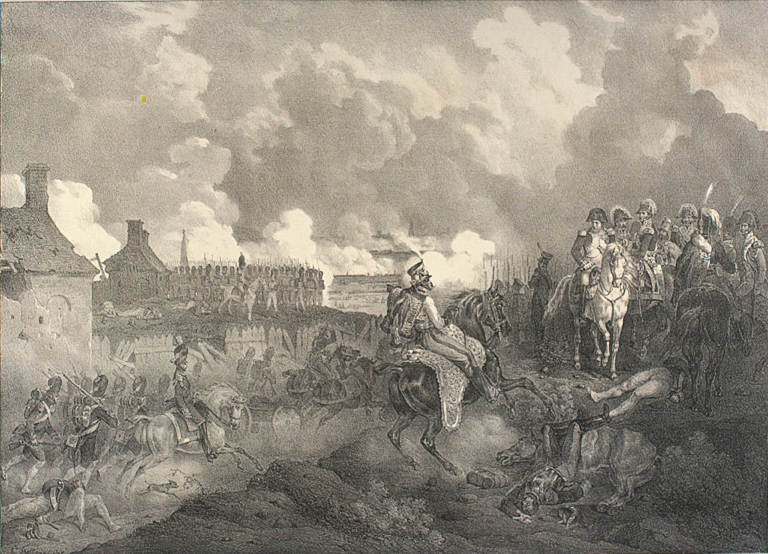
- Napoleon on white horse surrounded by his officers, receives a messenger.
Date	20–21 May 1813
Location	Bautzen, Kingdom of Saxony 51°11′00″N 14°25′00″E
Result	French victory

Belligerents
France	Russia; Prussia

Commanders and leaders
(First French Empire) Napoleon I; (First French Empire) Michel Ney; (First French Empire) Jean-de-Dieu Soult; (First French Empire) Auguste de Marmont; (First French Empire) Édouard Mortier; (First French Empire) Henri Gatien Bertrand; (First French Empire) Jacques MacDonald; (First French Empire) Pierre Augereau; (First French Empire) Nicolas Oudinot; (First French Empire) Géraud Duroc; (First French Empire) Horace Sébastiani; (First French Empire) Jacques Lauriston	(Russian Empire) Alexander I; (Russian Empire) Peter Wittgenstein; (Russian Empire) Barclay de Tolly; (Russian Empire) Mikhail Miloradovich; (Russian Empire) Grand Duke Konstantin; (Russian Empire) Levin August von Bennigsen; (Kingdom of Prussia) Gebhard von Blücher; (Kingdom of Prussia) Frederick William III; (Kingdom of Prussia) Ludwig Yorck von Wartenburg; (Kingdom of Prussia) Friedrich von Kleist

Strength
100,000–200,000	96,000–97,000

Casualties and losses
20,000–25,000	11,000–20,000
- Location within Europe

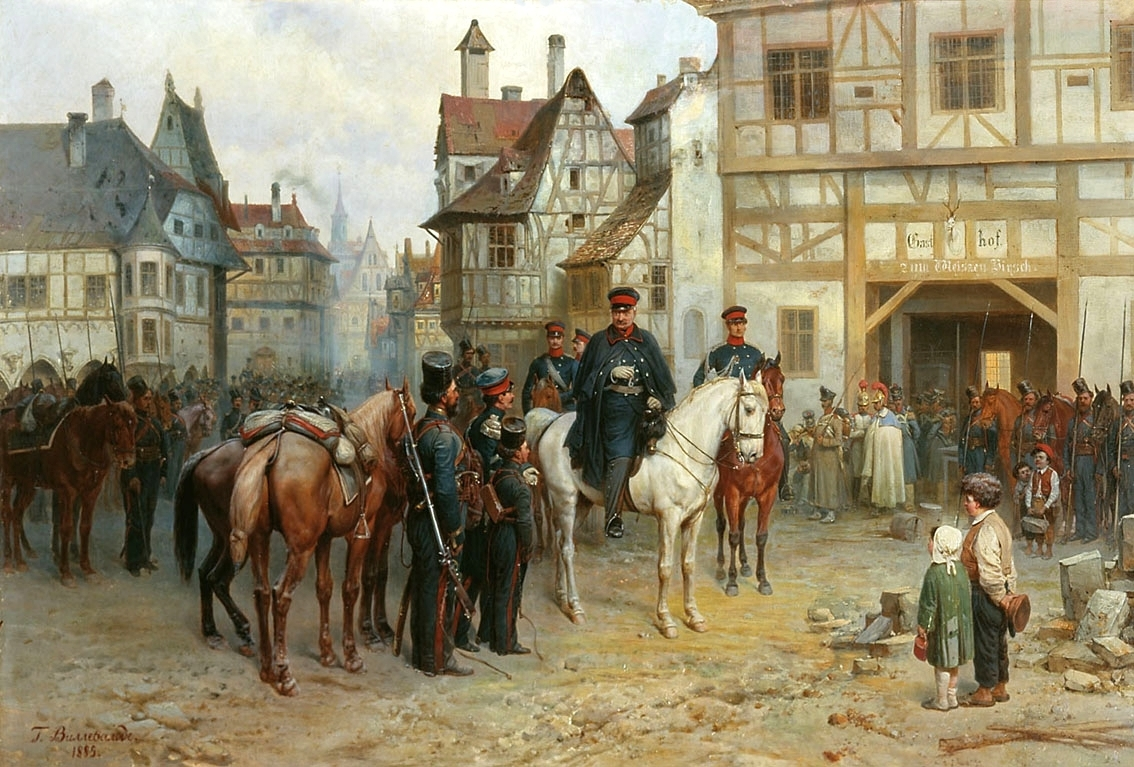
Gebhard Leberecht von Blücher in Bautzen, 1813

War of the Sixth Coalition:
German campaign
current battle
Napoleon in command
Napoleon not in command

In the Battle of Bautzen (20–21 May 1813), a combined Prusso-Russian army, retreating after their defeat at Lützen and massively outnumbered, was pushed back by Napoleon but escaped destruction. Some sources claim that Marshal Michel Ney failed to block their retreat. The Prussians were led by General Gebhard Leberecht von Blücher, and the Russians by General Peter Wittgenstein.

== Prelude ==
The Prusso-Russian army was in a full retreat following their defeat at the Battle of Lützen. Finally, generals Wittgenstein and Blücher were ordered to stop at Bautzen by Tsar Alexander I and King Frederick William III. The Russo-Prussian army was nearly 96,000 strong, but Napoleon had 144,000. Wittgenstein formed two strong defensive lines east of the River Spree, with the first holding strongpoints in villages and along hills and the second holding the bridges behind a river bend. Their left flank was anchored by the town of Bautzen and their right by a number of lakes.

Napoleon had planned to pin down his enemies to their lines on the first day and then trap them with Marshal Michel Ney's troops the following day when they arrived. However, due to faulty reconnaissance, he became concerned that the Prusso-Russians had more soldiers and held stronger positions than they actually did. So Napoleon then decided he would not set up his trap until they had been softened up.

== Battle ==
After an intense bombardment by the grande batterie of Napoleon's artillery that started about noon and hours of heated fighting, the French overpowered the first defensive lines and seized the town of Bautzen. The Prusso-Russians fell back in good order. By nightfall, the French were positioning to cut the allies off from their line of retreat but the Coalition was aware of Ney's approach to their right flank. But Marshal Ney became confused, and his faulty positioning left the door open for the Allies to escape.

Fighting on the following day, 21 May, was again hard and after several hours of setbacks, renewed French attacks began to gain momentum. But these assaults were only intended to fix the allies in place so they could be cut off and enveloped. Once again, Marshal Ney became distracted and decided to seize the village of Preititz, and thus lost sight of the strategic importance of cutting off the allies.

The Russo-Prussian army was being pushed back and at 4:00pm, the Tsar realized the threat that Ney posed on his right and that the battle was lost and issued orders for a general retreat. Without Ney's forces to seal them in, however, they again escaped the crushing defeat Napoleon had hoped for. Losses on both sides totaled around 20,000. But some other sources (e.g. Dr Stubner) also say that the losses on French side were significantly higher because of their aggressive attack tactics which failed to cut off the allies from their lines and the allies in fact only lost 11,000–14,000. The French victory at Bautzen is therefore often called a Pyrrhic victory. Given his numerical superiority, the outcome was a missed opportunity for Napoleon.

== Aftermath ==
Although another battle victory for the French, Bautzen was not the decisive, strategic result that Napoleon had wanted. Ney's failure to cut the line of retreat robbed the French of complete victory. Once more, Napoleon had to settle for a narrow and costly victory with over 20,000 French casualties. To make matters worse, during the battle, Napoleon's close friend and Grand Marshal of the Palace, General Geraud Duroc, was mortally wounded by a cannonball the day after the battle and died. Following Bautzen, Napoleon agreed to a nine-week truce with the Coalition, requested by the Allies on 2 June 1813. The Armistice of Pläswitz was signed on 4 June, and lasted until 20 July but was later extended to 10 August. On the same 4 June the Battle of Luckau was fought. Napoleon hoped to gather more troops, especially cavalry, and better train his new army, but the allies were not idle and mobilised better prepared forces. After hostilities were resumed, the Austrians joined the ranks of the allies. It is reported that Napoleon later (on Saint Helena) said that his agreement to that truce was a bad mistake because the break was of much more use to the allies than to him.

== Notes ==
Preceded by Battle of Lützen (1813)	Napoleonic Wars; Battle of Bautzen (1813)	Succeeded by Siege of Tarragona (1813)
