= History of the Jews in Finland =

Finnish Jews Suomen juutalaiset Finländska judar יהודים פיניים
- Finland (dark green) and its location in the European Union (light green)

Total population
- 1,650

Regions with significant populations
- Helsinki (80% of the Finnish Jewish community), Turku (13%), Tampere (3%)

Languages
- Finnish, Swedish, Hebrew, Yiddish, German, Russian

Religion
- Judaism

Related ethnic groups
- Ashkenazi Jews: notably Russian Jews, Ukrainian Jews, and others

The history of the Jews in Finland goes back to the late 18th century. Many of the first Jews to arrive were nineteenth-century Russian soldiers known as cantonists who stayed in Finland after their military service ended. Jews were granted full civil rights as Finnish citizens in 1918, making Finland one of the last European countries to do so.

During World War II, Finland's position as a co-belligerent with Nazi Germany against the Soviet Union presented a challenge for Finnish Jews who fought in the Finnish army alongside the Nazis. Finnish Jews were protected by Finnish authorities despite German pressure, but eight Austrian Jewish refugees were deported to Germany in 1942, a move that was considered a national scandal. The Finnish government apologized for the extradition in 2000.

The two synagogues in active use today in Finland were built by Jewish congregations in Helsinki and Turku in 1906 and 1912, respectively. The Vyborg Synagogue (built 1910–1911) was destroyed by Russian air bombings on 30 November 1939, the first day of the Winter War.

Today, Finland is home to around 1,800 Jews, of which 1,400 live in the Greater Helsinki area and 200 in Turku. Finnish and Swedish are the most common mother tongues of Jews in Finland, and many also speak Yiddish, German, Russian or Hebrew. Since data collection began in 2008, incidents of antisemitism have been on the rise in Finland. The number of incidents are likely under-reported, as Finland does not have a systematic method for recording specific forms of hate speech that incite violence or hatred.

== History until 1809 ==
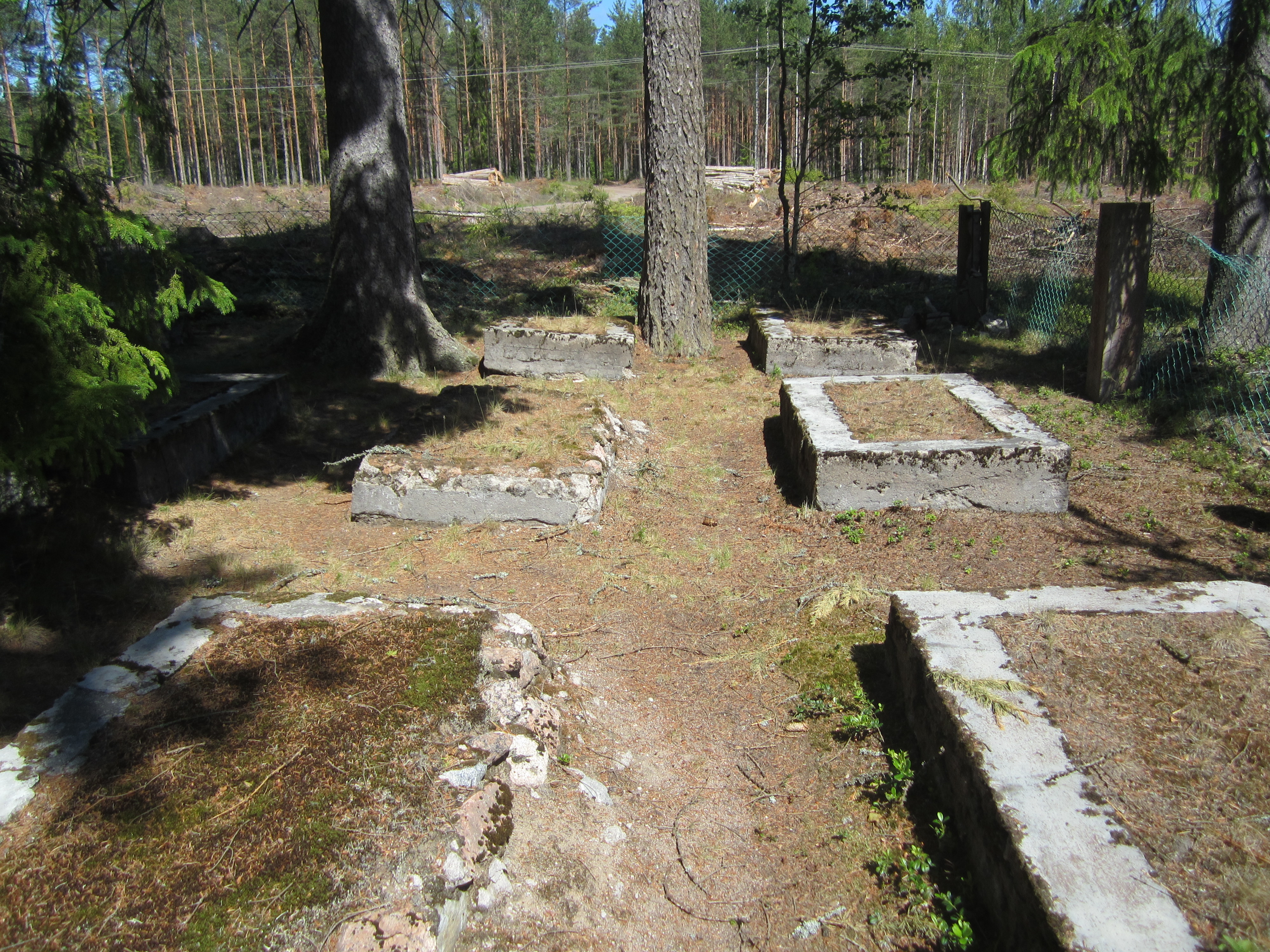
Graves of the Jewish soldiers who served in the army of the Russian Empire, located next to the Eastern Orthodox cemetery in Hamina.

Before Finland was annexed by Russia in 1809, it was a part of the Swedish realm. Swedish laws prohibited Jews from settling in the kingdom, a restriction that stemmed from the 1593 Uppsala Synod, which allowed only Lutheranism to be practiced in Sweden. The 1686 Church Law went even further, requiring Jews and other non-Christians to convert before being allowed to settle. Economic needs occasionally made room for exemptions, and the 1782 Judereglementet laws allowed wealthy Jews to settle in three Swedish cities – all of which fell outside the boundaries of modern-day Finland. In 1806, King Gustav IV Adolf further tightened policy by banning Jewish immigration altogether. As a result, no Jews officially resided in Finland before the 19th century, although some, like Aaron Isaac, conducted business in the province.

An exception to this general rule was Old Finland, the southeastern parts of Finland ceded to Russia in the 18th century. Under Russian administration, Jews were allowed to settle legally in these areas. The earliest family to arrive was the Weikaim family, who arrived in Hamina (Fredrikshamn) from Daugavpils (then part of the Russian Empire) in 1799, and moved to Viipuri (Vyborg) in 1815. The Jews in Finland formed a small community involved in trades like tinsmithing and construction. Some of the early settlers converted to Christianity to facilitate their residence.

== Grand Duchy of Finland ==
In 1809, Finland was ceded to the Russian Empire as an autonomous Grand Duchy. The Russian emperor confirmed the continued application of Swedish laws, including the ban on Jewish settlement. Ambiguities arose due to the presence of Jews already living legally in Old Finland. Some provincial governors in the rest of Finland also used their discretion to grant settlement permits to Jewish individuals.

Despite the legal difficulties, Russian Jews established themselves in Finland as tradesmen and craftsmen during the period of autonomy from 1809 to 1917, although their number remained small. In 1872, they numbered about 700 individuals, half of whom lived in Helsinki and the other half in Turku (Åbo) and Viipuri. The Jews who inhabited Finland were mostly former soldiers from the Imperial Russian army. These cantonists were forced into the Russian army in childhood and were required to serve at least 25 years. After completing their service, some chose to remain in the regions where they had been stationed. In 1858, a limited exemption was granted to retired Jewish soldiers and their families to allow them to remain in Finland.

Finnish authorities often interpreted Jewish regulations more restrictively than their Russian counterparts, emphasizing Swedish-era legislation in order to underscore Finland's legal autonomy. When Jewish civil rights were expanded in Russia under Alexander II, Finland retained more conservative policies. In 1886, the Finnish Senate replaced the 1858 settlement decree with a system of six-month residence permits. The move paralleled Russian efforts under Alexander III and Nicholas I to restrict Jewish mobility and rights. Regulations from 1869 also restricted their right to work, and Jews typically earned a living selling second-hand clothes.

In 1888, the Finnish authorities took an even harsher step by expelling Jewish families from certain regions. The first expulsion order targeted 12 Jewish families in Turku, and 34 families in Viipuri were also ordered to leave. This did not drastically change the number of Jews residing in Finland. Some of the expelled families relocated to the United States, while others moved to Palestine.

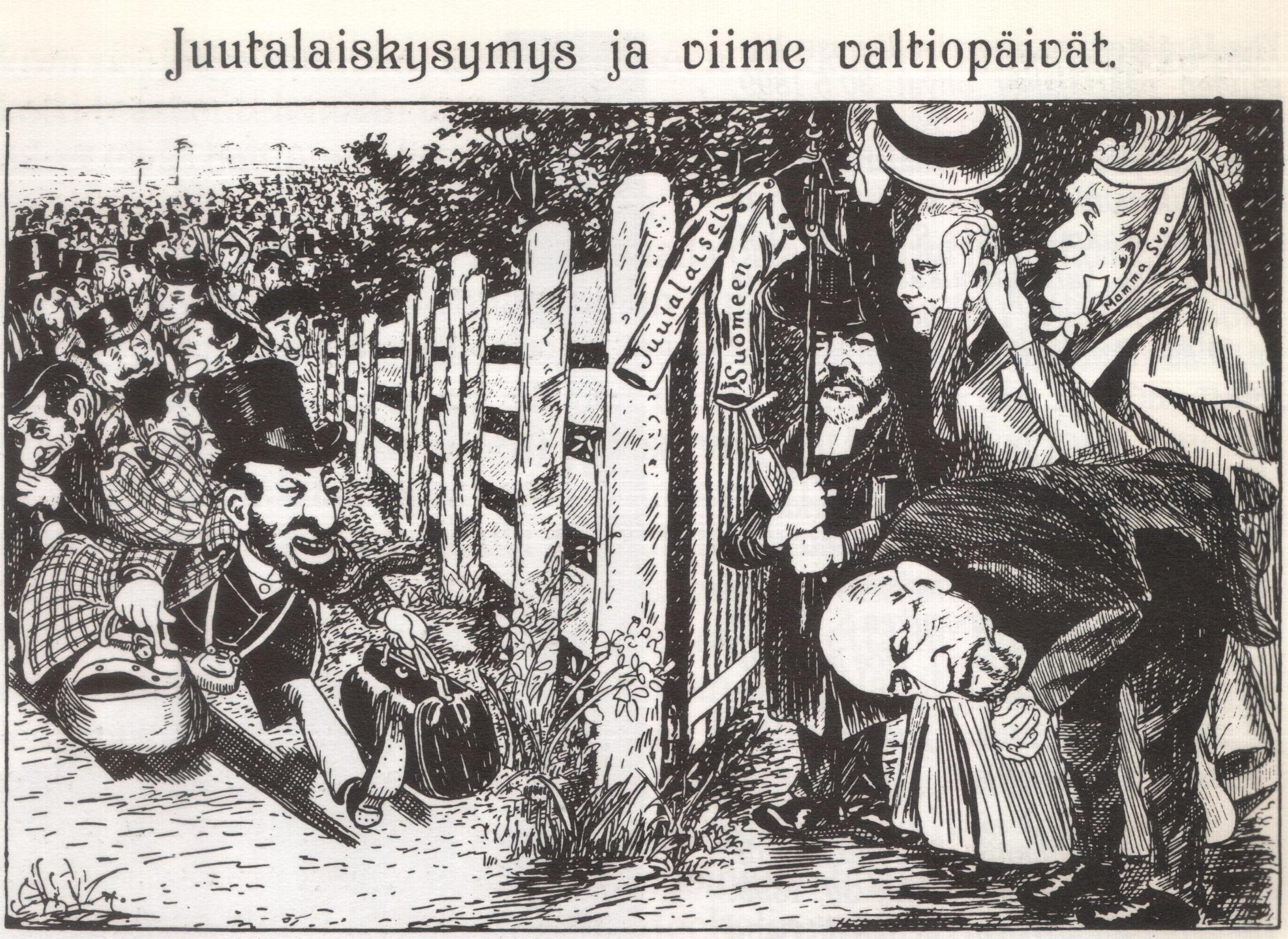
An 1897 cartoon warning against a flood of Jewish immigration if discriminatory laws were repealed.

Public debate over Jewish rights intensified in the late 19th century. Liberal voices, especially in the Swedish-language press, supported equal rights, while Finnish-language outlets often expressed concern over a potential influx of impoverished Eastern Jews. In 1872, Leo Mechelin proposed granting Jews full civil rights in the Diet of Finland. His initiative was rejected, particularly by the clerical estate, which feared mass immigration and cultural disruption. Jews were granted full rights as Finnish citizens after Finland had declared independence in 1917. The law came into force in January 1918, making Finland one of the last countries in Europe to grant Jews equal citizenship.

Rabbi Naftali Zvi Amsterdam, one of the foremost disciples of Rabbi Yisrael Salanter and the Mussar Movement, served as chief rabbi of Helsinki under Rabbi Yisrael's instruction from 1867 to 1875.

Jewish youths in Helsinki founded the sports association IK Stjärnan (later Makkabi Helsinki) in 1906, making it the oldest still-operating Jewish sports club in the world with an uninterrupted history.

== World War II ==
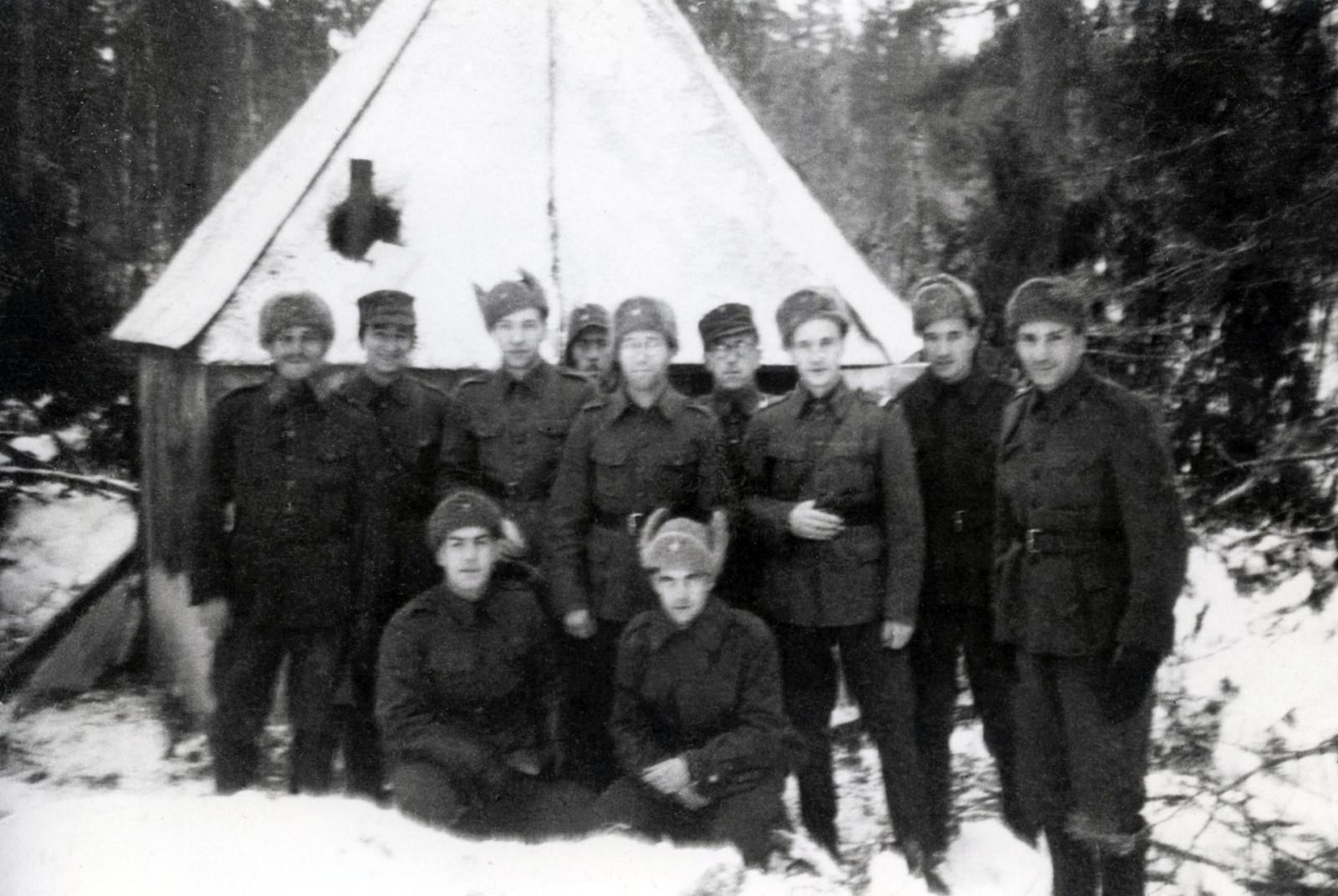
A Finnish field synagogue with soldiers at the Continuation War.

Finland's involvement in World War II began during the Winter War (30 November 1939 – 13 March 1940), the Soviet Union's invasion of Finland. Finnish Jews evacuated Finnish Karelia alongside other locals. The Vyborg Synagogue was destroyed by air bombings within the first few days of the war.

Finland resumed fighting the Soviet Union in the Continuation War (1941 – 1944), whose onset was timed to coincide with Germany's launch of Operation Barbarossa. This resulted in Finland fighting alongside Nazi Germany. 327 Finnish Jews fought for Finland during the war, including 242 rank-and-file soldiers, 52 non-commissioned officers, 18 officers, and 15 medical officers. 21 Jews served in the women's auxiliary Lotta Svärd. In total, 15 Finnish Jews were killed in action in the Winter War, and eight were killed in the Continuation War.

As Finland's wartime operations were supported by substantial numbers of German forces, the Finnish front had a field synagogue operating in the presence of Nazi troops. Jewish soldiers were granted leave on Saturdays and Jewish holidays. Finnish Jewish soldiers later participated in the Lapland War against Germany.

In November 1942, eight Jewish Austrian refugees (along with 19 others) were deported to Nazi Germany after the head of the Finnish police agreed to turn them over. Seven of the Jews were murdered immediately. According to author Martin Gilbert, these eight were: Georg Kollman; Frans Olof Kollman; Frans Kollman's mother; Hans Eduard Szubilski; Henrich Huppert; Kurt Huppert; Hans Robert Martin Korn, who had been a volunteer in the Winter War; and an unknown individual. When Finnish media reported the news, it caused a national scandal, and ministers resigned in protest. After protests by Lutheran ministers, an Archbishop, and the Social Democratic Party, no more foreign Jewish refugees were deported from Finland. In 2000, Finnish Prime Minister Paavo Lipponen issued an official apology for the extradition of the eight Jewish refugees.

Approximately 500 Jewish refugees arrived in Finland during World War II, although about 350 moved on to other countries, including about 160 who were transferred to neutral Sweden for safety reasons on the direct orders of Finnish Army commander Marshal Carl Gustaf Emil Mannerheim. About 40 of the remaining Jewish refugees were forced into compulsory labor service in Salla in Lapland in March 1942. The refugees were moved to Kemijärvi in June and eventually to Suursaari Island in the Gulf of Finland. Although Heinrich Himmler visited Finland twice to try to persuade the authorities to hand over the Jewish population, he was unsuccessful.

In 1942, an exchange of Soviet prisoners of war (POWs) took place between Finland and Germany. Approximately 2,600–2,800 Soviet POWs of various nationalities then held by Finland were exchanged for 2,100 Soviet POWs of Baltic Finnic nationalities (Finnish, Karelian, Ingrian, or Estonian) held by Germany, who might have volunteered in the Finnish army. About 2,000 of the POWs handed over by Finland joined the Wehrmacht. Among the rest, there were about 500 people (mainly Soviet political officers) who were considered politically dangerous in Finland. This latter group most likely perished in concentration camps or were executed following guidelines set by the Commissar Order. 47 Jews appear on the list of those extradited, although religion was not a determining factor in extradition.

Jews with Finnish citizenship were protected during the war. Late in the conflict, Germany's ambassador to Helsinki Wipert von Blücher concluded in a report to Hitler that Finns would not endanger their citizens of Jewish origin in any situation.

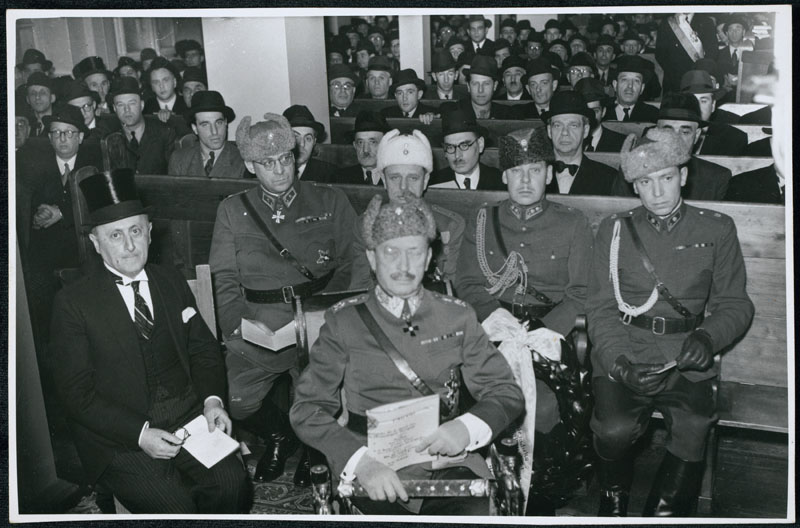
Memorial ceremony for Jewish soldiers who fell in World War II, Helsinki, Finland

Three Finnish Jews were offered the Iron Cross for their wartime service: Leo Skurnik, Salomon Klass, and Dina Poljakoff. Major Leo Skurnik, a district medical officer in the Finnish Army, organized an evacuation of a German field hospital when it came under Soviet shelling. More than 600 patients, including SS soldiers, were evacuated. Captain Salomon Klass, also of the Finnish Army, led a Finnish unit that rescued a German company from encirclement by the Soviets. Dina Poljakoff, a member of Lotta Svärd, the Finnish women's auxiliary service, was a nursing assistant who helped tend to German wounded and came to be greatly admired by her patients. All three refused the award.

The then-President of Finland, Marshal Mannerheim, attended the memorial service for fallen Finnish Jews at the Helsinki Synagogue on 6 December 1944.

== After World War II ==
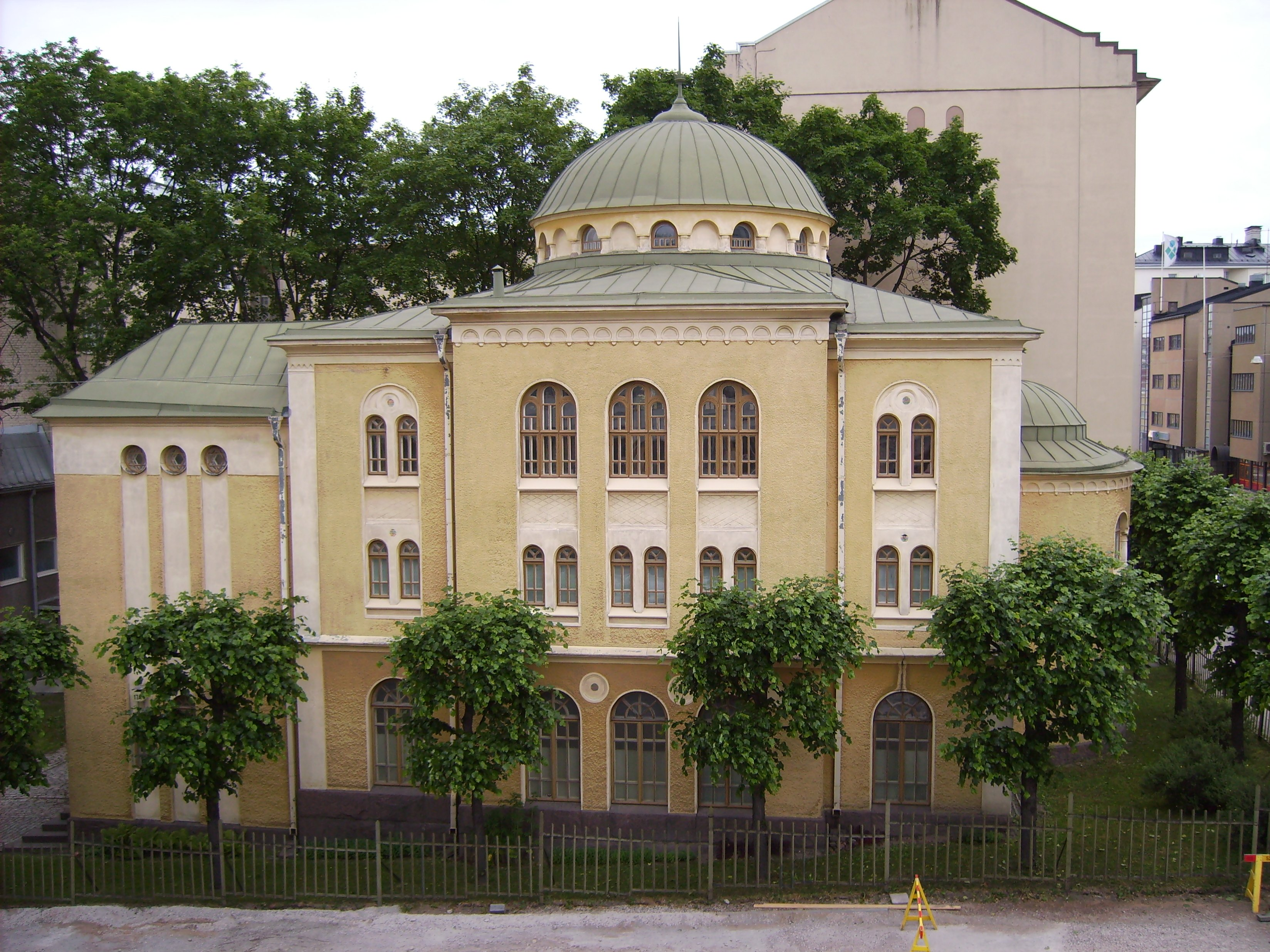
The synagogue of Turku

During the 1948 Arab–Israeli War, about 28 Finnish Jews, mostly Finnish Army veterans, fought for the State of Israel. After Israel's establishment, Finland had a high rate of immigration to Israel (known as "aliyah"), which led to a shrinking Jewish population. The community was partly revitalized when some Soviet Jews immigrated to Finland following the collapse of the Soviet Union.

As of 2020, the number of Jews in Finland was approximately 1,800, of whom 1,400 lived in Helsinki, about 200 in Turku, and about 50 in Tampere. Jews are well integrated into Finnish society and are represented in nearly all sectors. Most Finnish Jews are corporate employees or self-employed professionals.

Most Finnish Jews speak Finnish or Swedish as their mother tongue. Yiddish, German, Russian, and Hebrew are also spoken in the community. The Jews, like Finland's other traditional minorities as well as immigrant groups, are represented on the Advisory Board for Ethnic Relations.

There are two synagogues still standing in Finland: one in Helsinki and one in Turku. Helsinki also has a Jewish day school, which serves about 110 students (many of whom are the children of Israelis working in Finland); and a Chabad Lubavitch rabbi is based in the city.

Tampere previously had an organized Jewish community, but it stopped functioning in 1981. The other two cities continue to run their community organizations. There are also some Reform Jewish movements in Finland today.

=== Antisemitism ===
Antisemitic incident figures, 2008–2013

Historically, antisemitic hate crimes have been rare, and the Jewish community has been relatively safe. However, there have been some antisemitic crimes reported in the last decade; the most common types include defamation, verbal threats, and damage to property.

In 2011, Ben Zyskowicz, the first Finnish Jewish parliamentarian, was assaulted by a man shouting antisemitic slurs. Four years later, a few campaign advertisements containing Zyskowicz's picture were sprayed with swastikas in Helsinki. In 2023, Zyskowicz was attacked by a man who shouted insults about NATO, Jews and immigrants.

In 2015 the Fundamental Rights Agency published its annual overview of data on antisemitism available in the European Union, including information from a report by the Police College of Finland. The semi-frequent report covers religiously motivated hate crimes, including antisemitic crimes. The most recently-documented data is from 2013, when most of the incidents (six out of eleven) concerned verbal threats or harassments.

In May 2024, the European Jewish Congress prepared a report titled “Experiences and Views of Antisemitism in Finland – A Report on Discrimination and Hate Crime Targeting Jews" to investigate the rising levels of antisemitism in Finland. The survey respondents consisted of persons over the age of 16 who live in Finland and identify as Jewish. The report was prepared by researchers at the Polin Institute in collaboration with Åbo Akademi University and the Finnish Ministry of Justice. According to the report, over 80% of respondents believed that antisemitism has increased in the past 5 years, while over 70% of respondents stated that Finnish people blame Jewish people for the actions of the Israeli government.

==== Holocaust denial ====
Holocaust denial started in Finland almost immediately after the war, with many Finns who had been involved in the far-right and Nazi movements publishing articles questioning the Holocaust. Prominent early Finnish Holocaust deniers include professor C. A. J. Gadolin, CEO Carl-Gustaf Herlitz, architech Carl O. Nordling and ambassador Teo Snellman. In early 1970s, a Finnish translation of a pamphlet denying the Holocaust written by Vera Oredsson was distributed in Finland. Pekka Siitoin's Patriotic Popular Front started distributing a Finnish translation of Richard Harwood's Did Six Million Really Die? in 1976.

In the late 1980 and early 1990s, the newspaper Uusi Suunta published by the National Radical Party wrote how the supposed Jewish owned media maligned fascism with Holocaust "sob stories" that "have never been proven" to undermine the nationalist movement. One issue of Uusi Suunta stated that "The horrors of the concentration camps, that are not true by half, have been tied to the nationalist movement regardless of nationality." In the 1990s the party secretary of the National Democratic Party Olavi Koskela said that "the unbelievable Holocaust lies" enable the Jewish rulership over multicultural, multiracial and multilingual society. Finland - Fatherland's newspaper Kansallinen Rintama made similar arguments.

Antisemitism has experienced a resurgence after the Cold War, both in the internet and real life. Medical Licentiate Vesa-Ilkka Laurio wrote a blog frequently denying the Holocaust and criticizing democracy from a Christian fundamentalist perspective. Swedenborgian Nova Hierosolyma society's Uusi Jerusalem website also publishes Holocaust denial material, an article written by Erkki Kivilohkare claiming only 100,000 Jews died in the Holocaust. Another Swedenborgian fundamentalist Markku Juutinen has also denied holocaust in the Kumouksen ääni magazine.

In 2013, the newspaper Magneettimedia and its editor-in-chief, department store tycoon Juha Kärkkäinen, were convicted of agitation against a population group in connection with antisemitic content published in the newspaper. Originally launched as a customer and advertising paper, Magneettimedia was distributed to hundreds of thousands of households through the mail and the Kärkkäinen department store chain. It combined alternative health content and conspiracy theories with increasingly explicit antisemitic material. The newspaper published articles denying the Holocaust and articles such as "Zionist terrorism" and "CNN, Goldman Sachs and Zionist Control" translated from David Duke. Following the conviction, Juha Kärkkäinen withdrew from the publication, and the newspaper continued as an online publication under the control of the association Pohjoinen Perinne, whose leadership has been linked to the neo-Nazi Nordic Resistance Movement. Members of the movement have also distributed Holocaust-denial material in schools. Other alternative media sites, including MV-media and Verkkomedia, are known for publishing articles denying the Holocaust.

Far-right Finns Party General Secretary Olli Immonen has also multiple times shared a blog criticizing the "Holocaust-religion". The Finns Party leader Jussi Halla-aho also referred to Holocaust as "holohoax". Pseudonymous Thomas Dalton who is a prolific author of Holocaust denial books and has republished On the Jews and Their Lies and The Protocols of the Elders of Zion is suspected of being a researcher in University of Helsinki according to Demokraatti.

== See also ==
- List of Finnish Jews
- Finland–Israel relations
- Finnish culture
- Elias Katz
- Vyborg Synagogue
