= Cross of the Warsaw Uprising =

Polish resistance award

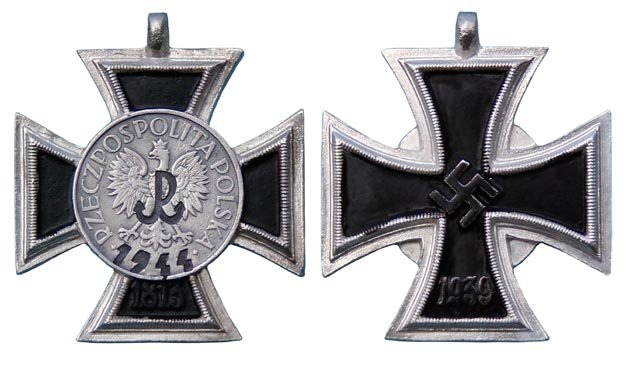
Replica (cast) of Cross of the Warsaw Uprising

The Cross of the Warsaw Uprising (Polish: Krzyż Powstania Warszawskiego) was an informal award used by soldiers of the Polish resistance during the Warsaw Uprising of 1944. It consisted of a captured German Iron Cross, with a pre-war 1 złoty coin pinned to it in the centre over the swastika; the reverse side of the coin, showing the Polish eagle, was displayed, to which was added a kotwica and the inscription "1944". It was awarded for killing an SS officer in combat and made during quieter periods in between the fighting.

== See also ==
- Warsaw Uprising
- Home Army
- Polish resistance movement in World War II
- Polish contribution to World War II
- Operation Tempest
- Wola massacre
- Ochota massacre
- Robinson Crusoes of Warsaw
- Warsaw Insurgents Cemetery
- Warsaw Uprising Museum
- Warsaw Uprising Monument
- Little Insurgent Monument
- Monument to Victims of the Wola Massacre
