= Leo Skurnik =

Finnish physician and medical officer (1907–1976)

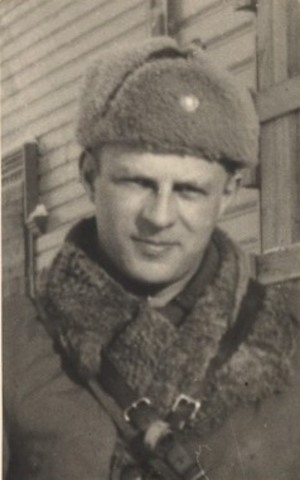
- Skurnik in 1940
- Born: 28 March 1907; Helsinki, Grand Duchy of Finland, Russian Empire
- Died: 4 December 1976 (aged 69); Oulu, Finland
- Military career
- Allegiance: Finnish Army
- Rank: Medical major
- Units: Pioneer Battalion 15 of the 53rd Infantry Regiment, Finnish III Corps
- Awards: Iron Cross, 2nd Class (refused)

Leo Skurnik (28 March 1907 – 4 December 1976) was a Finnish physician, a medical officer in the Finnish Army and one of the three Finnish Jews who were proposed to be awarded the Iron Cross by Nazi Germany during World War II but refused to accept it.

== Early life ==
Leo Skurnik was born in Helsinki, Grand Duchy of Finland, to parents, businessman Ben-Zian Skurnik and Sarah Skurnik. He was a descendant of one of the oldest cantonist Jewish families. Skurnik completed student matriculation in 1927 and became a Licentiate of Medicine in 1937. He married Lempi Irene Laukka in 1939 and started working as the municipal doctor of Ii. He had moved to Ii after he faced antisemitism while pursuing a scientific career at the University of Helsinki.

== Military service and the Iron Cross ==
When the Pioneer Battalion 5 (later Pioneer Battalion 15) was being formed during the Interim Peace in the Ii garrison, Skurnik, then with the rank of medical captain, was assigned as the battalion's doctor. Skurnik's unit was participating in the combined Finnish–German offensive from Kiestinki to Loukhi, which was one of the costliest actions in the early phase of the Continuation War. The strength of the Finnish Infantry Regiment 54 had been reduced from 2,800 to 800 during the heavy fighting in August 1941, and it has been estimated that the field hospital with seven doctors where Skurnik was stationed received a hundred wounded men each day.

In September 1941, Skurnik organized the evacuation of a field hospital amid heavy Soviet artillery shelling near Kiestinki, saving the lives of 600 wounded men, including Waffen-SS members. Skurnik split the evacuees into small formations and timed their departures between the artillery barrages. The German liaison headquarters, headed by General Waldemar Erfurth, proposed awarding the Iron Cross to Skurnik for the effort deemed heroic, a proposal which was accepted in Berlin. However, Skurnik refused to accept the award. Skurnik's rebuff caused the Germans to respond with open annoyance. The two other Finnish Jews awarded with the Iron Cross, Captain Salomon Klass and nurse Dina Poljakoff, also refused the award.

Discontent with having to work with the German troops later contributed to Skurnik requesting a transfer to the Uhtua front in the summer of 1942. Later in the war, he was promoted to major and fought in the Vyborg–Petrozavodsk Offensive and the Lapland War. Finnish military history author, Colonel Wolf H. Halsti, lauded Skurnik's loyalty as surpassing a military doctor's usual duties, as Skurnik went to rescue wounded soldiers from no man's land when nobody else had the courage to do so.

== Later life ==
After the war, Skurnik continued working as a doctor in Ii until 1947. He divorced and married another woman, Helmi Annikki Kaisto, in 1949. Afterwards, he worked as a factory doctor for Rauma-Raahe Oy, municipal doctor for Paavola and Revonlahti between 1953 and 1961 and as a doctor for the City of Oulu from 1961 until his retirement. He died in Oulu in 1976 and was buried near the waters he used to fish on Kirkkosaari island, Ii.
