= Dina Poljakoff =

Finnish nurse (1919–2005)

- Born: 1919; Finland
- Died: 2005 (aged 85–86); Israel
- Years active: c. Early 1940s
- Known for: Refusing Iron Cross
- Medical career
- Profession: Military hospital nursing assistant
- Institutions: Lotta Svärd
- Awards: Iron Cross, 2nd Class (refused)

Dina Poljakoff (Hebrew: דינה פוליאקוף; 1919–2005) was a Finnish nurse. Despite being Jewish, she was offered the Iron Cross by Nazi Germany during World War II.

A native of Finland, Poljakoff was studying dentistry before the outbreak of World War II. During the war, she worked as a nurse for Lotta Svärd, an auxiliary organization associated with the White Guard. She served in the front lines of combat during World War II alongside German military units. She was not the only Jewish nurse to perform such service; her cousin, Chaje Steinbock, also worked as a nurse and accumulated a scrapbook of heartfelt messages of thanks from German soldiers who had been under her care.

Poljakoff made quite an impression on her German patients, to the point that she was nominated for the Iron Cross. She was one of three Finnish Jews to be offered the award; like the other two (Leo Skurnik and Salomon Klass), she did not accept the award. Unlike the other two, she did not ask for her name to be withdrawn from the recipient list, and on the day of the awards ceremony she checked the display table to verify that her award was there, before leaving without it.

Poljakoff later immigrated to Israel, settling in Petah Tikva and working as a dentist. She died in 2005 and was survived by a daughter and three grandchildren.
