= Vyborg Synagogue =

Finnish place of worship

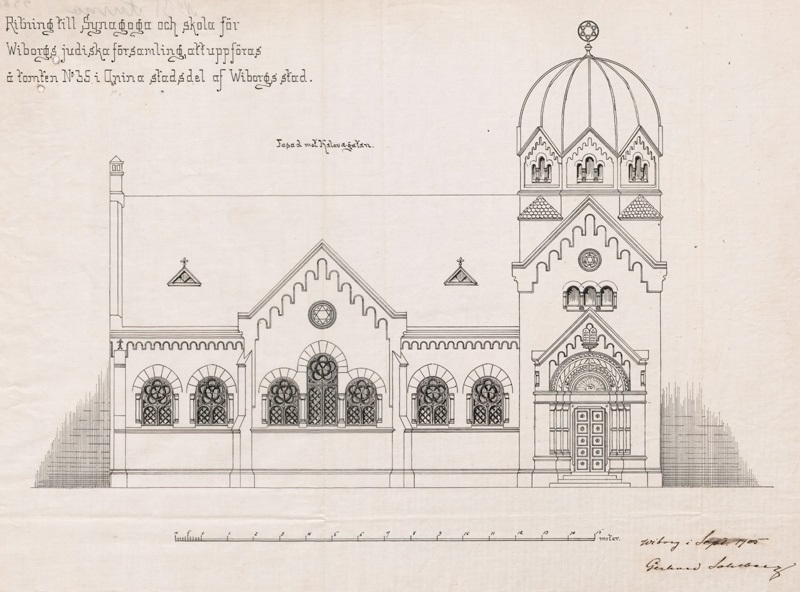
- Drawing by Gerhard Sohlberg, 1905

- Location of the destroyed synagogue in Finland

Religion
- Affiliation: Judaism (former)
- Rite: Nusach Ashkenaz
- Ecclesiastical or organizational status: Synagogue (1910–1939)
- Status: Closed; destroyed

Location
- Location: Vyborg
- Country: Finland
- Interactive map of Vyborg Synagogue
- Coordinates: 60°42′29″N 28°45′51″E

Architecture
- Architects: Gerhard Sohlberg; Viktor Riihelä
- Type: Synagogue architecture
- Style: Art Nouveau
- Completed: 1910
- Destroyed: 30 November 1939 (in the Winter War)

The Vyborg Synagogue was a Jewish synagogue, located in Vyborg. Completed in 1910, the synagogue was destroyed in 1939.

Designed in the Art Nouveau style by Finnish architect, Gerhard Sohlberg, in 1905, as part of the Grand Duchy of Finland, Vyborg Synagogue was one of the three synagogues ever built in Finland. The synagogue was built in 1909–1910 after some modifications by construction engineer Viktor Riihelä. The synagogue was completely destroyed by Soviet air bombings on the first day of Winter War, 30 November 1939.

== See also ==
- History of the Jews in Finland
