= Iron Cross =

German military decoration and symbol

Standard, most basic form of the Iron Cross

The Iron Cross (German: Eisernes Kreuz,, abbreviated EK) was a military decoration in the Kingdom of Prussia, the German Empire (1871–1918), and Nazi Germany (1933–1945). The design, a black cross pattée with a white or silver outline, was derived from the insignia of the medieval Teutonic Order and borne by its knights from the 13th century. As well as being a military medal, it has also been used as an emblem by the Prussian Army, the Imperial German Army, and the Reichswehr of the Weimar Republic, while the Balkenkreuz (bar cross) variant was used by the Wehrmacht. The Iron Cross is now the emblem of the Bundeswehr, the modern German armed forces.

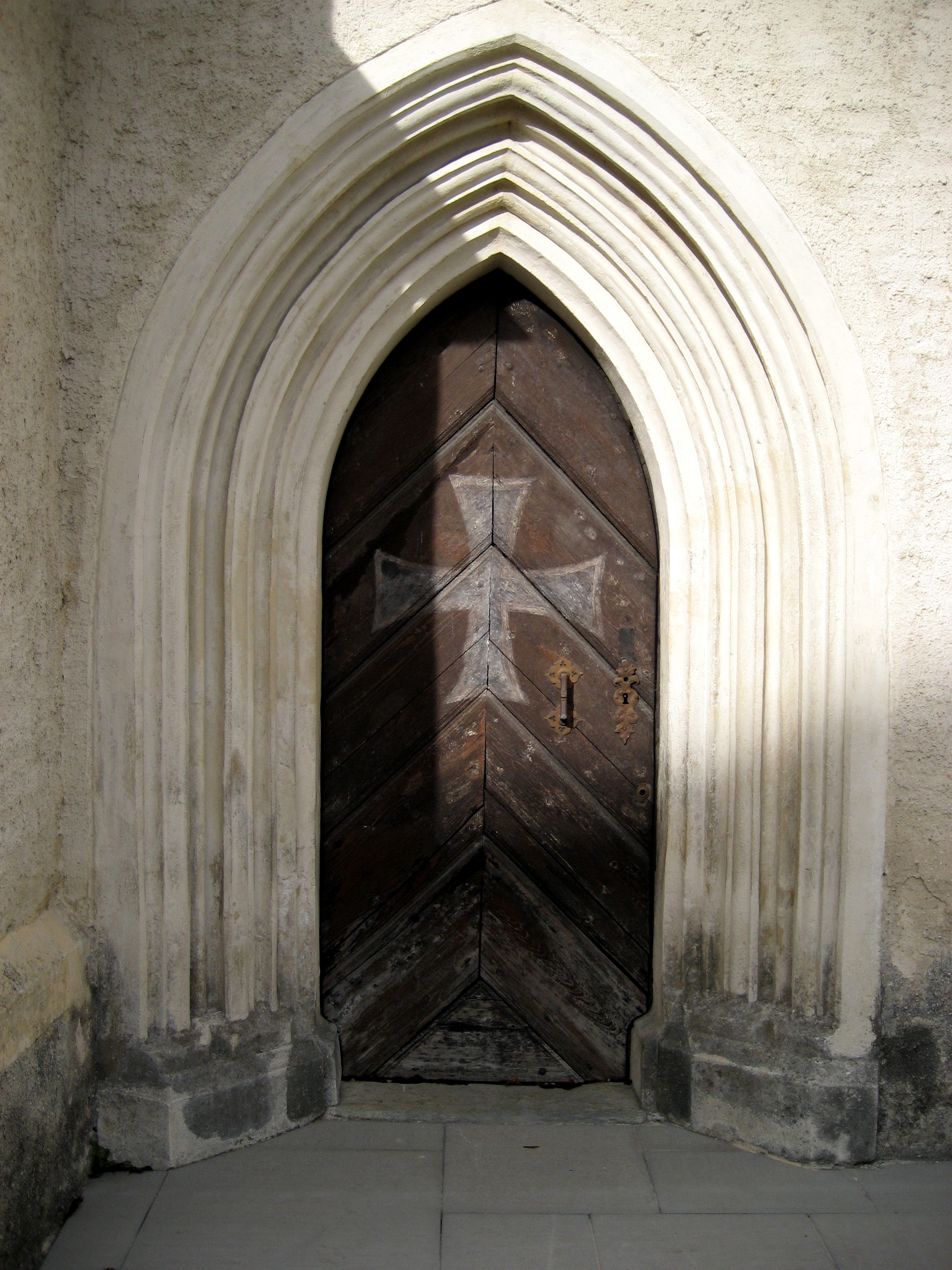
Black Cross of the Teutonic Order (Leechkirche, Graz)

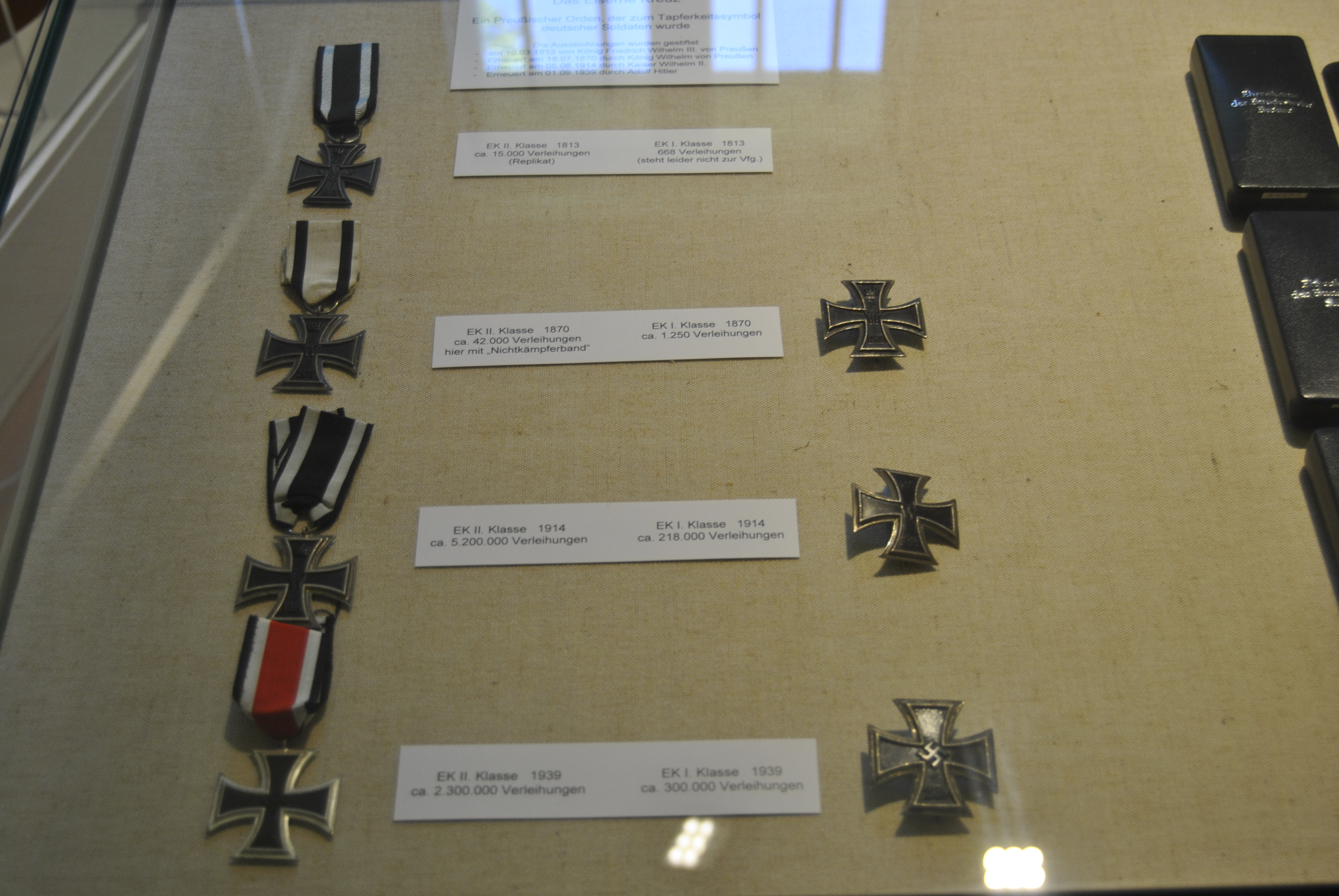
Collection of Iron Cross decorations throughout German military history

King Frederick William III of Prussia established the Iron Cross award on 17 March 1813 during the Napoleonic Wars (EK 1813). The award was backdated to the birthday (10 March) of his late wife, Queen Louise, who was the first person to receive it (posthumously). The Iron Cross was also awarded during the Franco-Prussian War (EK 1870), World War I (EK 1914), and World War II (EK 1939). During World War II, the Nazi regime made their own version by superimposing a swastika on the medal. The Iron Cross was usually a military decoration only, though some were awarded to civilians for performing military roles, including Hanna Reitsch and Melitta Schenk Gräfin von Stauffenberg for being civilian test pilots during World War II.

Since the late 20th century, the symbol has also been adopted into the outlaw motorcycle subculture and heavy metal fashion.

== Black Cross emblem ==
War flag of Prussia (1816)

The Black Cross (Schwarzes Kreuz) is the emblem used by the Prussian Army and Germany's army from 1871 to the present. It was designed on the occasion of the German Campaign of 1813, when Friedrich Wilhelm III of Prussia commissioned the Iron Cross as the first military decoration open to all ranks, including enlisted men. From this time, the Black Cross was featured on the Prussian war flag alongside the Black Eagle. It was designed by neoclassical architect Karl Friedrich Schinkel, based on Friedrich Wilhelm III. The design is ultimately derivative of the black cross used by the Teutonic Order. This heraldic cross took various forms throughout the order's history, including a Latin cross, a cross potent, cross fleury, and occasionally also a cross pattée.

When the Quadriga of the Goddess of Peace was retrieved from Paris at Napoleon's fall, it was re-established atop Berlin's Brandenburg Gate. An Iron Cross was inserted into Peace's laurel wreath, making her into a Goddess of Victory. In 1821 Schinkel crowned the top of his design of the National Monument for the Liberation Wars with an Iron Cross, becoming name-giving as Kreuzberg (cross mountain) for the hill it stands on and, 100 years later, for the homonymous quarter adjacent to it.

The Black Cross was used on the naval and combat flags of the German Empire. The Black Cross was used as the German Army symbol until 1915 when a simpler Balkenkreuz replaced it. The Reichswehr of the Weimar Republic (1921–35), the Wehrmacht of Nazi Germany (1935–45), and the Bundeswehr (1 October 1956 to present) also inherited the use of the emblem in various forms. The traditional design in black is used on armored vehicles and aircraft, while after German reunification, a new creation in blue and silver was introduced for use in other contexts.

== Medal and ribbon design ==
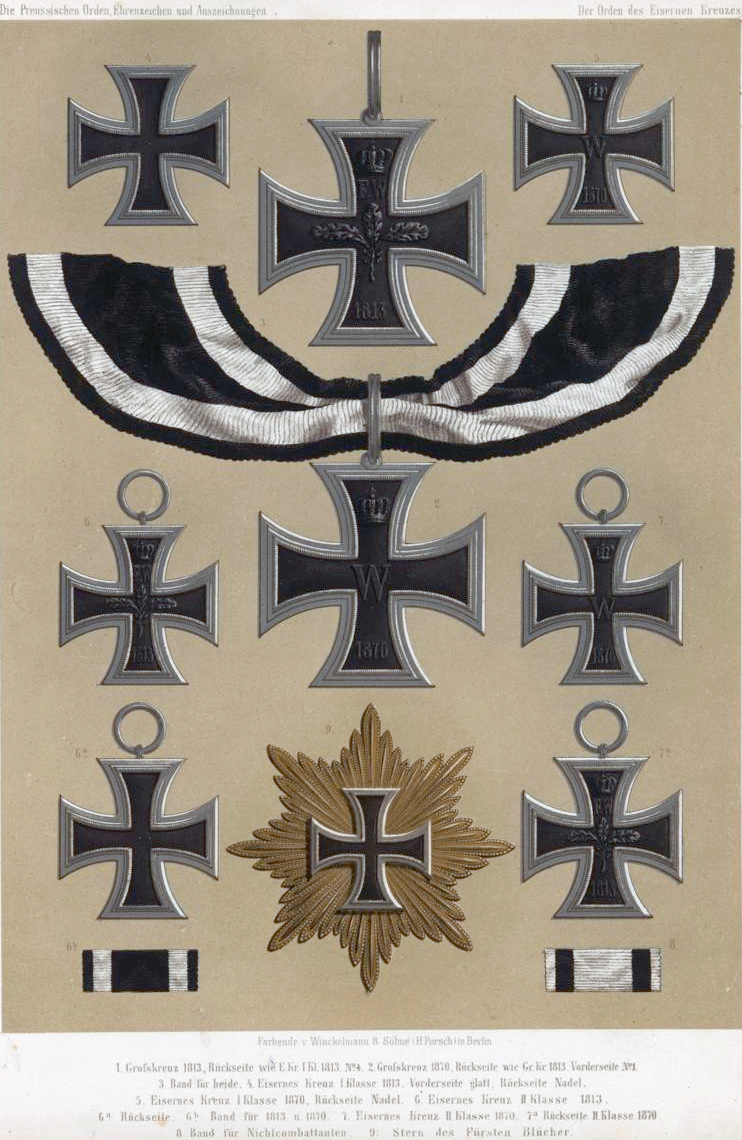
Various versions from 1813 to 1870

The ribbon for the 1813, 1870 and 1914 Iron Cross (2nd Class) was black with two thin white bands, the colors of Prussia. The non-combatant version of this award had the same medal, but the black and white colors on the ribbon were reversed. The ribbon color for the 1939 EKII was black/white/red/white/black.

Since the Iron Cross was issued over several different periods of German history, it was annotated with the year indicating the era in which it was issued. For example, an Iron Cross from World War I bears the year "1914", while the same decoration from World War II is annotated "1939". The reverse of the 1870, 1914 and 1939 series of Iron Crosses have the year "1813" appearing on the lower arm, symbolizing the year the award was created. The 1813 decoration also has the initials "FW" for King Friedrich Wilhelm III, while the next two have a "W" for the respective kaisers, Wilhelm I and Wilhelm II. The final version shows a swastika representing the Nazi Party instead of a letter for a German monarch. There was also the "1957" issue, a replacement medal for holders of the 1939 series which substituted an oak-leaf cluster for the banned swastika.

When the Iron Cross was reauthorized for World War I in 1914, it was possible for individuals who had previously been awarded one in 1870 to be subsequently granted another. These recipients were recognized with the award of a clasp featuring a miniaturized 1914 Iron Cross on a metal bar. The award was quite rare, since by this time there were few in service who held the 1870 Iron Cross. In World War II it was also possible for a holder of the 1914 Iron Cross to be awarded a second or higher grade of the 1939 Iron Cross. In such cases, a "1939 Clasp" (Spange) would be worn on the original 1914 Iron Cross. For the 1st Class award, the Spange appears as an eagle with the date "1939". This was pinned to the uniform above the original medal. Although they were two separate awards in some cases the holders soldered them together.

A cross has been the symbol of Germany's armed forces (now the Bundeswehr) since 1871.

== Wars of Liberation ==
On 17 March 1813 King Frederick William III of Prussia, who had fled to non-occupied Breslau (today Wrocław), established the military decoration of the Iron Cross, backdated to 10 March (the late Queen Louise's birthday). The Iron Cross was awarded to soldiers during the Wars of Liberation against Napoleon. Before a soldier could be awarded with the Iron Cross 1st Class, he needed to have been decorated with the Iron Cross 2nd Class. It was first awarded to Karl August Ferdinand von Borcke on 21 April 1813. The first form of the Iron Crosses 1st Class were stitched in ribbon to the left uniform breast. By order of 1 June 1813, the 2nd form was created in cast iron with silver borders, and 8 loops on the reverse, to be fixed to the left uniform breast. In 1817 a total of 670 chevaliers had received the Iron Cross 1st Class.

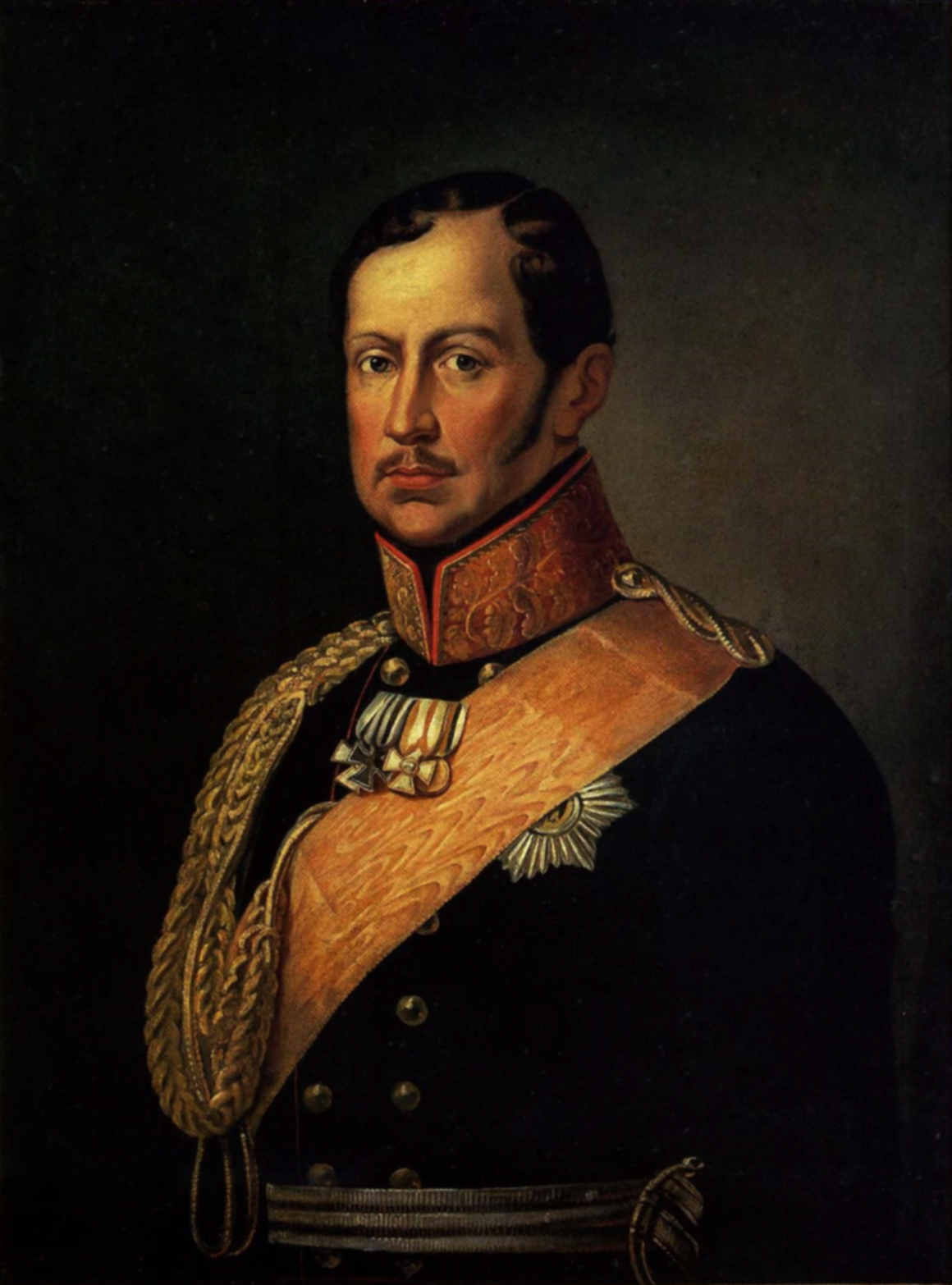
King Frederick William III of Prussia, creator of the award

1813 Iron Cross

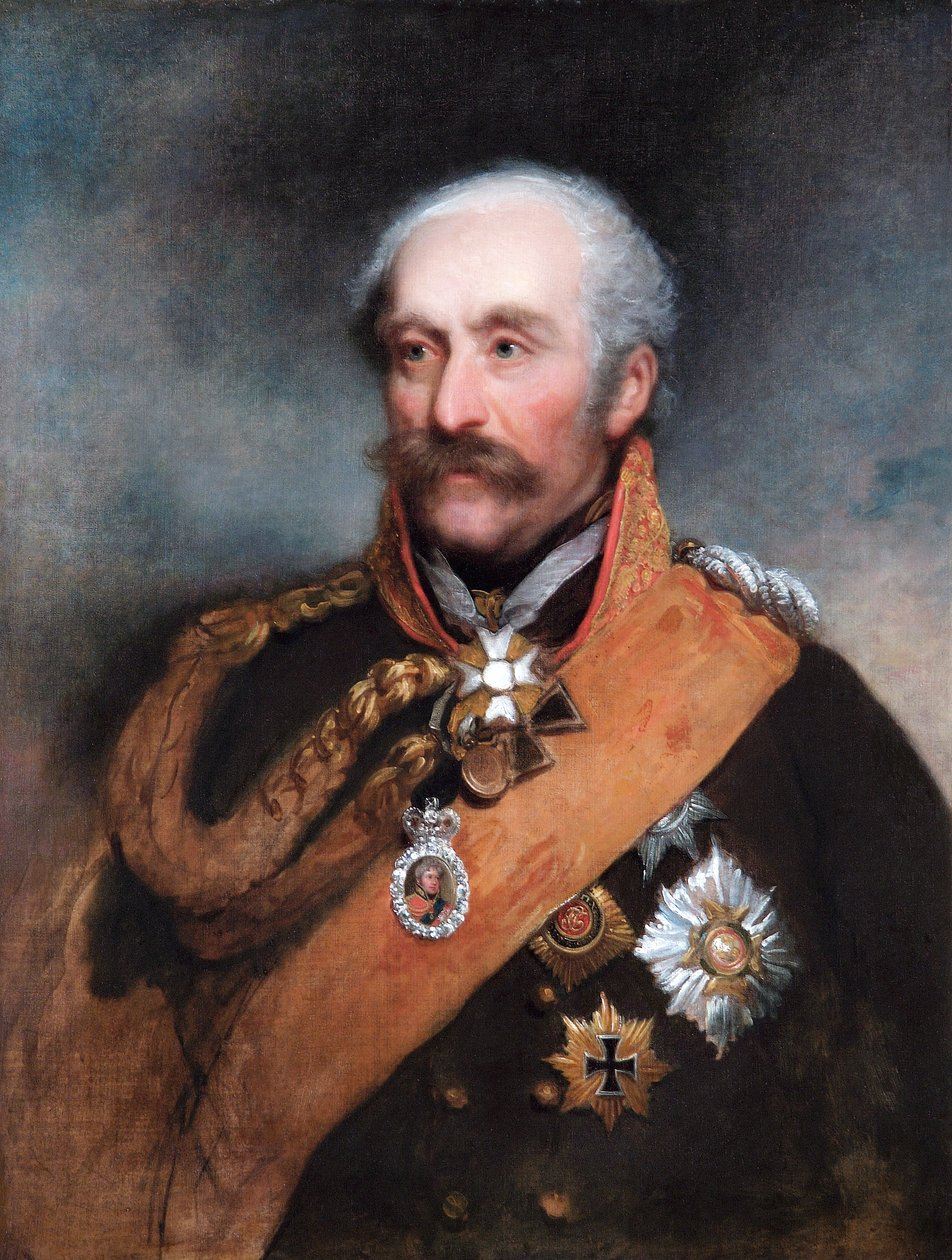
Field Marshal Blücher wearing the 1813 Grand Cross of the Iron Cross (around his neck), and the Star (on his chest)

== Franco-Prussian War ==
King Wilhelm I of Prussia authorized further awards on 19 July 1870, during the Franco-Prussian War. Recipients of the 1870 Iron Cross who were still in service in 1895 were authorized to purchase and wear above the cross a Jubiläumsspange ("Jubilee clip"), a 25-year clasp consisting of the numerals "25" on three oak leaves.

William Manley is possibly the only recipient of both the Iron Cross and the Victoria Cross. He was awarded the Iron Cross for service with an ambulance unit in the Franco-Prussian War of 1870–71.

== World War I ==
1914 Iron Cross

Emperor Wilhelm II reauthorized the Iron Cross on 5 August 1914, at the start of World War I. During these three periods, the Iron Cross was an award of the Kingdom of Prussia, although—given Prussia's pre-eminent place in the German Empire formed in 1871—it tended to be treated as a generic German decoration. The 1813, 1870, and 1914 Iron Crosses had three grades:

- Iron Cross, 2nd class, (Eisernes Kreuz 2. Klasse, or EKII)
- Iron Cross, 1st class, (Eisernes Kreuz 1. Klasse, or EKI)
- Grand Cross of the Iron Cross (Großkreuz des Eisernen Kreuzes, often simply Großkreuz)

Although the obverse of the medals of each class was identical, the manner in which each was worn differed. The Iron Cross, 1st class, employed a pin or screw posts on the back of the medal, and was worn on the left side of the recipient's uniform, like the original 1813 version. The Iron Cross 2nd Class, and the larger Grand Cross, were suspended from different ribbons: the Grand Cross from a neck ribbon, the 2nd Class from a ribbon on the chest. The usual display of the 2nd Class version was as a ribbon through one of the button holes in the recipient's tunic.

The Grand Cross was intended for senior generals of the Prussian or (later) the German Army. An even higher decoration, the Star of the Grand Cross of the Iron Cross (also called the Blücher Star), was awarded only twice, to Generalfeldmarschall Gebhard Leberecht von Blücher in 1813 and to Generalfeldmarschall Paul von Hindenburg in 1918. A third award was planned for the most successful German general during World War II, but was not made after the defeat of Germany in 1945.

The Iron Cross, 1st class, and the Iron Cross, 2nd class, were awarded without regard to rank. One had to possess the 2nd Class already in order to receive the 1st Class (though in some cases both could be awarded simultaneously). The egalitarian nature of this award contrasted with those of most other German states (and indeed of many other European monarchies), where military decorations were awarded based on the rank of the recipient. For example, Bavarian officers received various grades of that Kingdom's Military Merit Order (Militär-Verdienstorden), while enlisted men received various grades of the Military Merit Cross (Militär-Verdienstkreuz). Prussia did have other orders and medals which it awarded on the basis of rank, and even though the Iron Cross was intended to be awarded without regard to rank, officers and NCOs were more likely to receive it than junior enlisted soldiers.

During World War I, approximately 218,000 EKIs, 5,196,000 EKIIs and 13,000 non-combatant EKIIs were awarded. Exact numbers of awards are not known, since the Prussian military archives were destroyed during World War II. The multitude of awards reduced the status and reputation of the decoration. Among the holders of the 1914 Iron Cross, 2nd class, and 1st Class was Adolf Hitler, who served as an Austrian citizen in the Bavarian Army with the rank of Gefreiter (lance-corporal), he received these medals for showing bravery on the field of battle. Most photographs of Hitler show him wearing his EKI in standard fashion on his left breast.

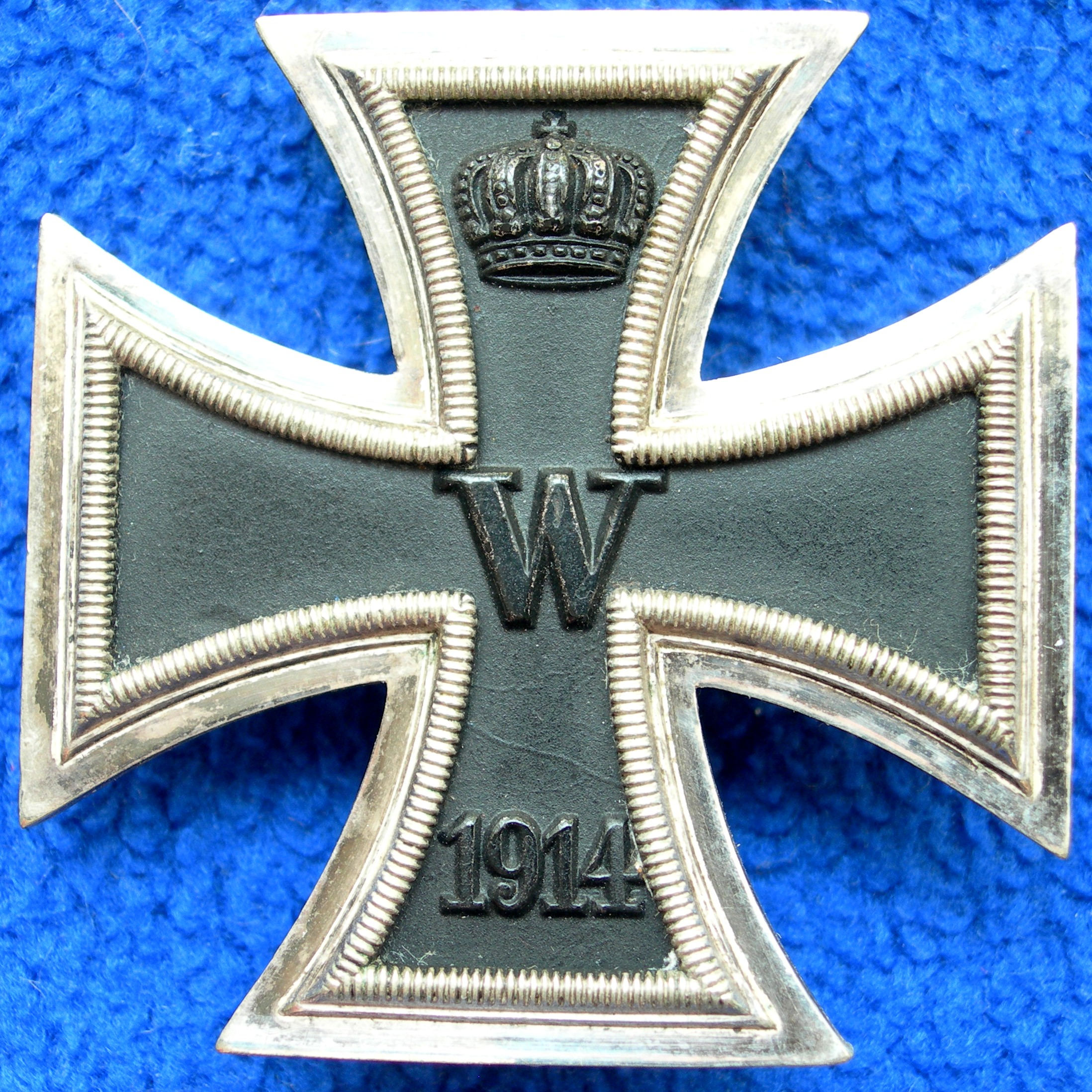
World War I Iron Cross, 1st Class

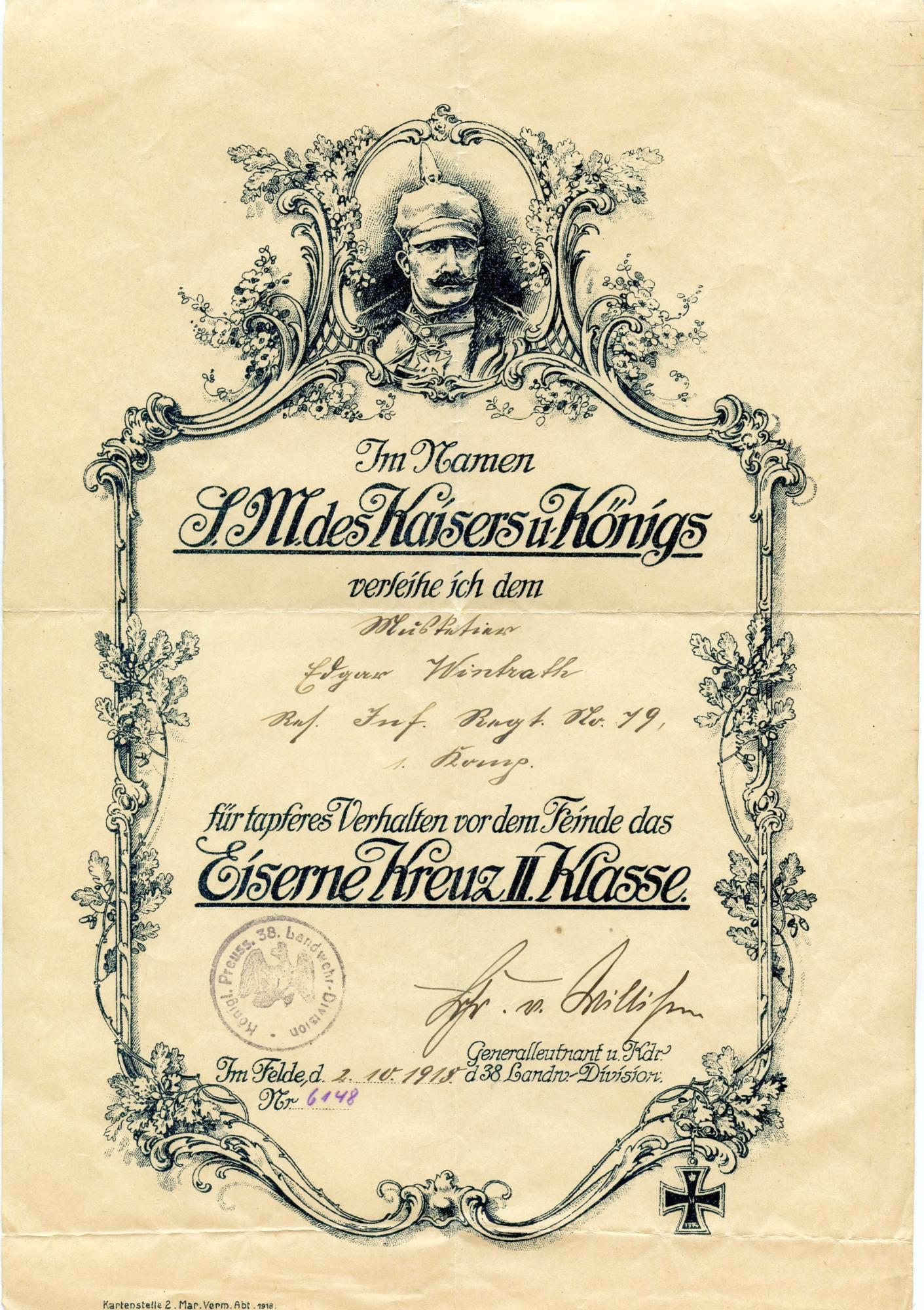
Certificate of award to a musketeer in the Royal Prussian Landwehr, October 1918

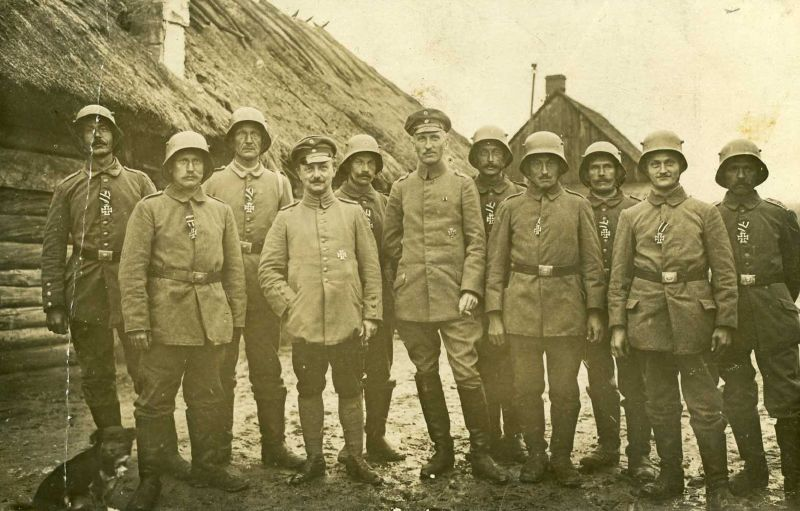
German soldiers who had been awarded the Iron Cross

=== Allied propaganda versions ===
In 1914, a variety of very crude anti-German propaganda versions of the Iron Cross were created by the Allies, and sold to raise money for the war effort and the relief of Belgian refugees. One was inscribed "FOR KULTUR" (Culture) in raised letters, another "FOR BRUTALITY." Other varieties showed the names of French and Belgian towns attacked or destroyed during the retreat from Mons on the ends of the upper arms of the cross; these included Rheims, Louvain and Amiens on one side, and Antwerp, Dinant and Ghent on the other, with the date 1914 on the lower arm. Some had "FOR BRUTAL CONDUCT" inscribed in the middle with a central W for Kaiser Wilhelm as on the original. Another commemorated the raid on Scarborough, Hartlepool and Whitby, showing the names of these "war atrocities" on the arms of the cross.

== World War II ==
1939 Iron Cross

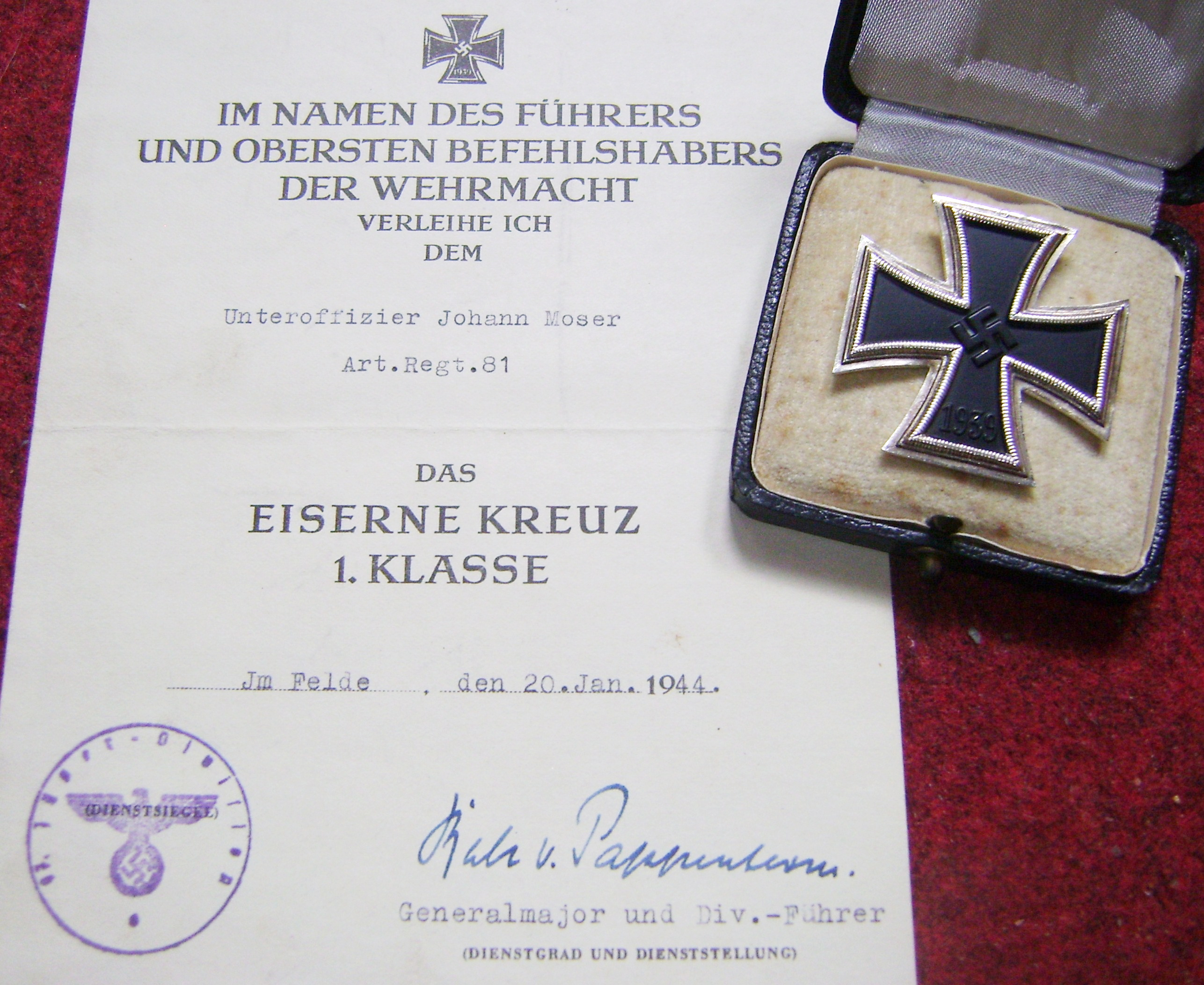
World War II Iron Cross, 1st class, with certificate

Adolf Hitler restored the Iron Cross in 1939 as a German decoration (rather than Prussian), and continued the tradition of issuing it in various classes. Legally, it is based on the "Enactment for the re-introduction of the Iron Cross" (Verordnung über die Erneuerung des Eisernen Kreuzes) of 1 September 1939. The Iron Cross of World War II was divided into three main series of decorations: the Iron Cross (the lowest), the Knight's Cross (intermediate), and the Grand Cross (the highest). The Knight's Cross replaced the Prussian Pour le Mérite or "Blue Max". Hitler did not care for the Pour le Mérite, as it was a Prussian order that could be awarded only to officers. The ribbon of the medal (2nd class and Knight's Cross) was different from the earlier Iron Crosses as the color red was used in addition to the traditional black and white (black and white were the colors of Prussia, while black, white, and red were the colors of Nazi Germany). Hitler also created the War Merit Cross as a replacement for the non-combatant version of the Iron Cross. It also appeared on certain Nazi flags in the upper left corner. The sides of the cross were curved, like most original iron crosses.

=== Iron Cross (1939) ===
The standard 1939 Iron Cross was issued in the following two grades:

- Iron Cross, 2nd class, (Eisernes Kreuz 2. Klasse – abbreviated as EK II or E.K.II.)
- Iron Cross, 1st class, (Eisernes Kreuz 1. Klasse – abbreviated as EK I or E.K.I.)

The Iron Cross was awarded for bravery in battle as well as other military contributions in a battlefield environment.

The Iron Cross, 2nd class, came with a ribbon and the cross itself was worn in one of two different ways:

- From the second button in the tunic from the first day after award.
- When in formal dress, the entire cross was worn mounted alone or as part of a medal bar.

Note that for everyday wear, only the ribbon was worn from the second buttonhole in the tunic.

The Iron Cross, 1st class, was a pin-on medal with no ribbon and was worn centered on a uniform breast pocket, either on dress uniforms or everyday outfit. It was a progressive award, with the second class having to be earned before the first class and so on for the higher degrees.

It is estimated that some four and a half million 2nd Class Iron Crosses were awarded during World War II, and 300,000 of the 1st Class.

Female recipients

Thirty-nine women, chiefly nurses from the German Red Cross, were awarded the Iron Cross 2nd Class. Notable examples include:

- Elfriede Wnuk, wounded in 1942 on the Eastern Front
- Magda Darchniger, decorated in 1942
- Marga Droste, who remained at her post in the Wilhelmshaven hospital despite her own wounds during a bombing in 1942
- Ilse Schulz and Grete Fock, who served in the African campaign
- Liselotte Hensel and Miss Holzmann, who were both decorated in 1943 for bravery during a bombing of Hamburg
- Countess Melitta Schenk Gräfin von Stauffenberg, acting as a qualified test pilot and development engineer and decorated in August 1943.

Other DRK female auxiliaries who received the Iron Cross for acts of bravery are Hanny Weber, Geolinde Münchge, Elfriede Gunia, Ruth Raabe, Ilse Daub, Greta Graffenkamp, Elfriede Muth, Ursula Kogel, Liselotte Schlotterbeck, Rohna von Ceuern, Anna Wohlschütz, and Elizabeth Potuz. Two non-German female auxiliaries of the German Red Cross were awarded the Iron Cross: Norwegian nurse Anne Gunhild Moxnes in April 1944, and an unknown Belgian nurse in 1942. A young member of the female youth organisation of the Third Reich, Ottilie Stephan, was also awarded the Iron Cross in February 1945 under unknown circumstances. At least two Iron Cross, 1st class, recipients were women, test pilot (Flugkapitän) Hanna Reitsch and in January 1945 German Red Cross sister Else Grossmann.

Other notable recipients

One of the Muslim SS members to receive the award, SS Obersturmführer Imam Halim Malkoč was granted the Iron Cross (2nd Class) in October 1943 for his role in suppressing the Villefranche-de-Rouergue mutiny. He, together with several other Bosnian Muslims, was decorated with the EK II personally by Himmler in the days after the mutiny. Because of his Muslim faith, he wore only the ribbon, and not the cross.

Three Finnish Jews were awarded the Iron Cross: Major Leo Skurnik and Captain Salomon Klass of the Finnish Army and nurse Dina Poljakoff from the Lotta Svärd organization. All three refused the award. The Spanish double-agent Juan Pujol García, known to the Germans as Arabel and the British as Garbo received the 2nd Class Iron Cross, and an MBE from King George VI four months later.

=== Knight's Cross of the Iron Cross ===
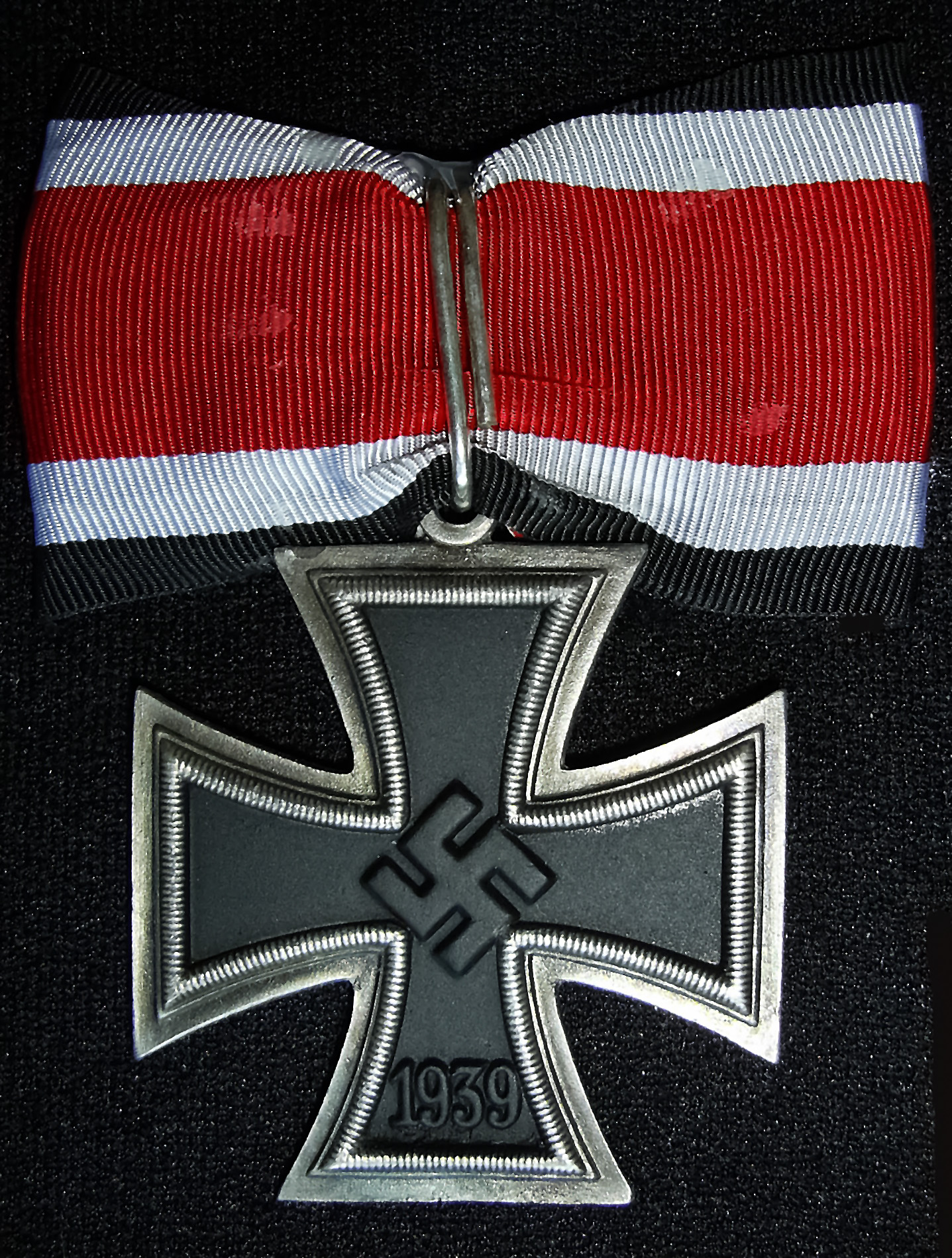
Knight's Cross of the Iron Cross

The Knight's Cross of the Iron Cross (Ritterkreuz des Eisernen Kreuzes, often simply Ritterkreuz) recognized military valour or successful leadership. The Knight's Cross was divided into five degrees:

- Knight's Cross (Ritterkreuz des Eisernen Kreuzes)
- Knight's Cross with Oak Leaves (mit Eichenlaub)
- Knight's Cross with Oak Leaves and Swords (mit Eichenlaub und Schwertern)
- Knight's Cross with Oak Leaves, Swords, and Diamonds (mit Eichenlaub, Schwertern und Brillanten)
- Knight's Cross with Golden Oak Leaves, Swords, and Diamonds (mit Goldenem Eichenlaub, Schwertern und Brillanten)

In total, 7,313 awards of the Knight's Cross were made. Only 883 received the Oak Leaves; 160 with Oak Leaves and Swords (including Japanese Admiral Isoroku Yamamoto (posthumously)); 27 with Oak Leaves, Swords and Diamonds; and one with the Golden Oak Leaves, Swords, and Diamonds (Oberst Hans-Ulrich Rudel).

=== Grand Cross of the Iron Cross (1939) ===
Like the Knight's Cross, the Grand Cross (Großkreuz) was worn suspended from the collar. It was reserved for general officers for "the most outstanding strategic decisions affecting the course of the war". The only recipient during the Second World War was Reichsmarschall Hermann Göring, who was awarded the decoration on 19 July 1940 for his command of the Luftwaffe, after the Battle of France in 1940.

The medal is a larger version of the Knight's Cross, measuring 63 mm (2.5 in) wide as opposed to about 44 mm (1.7 in) for the Iron Cross and 48.5 mm (1.9 in) for the Knight's Cross. It was originally intended to have outer edges lined in gold, but this was changed to silver before the award was presented. It was worn with a 57 mm (2.2 in) wide ribbon bearing the same colors as the Knight's Cross and 2nd Class ribbons. The award case was in red leather with the eagle and the swastika outlined in gold.

The original Grand Cross presented to Göring (personally by Hitler) was destroyed during an air raid on his Berlin home. Göring had extra copies made, one of them with a platinum frame that he was wearing at the time of his surrender to the allies in 1945.

== Star of the Grand Cross of the Iron Cross ==
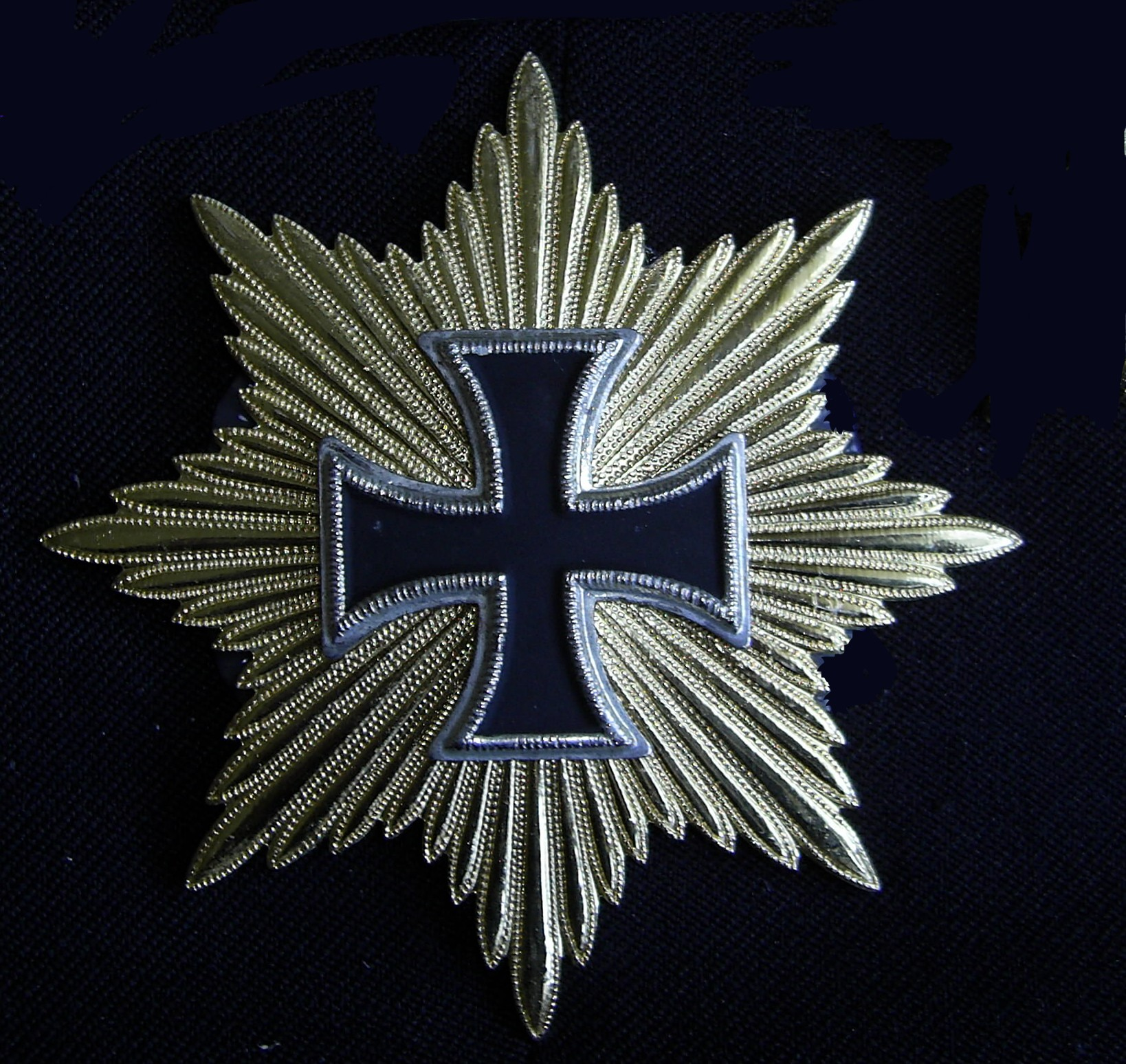
Star of the Grand Cross (1813)

The Star of the Grand Cross of the Iron Cross (also called Iron Cross with Golden Rays) was pinned to the left breast, above the Iron Cross 1st Class. Like the Grand Cross of the Iron Cross, it was for bestowal upon successful general officers.

The Star of the Grand Cross was awarded only twice, both to Field Marshals who already held the Grand Cross: in 1815 to Gebhard von Blücher for his part in the Battle of Waterloo, and in March 1918 to Paul von Hindenburg for his conduct of the 1918 Spring Offensive on the Western Front. It is often called the Blücher Star (Blücherstern), after its first recipient.

A Star of the Grand Cross of the Iron Cross was manufactured in World War II, but never formally instituted or awarded. The only known example, based on the World War I version but with the 1939 Iron Cross centerpiece, was found by Allied forces at the end of the war, and it is now in the museum at West Point. It is likely that Reichsmarschall Göring was the intended eventual recipient. He was the only holder of the World War II Iron Cross Grand Cross, and both the previous recipients of the Star had already received the Grand Cross.

== Side features of the Iron Cross and entitlements ==
Officers awarded the Iron Cross were given entitlements and often wore signifying articles, such as an Iron Cross signet ring or cloth Iron Cross which could be affixed to clothing. Also, during the Nazi period, those attaining more than one award, for example, an officer who had attained an Iron Cross 2nd Class, an Iron Cross 1st Class, and the Knight's Cross of the Iron Cross with the Oak Leaves, were entitled to wear a pin which exhibited three Iron Crosses with an exaggerated swastika, thereby consolidating the awards.

In some cases, Minox miniature cameras were given to people together with an Iron Cross.

== Post-World War II ==
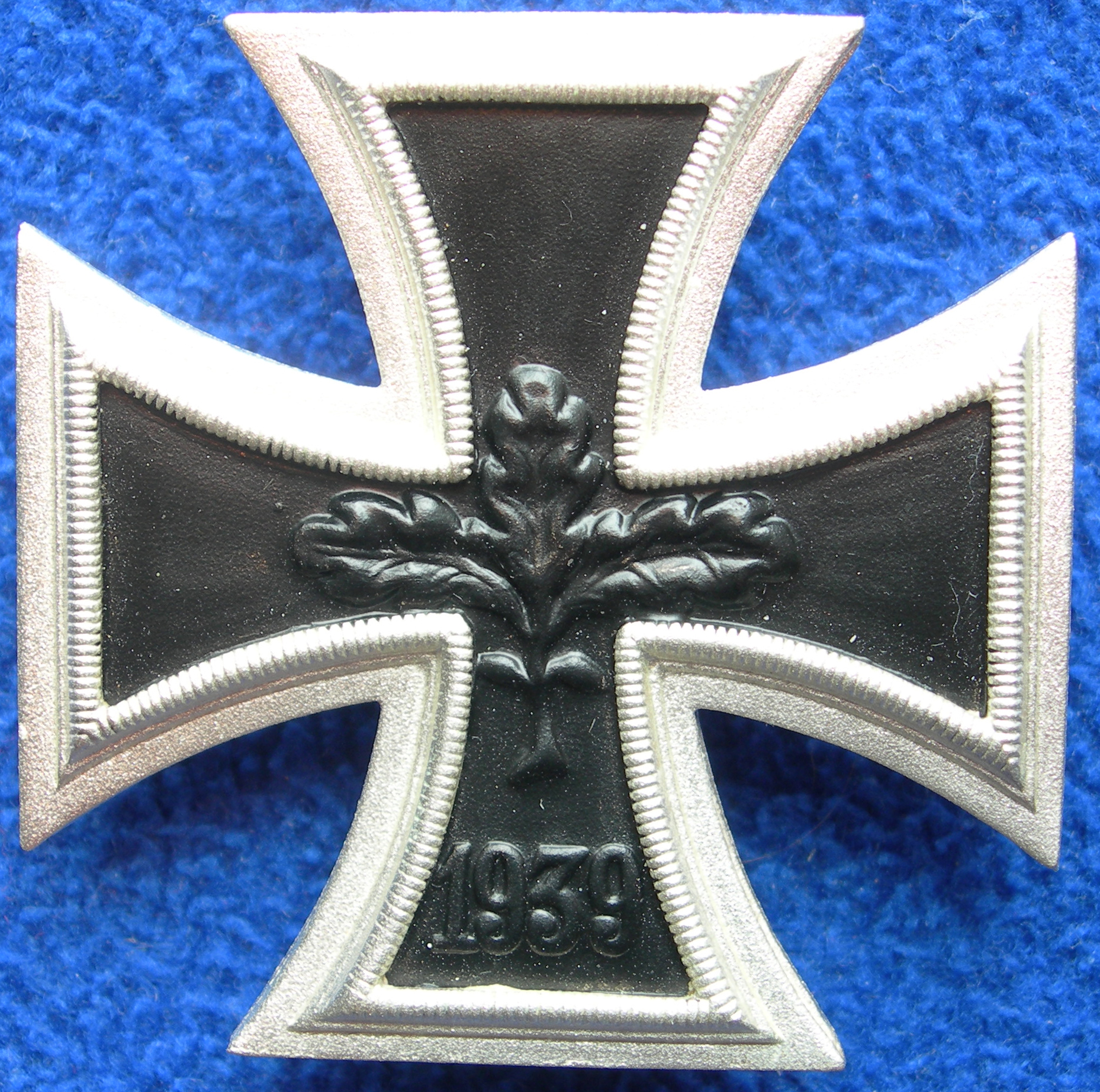
The 1957 version of the 1939 Iron Cross with trifoliate oak leaves replacing the swastika

As modern German law prohibits the production and display of items containing Nazi insignia, the West German government authorized replacement Iron Crosses in 1957 with a trifoliate Oak Leaf Cluster in place of the swastika, similar to the Iron Crosses of 1813, 1870, and 1914, which could be worn by World War II Iron Cross recipients. The 1957 law also authorized de-Nazified versions of most other World War II-era decorations (except those specifically associated with Nazi Party organizations, such as SS Long Service medals, or with the expansion of the German Reich, such as the medals for the annexation of Austria, the Sudetenland and the Memel region).

After post-war German armed forces began seeing active service, first in Kosovo and then in Afghanistan, a campaign began to revive the Iron Cross and other military medals, since Germany had no awards specifically for active military service. In 2007, a petition to the German parliament to revive the Iron Cross decoration was initiated, quickly receiving over 5,000 signatures. On 13 December 2007 parliament decided to let the Ministry of Defence decide the matter. On 6 March 2008, President Horst Köhler approved a proposal by Minister of Defense Franz Josef Jung to institute a new award for bravery. The Ehrenzeichen der Bundeswehr (Badge of Honor of the German Armed Forces) series was instituted on 10 October 2008. However, it does not have the traditional form of the Iron Cross (instead more closely resembling the Prussian Military Merit Cross), but is seen as a supplement of existing awards of the Bundeswehr.

Emblem of the Bundeswehr, the modern German armed forces (since 1956)

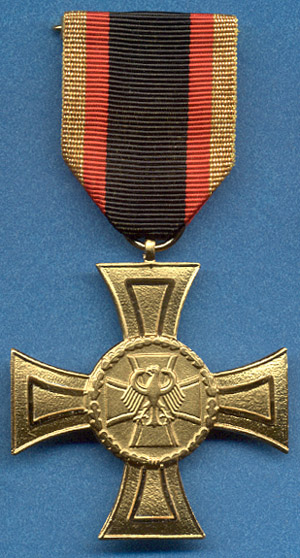
Badge of Honor of the German Armed Forces

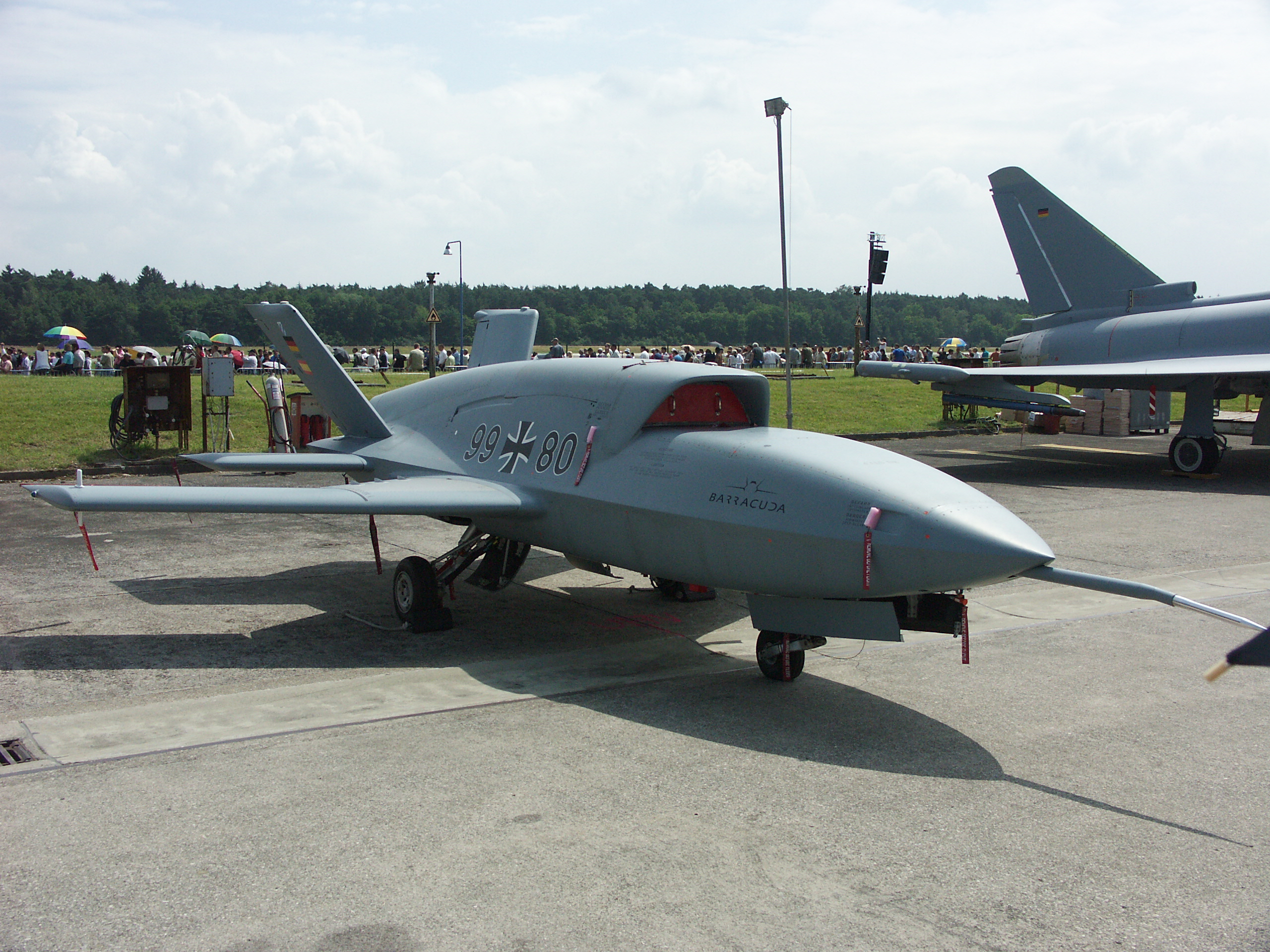
Iron Cross insignia on a UAV Barracuda

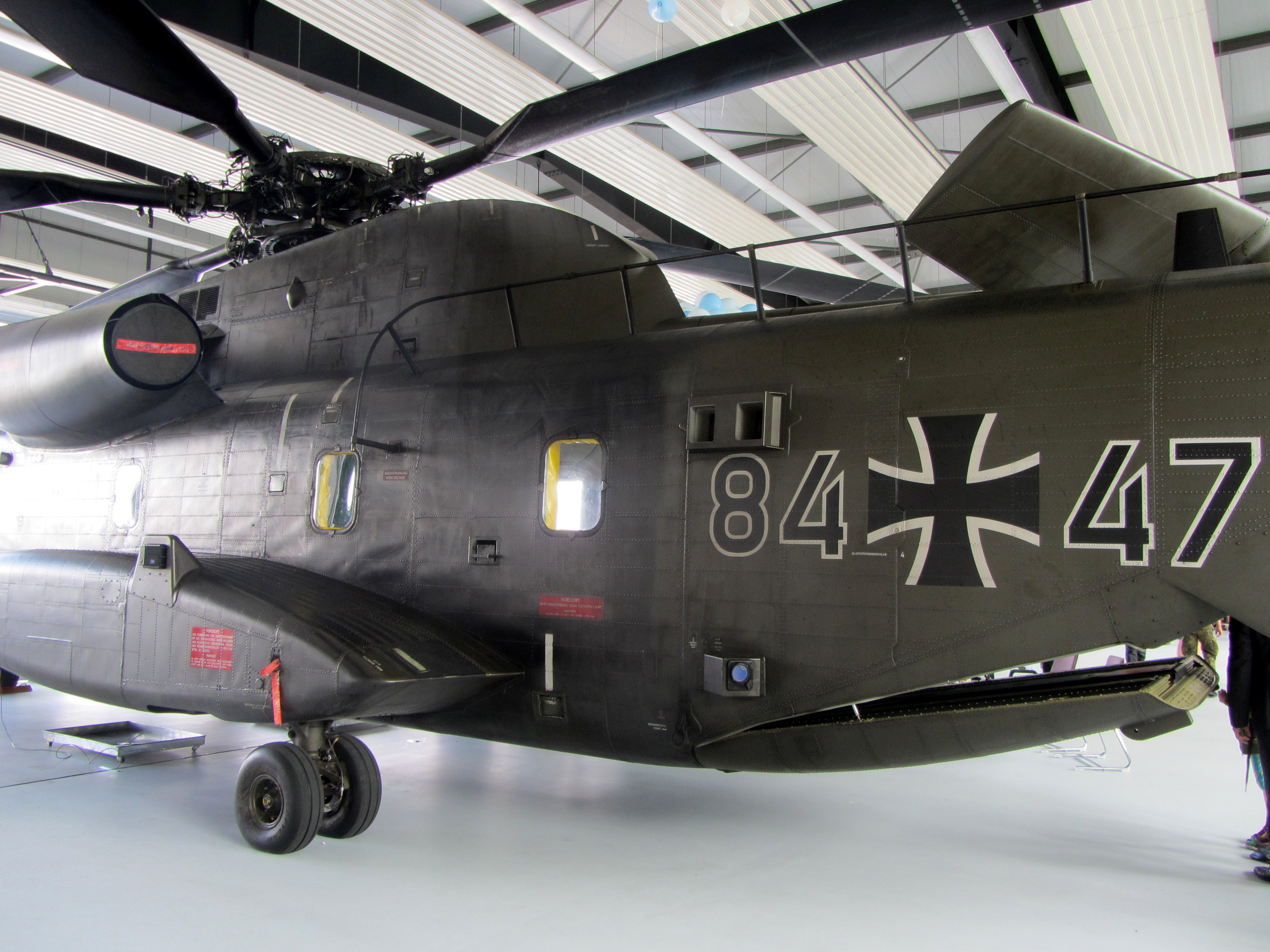
Iron Cross insignia on a German Air Force CH-53G in 2015

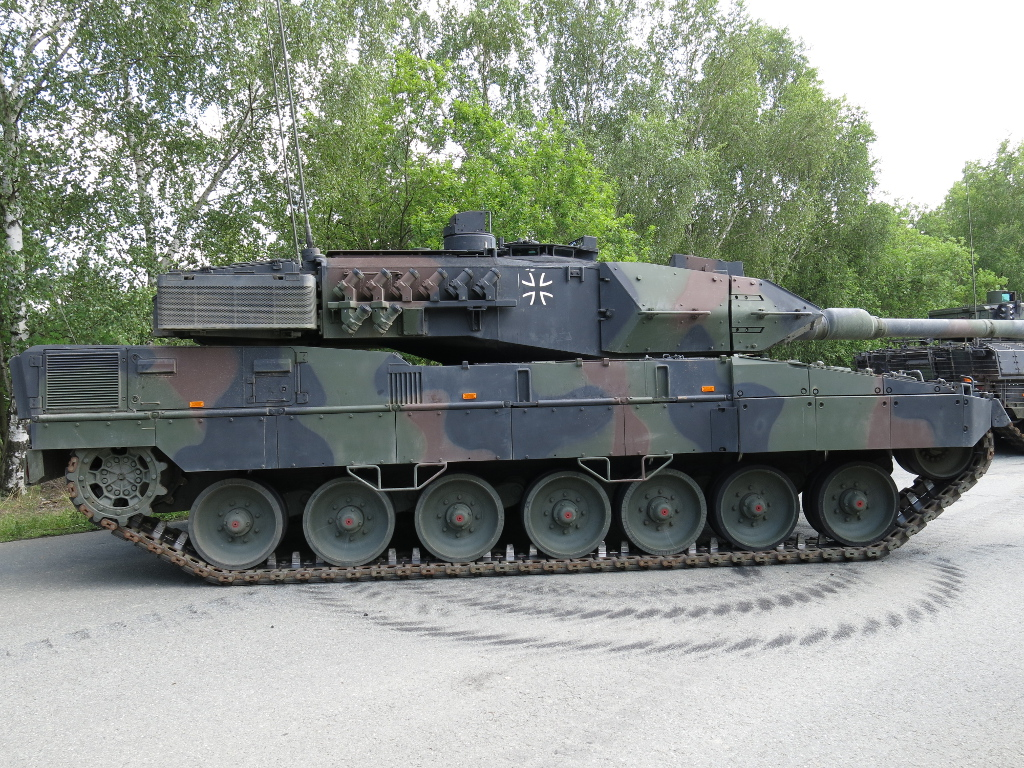
The Iron Cross insignia on a Leopard 2 main battle tank turret

Reservist Association of Deutsche Bundeswehr

Bundeswehr Soldiers' Relief Fund

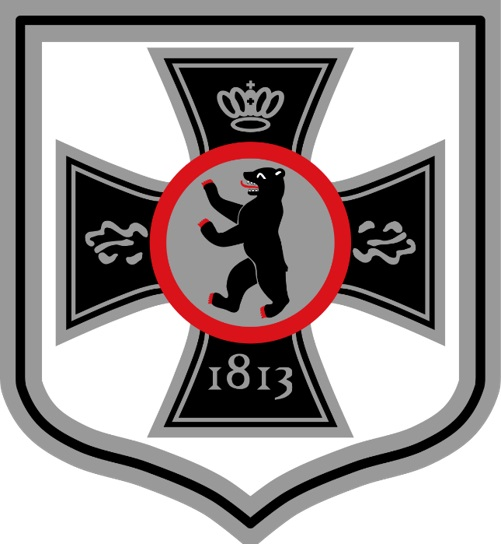
Standortkommando Berlin

Association badge of the tank battalion 524

Association badge of the tank battalion 403 (außer Dienst gestellt)

Association badge of the tank battalion 413

Emblem of the Polish Volunteer Corps

=== Biker and heavy metal subcultures ===
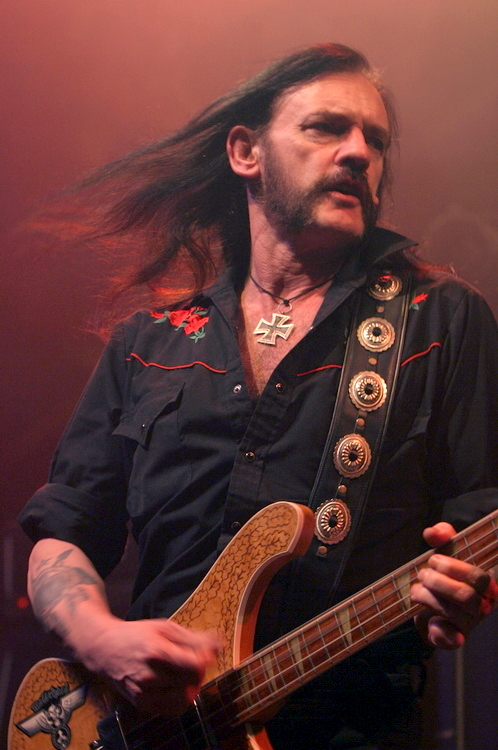
Lemmy Kilmister of Motörhead wearing his trademark Iron Cross necklace (Knight's Cross of the Iron Cross)

In the United States and elsewhere, the Iron Cross was adopted by outlaw motorcycle clubs in the 1960s, as a symbol of rebellion and probably for shock value. From biker subculture it spread to rock and heavy metal subcultures, becoming part of heavy metal fashion. Lemmy of the influential band Motörhead often wore one. In the 1990s, this other use of the Iron Cross had spread from bikers to skateboarders and many extreme sports enthusiasts and became part of the logo of several related clothing companies. The Anti-Defamation League states that the version of the symbol with a swastika has been commonly used by neo-Nazis and other white supremacists as a hate symbol since it was discontinued following World War II, but the wider use of the Iron Cross in various subcultures means determining its use as a hate symbol relies on context: "an Iron Cross in isolation (i.e., without a superimposed swastika or without other accompanying hate symbols) cannot be determined to be a hate symbol".

== Gallery of medal ribbons ==
Iron Cross 2nd Class
Iron Cross, 2nd class, 1813–1913	Iron Cross, 2nd class, for Non-combatants 1813–1918	EK II 1914, with 1939 clasp	EK II 1914–1939	EK II 1939–1945

Iron Cross 1st Class
Iron Cross, 1st class, 1813–1913	EK I 1914, with repetition 1939	EK I 1914–39	EK I 1939–45

Knight's Cross of the Iron Cross
Knight's Cross Alternative version	... with Oak Leaves Alternative version	... and Swords Alternative version	... and Diamonds Alternative version	...in Gold ... Alternative version

Grand Cross of the Iron Cross
Grand Cross to the Iron Cross	Star of the Grand Cross (Iron Cross)

== See also ==
- Grand Cross of the Iron Cross
- Star of the Grand Cross of the Iron Cross
- Knight's Cross of the Iron Cross
- 1939 Clasp to the 1914 Iron Cross
- Orders, decorations, and medals of Imperial Germany
- Orders, decorations, and medals of Nazi Germany
- Black Cross (Teutonic Order)
- Cross pattée
- Cross of the Warsaw Uprising (Krzyż Powstania Warszawskiego)
- Oxalis tetraphylla (a common name is Iron Cross)
- Medal for Service in War Overseas
