= Linz am Rhein =

- Town
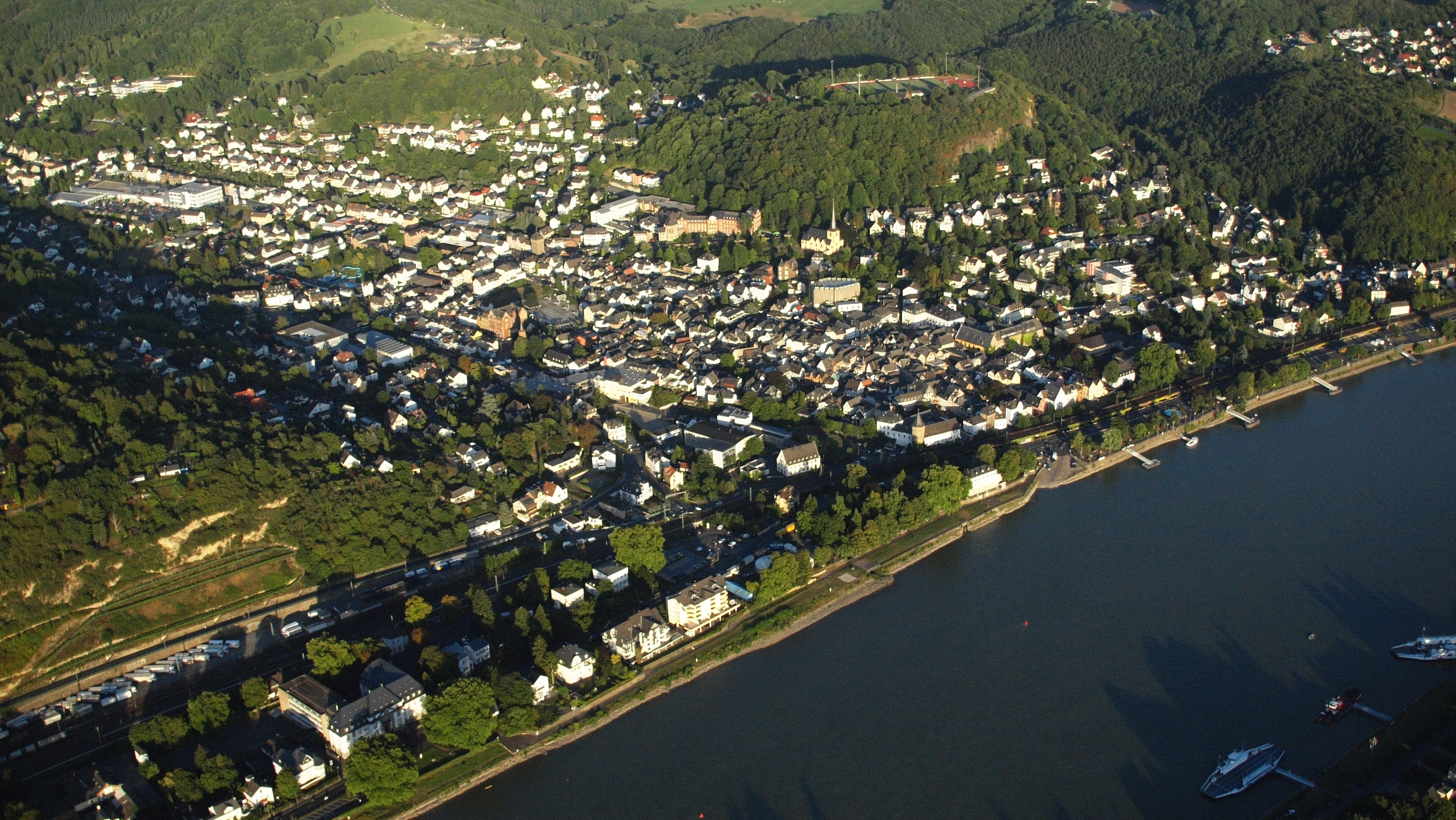
- Linz seen from the northwest

- Coat of arms

- Location of Linz am Rhein within Neuwied district
- Interactive map of Linz am Rhein
- Location within Germany Location within Rhineland-Palatinate
- Coordinates: 50°34′13″N 07°17′05″E
- Country: Germany
- State: Rhineland-Palatinate
- District: Neuwied
- Municipal assoc.: Linz am Rhein
- Subdivisions: 3 Stadtteile

Government
  - Mayor (2019–24): Hans-Georg Faust (CDU)

Area
  - Total: 17.98 km^{2} (6.94 sq mi)
- Elevation: 57–386 m (187–1,266 ft)

Population (2025-12-31)
  - Total: 6,276
  - Density: 349.1/km^{2} (904.0/sq mi)
- Time zone: UTC+01:00 (CET)
  - Summer (DST): UTC+02:00 (CEST)
- Postal codes: 53545
- Dialling codes: 02644
- Vehicle registration: NR
- Website: www.linz.de

Linz am Rhein (German pronunciation: [ˈlɪnts ʔam ˈʁaɪn], lit. 'Linz on the Rhine') is a municipality in the district of Neuwied, in Rhineland-Palatinate, Germany. It is situated on the right bank of the river Rhine near Remagen, approx. 25 km southeast of Bonn and has about 6,000 inhabitants. It is the sister city of Marietta, Georgia in the United States, Linz in Austria and Pornic in France.

Linz is the seat of the Verbandsgemeinde ("collective municipality") Linz am Rhein.

The town is also a destination for tourists thanks to its location next to the Rhine river and its colorful half-timbered houses.

== History ==
The town of Linz was first mentioned in an official document in 874 and called "Lincesce".

Between 1206 and 1214 the parish church of St. Martin was built at the most elevated spot of the town. A former church, which was located at the same place, had been destroyed during the fights of Otto IV and Philip of Swabia in 1198. During reconstruction work in 1981 the remains of graves and foundations belonging to the former church were found.

The most important political decision for Linz was taken in the late Middle Ages. Between 1304 and 1332 Linz was officially awarded city status by the Archbishop of Cologne, Heinrich II of Virneburg. Shortly after having been declared a "city", the castle Burg Linz was built.

In 1391 a fire destroyed two thirds of the city. In 1475 the Emperor's troops occupied Linz during the Neuss War. The town hall, which is one of the major sights of Linz, was built in 1517.

In 1815, Linz became part of Prussia. One year later in 1816 Linz received the status of a district town ("Kreisstadt"). This status was revoked in 1822 and Linz became part of the Neuwied county.

After the Second World War, Linz became a part of Rhineland-Palatinate in 1946.

In the 1970s the city expanded with the new residential area "Roniger Hof". In 1979 the local hospital was put into service.

== Gallery ==
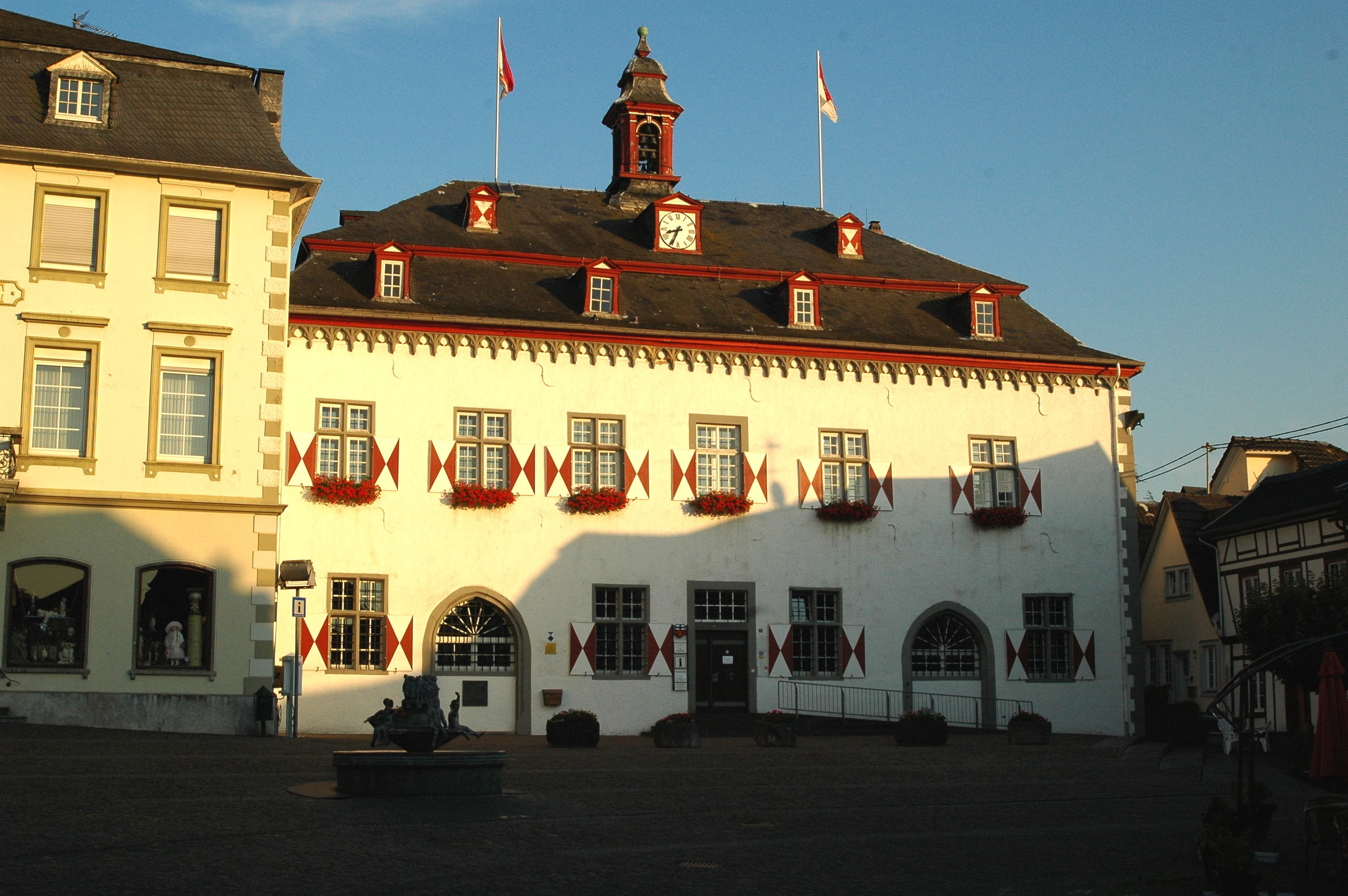
Town hall

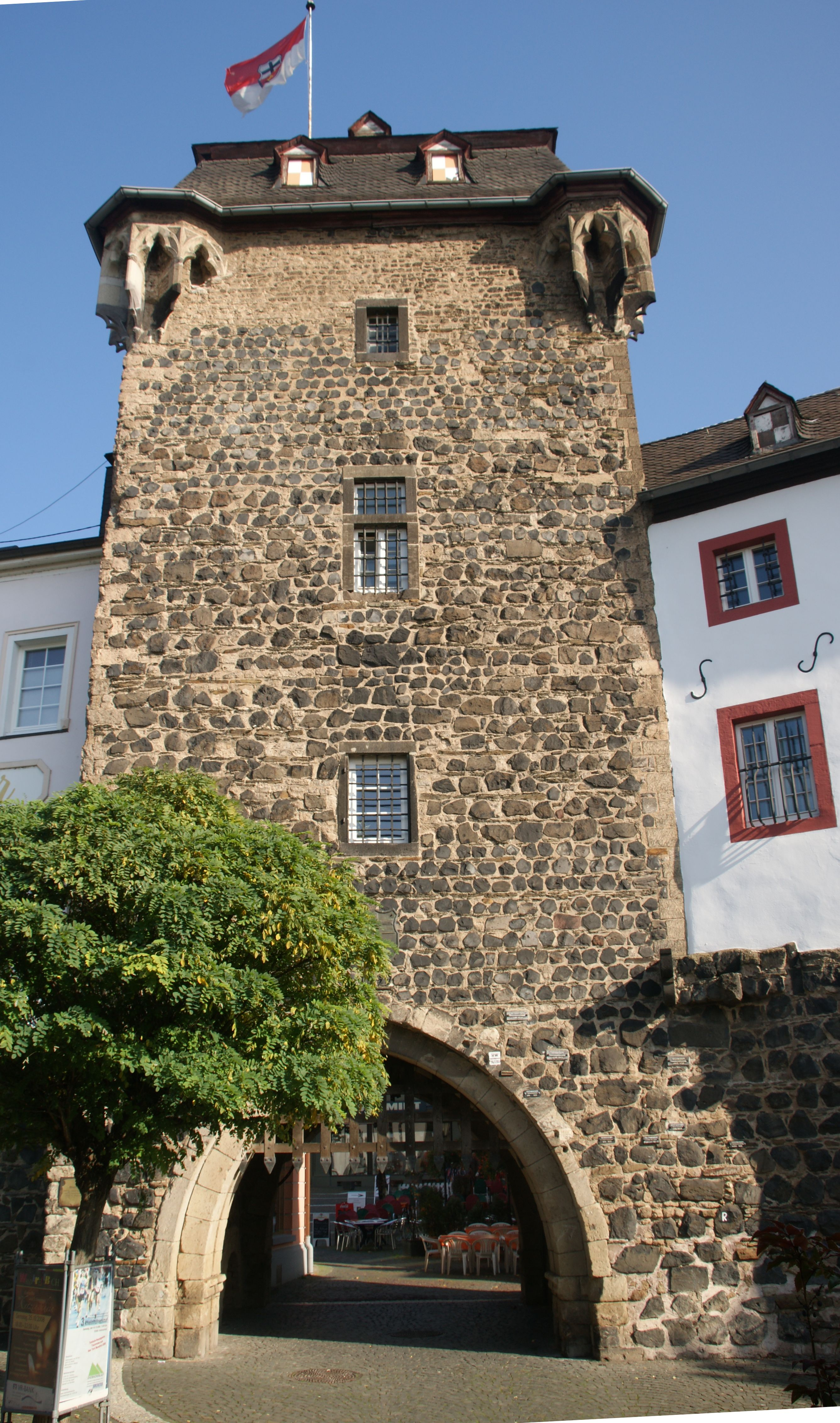
Rhine tower

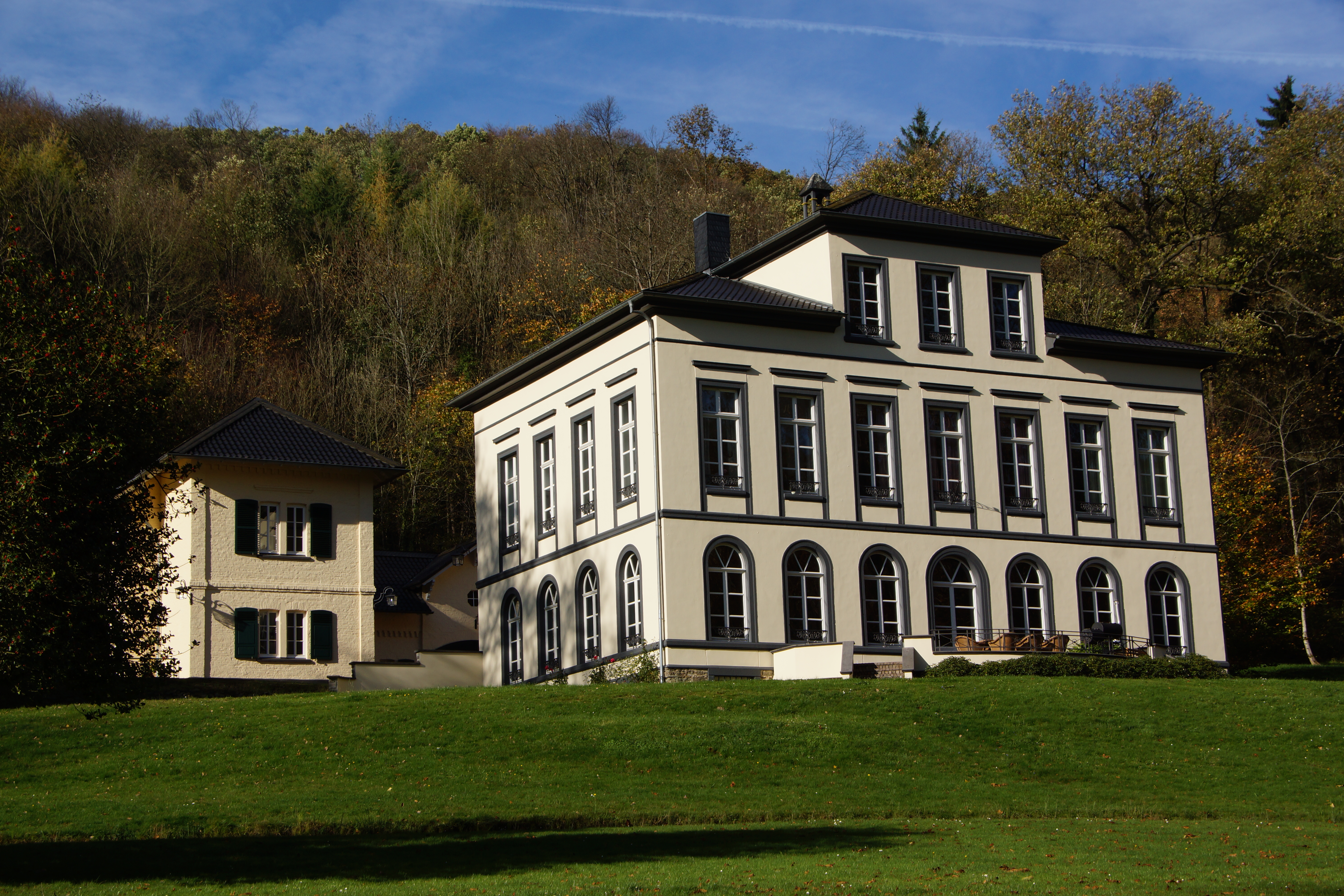
Rennenberg castle

== Mayors ==
- 1812–1813: Engelbert Schwamborn
- 1817–1820: Friedrich Adolph von Cocy
- 1820–1842: Franz Kerp
- 1842–1848: Franz Stephan Christmann
- 1848–1851: Rudolf Jakob von Gerolt zur Leyen
- 1851–1856: Hubert Hubaleck
- 1856: Johann Schmitz
- 1856–1871: Willibrord Thiesen
- 1871–1910: Julius Lerner
- 1910–1914: Hugo Menzel
- 1914–1932: Paul Pieper
- 1933: Eugen Mehliß
- 1933: Rahms (given name unknown)
- 1933–1938: Franz Weyand,
- 1939–1944: Paul Wiezorke
- 1944–1945: Matthias Wagner
- 1945: Franz-Josef Wuermeling, CDU
- 1945–1947: Wilhelm Hoffmann
- 1947–1948: Peter Frings CDU
- 1948–1956: Wilhelm Hoffmann
- 1956–1972: Leo Thönnissen, SPD
- 1972–1974: Theo Lück, SPD
- 1974–1979: Hans Breitenbach, CDU
- 1979–1989: Theo Lück, first SPD, from 1984 FWG
- 1989–2014: Adi Buchwald, CDU
- since 2014: Hans Georg Faust, CDU
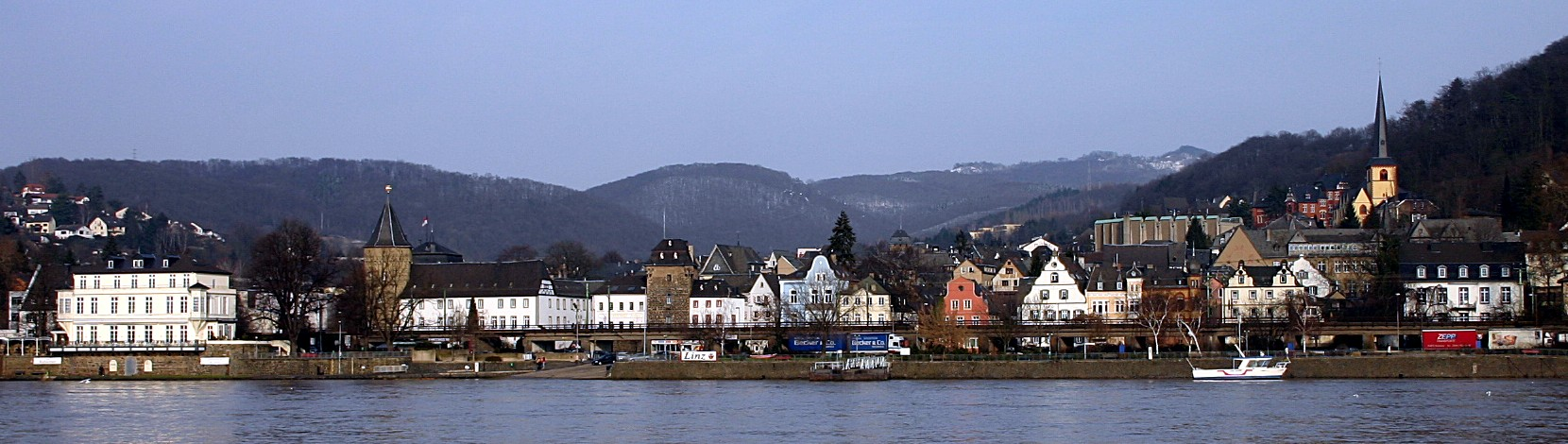
View of Linz

== Notable people ==
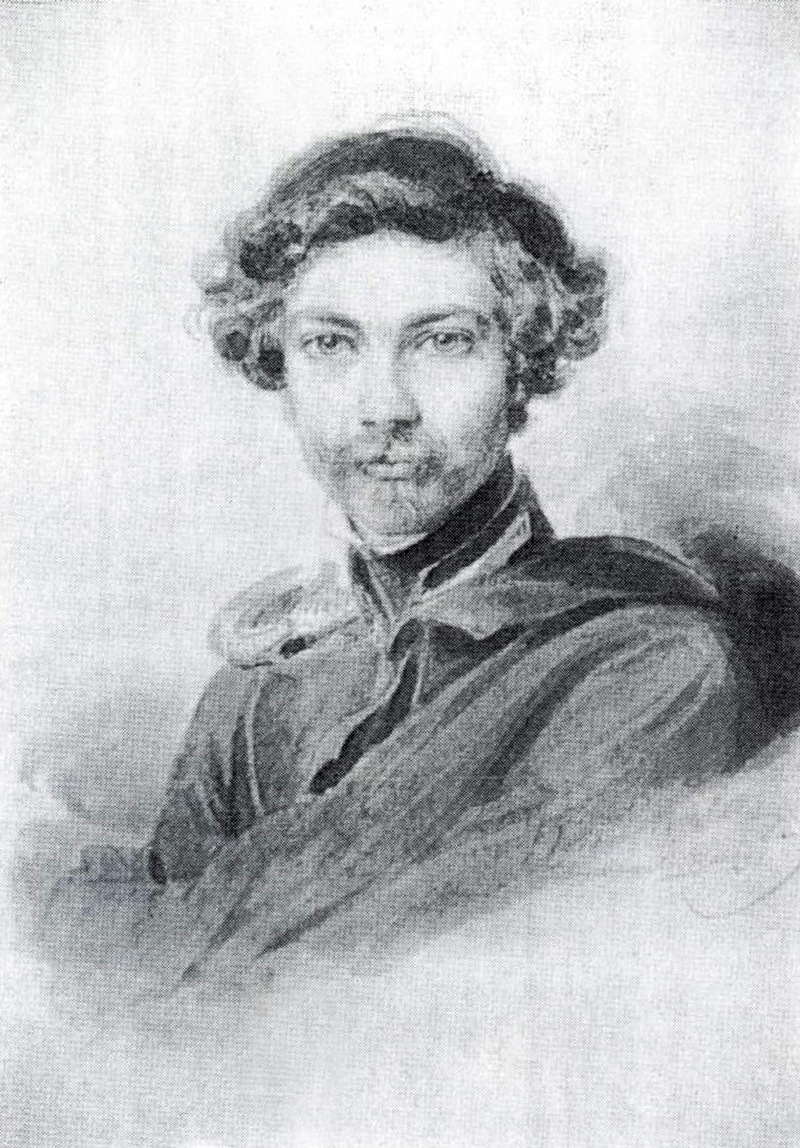
Ferdinand von Malaisé

- Ferdinand von Malaisé (1806-1892); Bavarian General, Educator of King Ludwig III of Bavaria
- Anton Joseph Weidenbach (1809-1871), historian and archivist
- Otto Hoegelow (born in 1895 in Linz am Rhein) was a German SS Hauptscharführer and war criminal.
- Manfred Bruns (1934-2019), Federal Prosecutor at the Federal Court of Justice
- Alex Kempkens (born 1942), photographer
- Osvaldo Bayer (1927-2018), German-Argentine anarchist journalist and historian, resided in the town during the 1976-1983 Argentine Dirty War
- Thomas Bierschenk, (born 1951), German ethnologist and sociologist, Professor of African Cultures and Societies at the Institute for Anthropology and African Studies at the University of Mainz.
- Stefan Thoma (born 1988), politician

== Transport ==
Linz is located on the East Rhine Railway (Rechte Rheinstrecke, Wiesbaden - Koblenz - Bonn - Cologne), which is in use for public and freight transport as well the former Linz (Rhine) - Flammersfeld Railway (Kasbachtalbahn), which currently is out of service, only touristic special train rides take place between Linz and Kalenborn, the section from there to Flammerfeld is primarely deconsteucted.

== Twin towns ==
- Pornic, France - since 1995

== See also ==
- Martinus-Gymnasium Linz
