= Neunkirchen =

Neunkirchen is a common German placename ("[at the] new church"). It may refer to the following places:

== In Austria ==
- Neunkirchen, Austria, the capital of the district Neunkirchen in Lower Austria
- Neunkirchen District, Austria

== In Germany ==
=== Baden-Württemberg ===
- Neunkirchen, Baden-Württemberg, in Neckar-Odenwald district

=== Bavaria ===
- Neunkirchen am Brand, in Forchheim district
- Neunkirchen am Sand, in Nürnberger Land district
- Neunkirchen, Lower Franconia, in Miltenberg district
- A part of Weiden in der Oberpfalz

=== Hesse ===
a district of the municipality Modautal in Hesse, see Modautal#Neunkirchen

=== North Rhine-Westphalia ===
- Neunkirchen (Siegerland), a locality in Siegen-Wittgenstein district
- Neunkirchen-Seelscheid, in Rhein-Sieg district

=== Rhineland-Palatinate ===
- Neunkirchen, Bernkastel-Wittlich, part of the Verbandsgemeinde Thalfang am Erbeskopf in Bernkastel-Wittlich district
- Neunkirchen am Potzberg, part of the Verbandsgemeinde Altenglan in Kusel district
- Neunkirchen, Westerwaldkreis, part of the Verbandsgemeinde Rennerod in Westerwaldkreis

=== Saarland ===
- Neunkirchen, Saarland, capital of the district of Neunkirchen
- Neunkirchen, Nohfelden, a village in Saarland
- Neunkirchen (German district)

== In France ==
- Neunkirchen-lès-Bouzonville, municipality in the Moselle department

== See also ==
- Neukirchen (disambiguation)
- Neuenkirchen (disambiguation)
- Neukirch (disambiguation)
- Neunkirch
