= Lichterfelde =

Lichterfelde may refer to:

- Lichterfelde (Berlin), a locality in the borough of Steglitz-Zehlendorf in Berlin, Germany
- Lichterfelde West, an elegant residential area in Berlin
- Lichterfelde, Saxony-Anhalt, a municipality in the Stendhal District, Germany
- Lichterfelde, a village within the Schorfheide municipality in Brandenburg, Germany
- VfB Lichterfelde, a defunct football club from the Lichterfelde district of Berlin
