= Neuenkirchen =

Neuenkirchen can refer to several municipalities in Germany:

- in Lower Saxony:
  - Neuenkirchen, Cuxhaven, part of the Samtgemeinde Hadeln, district of Cuxhaven
  - Neuenkirchen, Diepholz, part of the Samtgemeinde Schwaförden, district of Diepholz
  - Neuenkirchen, Osnabrück, district of Osnabrück
  - Neuenkirchen (Samtgemeinde), a collective municipality in Osnabrück
  - Neuenkirchen (Lüneburg Heath), Soltau-Fallingbostel district
  - Neuenkirchen, Stade, part of the Samtgemeinde Lühe, district of Stade
  - Neuenkirchen-Vörden, district of Vechta
- in Mecklenburg-Vorpommern:
  - Neuenkirchen, Anklam-Land, part of the Amt Anklam-Land, Vorpommern-Greifswald district
  - Neuenkirchen, Landhagen, part of the Amt Landhagen, Vorpommern-Greifswald district
  - Neuenkirchen, Mecklenburg-Strelitz, part of the Amt Neverin, Mecklenburg-Strelitz district
  - Neuenkirchen, Rügen, part of the Amt West-Rügen, Rügen district
- in North Rhine-Westphalia:
  - Neuenkirchen, Westphalia, district of Steinfurt
  - Neuenkirchen, part of the town Rietberg, district of Gütersloh
- in Schleswig-Holstein:
  - Neuenkirchen, Schleswig-Holstein, part of the Amt Weddingstedt, Dithmarschen district

== See also ==
- Neunkirchen (disambiguation)
- Neukirchen (disambiguation)
- Neukirch (disambiguation)
- Neunkirch
