= Falkenberg, Saxony-Anhalt =

Falkenberg
- Ortsteil of Altmärkische Wische
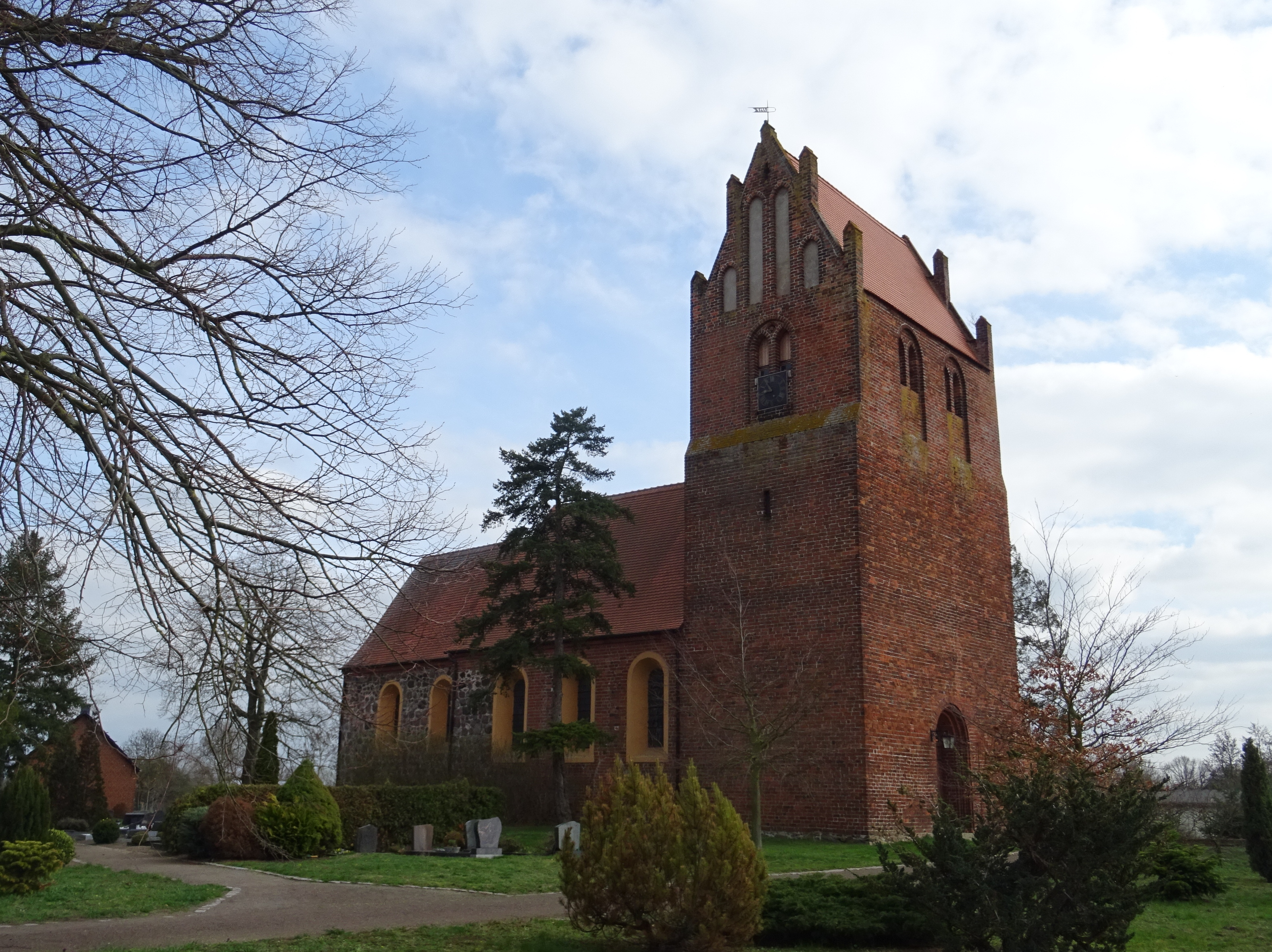
- Interactive map of Falkenberg
- Location within Germany Location within Saxony-Anhalt
- Coordinates: 52°52′N 11°49′E
- Country: Germany
- State: Saxony-Anhalt
- District: Stendal
- Municipality: Altmärkische Wische

Area
  - Total: 15.31 km^{2} (5.91 sq mi)
- Elevation: 21 m (69 ft)

Population (2006-12-31)
  - Total: 253
  - Density: 16.5/km^{2} (42.8/sq mi)
- Time zone: UTC+01:00 (CET)
  - Summer (DST): UTC+02:00 (CEST)
- Postal codes: 39615
- Dialling codes: 039386
- Vehicle registration: SDL
- Website: www.vgem-seehausen.de

Falkenberg (German pronunciation: [ˈfalkŋ̍ˌbɛʁk]) is a village and a former municipality in the district of Stendal, in Saxony-Anhalt, Germany. Since 1 January 2010, it is part of the municipality Altmärkische Wische.

== People from Falkenberg ==
- Friedrich Wilhelm von Bülow (1755-1816), Prussian general
- Dietrich Heinrich von Bülow (1757-1807), Prussian soldier and military writer
