= List of English exonyms for German-speaking places =

This list is a compilation of German toponyms (i.e., names of cities, regions, rivers, mountains and other geographical features situated in a German-speaking area) that have traditional English-language exonyms.

== Usage ==
While in the case of regions, rivers and mountains, English exonyms are the definite choice (not least of all because the features they describe often cross language borders), some lesser-known city exonyms whose difference is merely orthographic and does not affect pronunciation (Cassel, Coblenz, Leipsic, Hanover, Mayence) have begun to retreat in favour of the endonymic forms. The media are divided about the use of the English exonyms Basle, Berne, and Zurich.

The Times Style guide encourages the continued use of Basle and Berne.

Usage may also depend on context; the spelling Kleve could be used in a news story about an incident in that city, but the fourth wife of Henry VIII of England is always referred to in English as Anne of Cleves, never Anne of Kleve.

Exonyms that are used exclusively in historical and/or ecclesiastical contexts are marked in italics.

== List ==
| English name | German name | Country(s) | Notes |
|---|---|---|---|
| Aix-la-Chapelle | Aachen | | |
| Alsace | Elsaß | | |
| Alsatia | Elsaß | | |
| Altkirk | Altkirch | | |
| Argovia | Aargau | | |
| Arlon | Arel | | |
| Arrow | Aarau | | |
| Augsburgh | Augsburg | | |
| Austria | Österreich | | |
| Baltic Sea | Ostsee | Denmark, Germany, Poland, Lithuania, Latvia, Estonia, Russia, Finland, Sweden | |
| Basil | Basel | | |
| Basle | Basel | | |
| Bavaria | Bayern | | |
| Berne | Bern | | |
| Blenheim | Blindheim | | |
| Bolzano | Bo(t)zen | Italy | |
| Brandenburgh | Brandenburg | | |
| Brigg | Brig | Switzerland | |
| Brisgow | Breisgau | | |
| Brunswick | Braunschweig | | |
| Carinthia | Kärnten | Austria | |
| Cassel | Kassel | | |
| Cleves | Kleve | | |
| Coblence | Koblenz | | |
| Coblen(t)z | Koblenz | | |
| Coleyn | Köln | | |
| Cologne | Köln | | |
| Constance | Konstanz | | |
| Corbach | Korbach | | |
| Dantwich (Gdańsk) | Danzig | Poland | |
| Dantzic (Gdańsk) | Danzig | Poland | |
| Dantzig (Gdańsk) | Danzig | Poland | |
| Danube | Donau | Germany, Austria, Slovakia, Hungary, Croatia, Serbia, Bulgaria, Romania, Moldova, Ukraine | |
| Dessaw | Dessau | | |
| Dettingham | Dettingen | | |
| Dinkespithel | Dinkesbühl | | |
| Ditmarsh | Dithmarschen | | |
| Doesburgh | Duisburg | | |
| Donow(e) (Danube) | Donau | | |
| Doverbishopsham | Tauberbischofsheim | | |
| Durlack | Durlach | | |
| Eastphalia | Ostfalen | | |
| Elwang | Ellwangen | | |
| Embden | Emden | | |
| Embs | Ems | | |
| Emms | Ems | | |
| Erford | Erfurt | | |
| Farther Pomerania | Hinterpommern | | |
| Franconia | Franken | | |
| Frankford | Frankfurt (am Main) | | |
| Friseland | Friesland | Netherlands, Germany | |
| Frisia | Friesland | Netherlands, Germany | |
| Fribergh | Freiberg | | |
| Frib(o)urg | Freiburg | | |
| Friburgh | Freiburg | | |
| Fuld | Fulda | | |
| German Ocean | Nordsee | | |
| Germany | Deutschland | | |
| Ginlick | Jülich | | |
| Glaris | Glarus | | |
| Glogaw | Glogau | | |
| Gower | Sankt Goar | | |
| Graybound | Graubünden | | |
| Gripswald | Greifswald | | |
| Grisons | Graubünden | | |
| Gu(i)lick | Jülich | | |
| Hailbron | Heilbronn | | |
| Hamburgh | Hamburg | | |
| Hamelin | Hameln | | |
| Hanover | Hannover | | |
| Hagenaw | Hagenau | | |
| Heligoland | Helgoland | | |
| Hesse | Hessen | | |
| Hither Pomerania | Vorpommern | | |
| Holsatia | Holstein | | |
| Horsemarket | Rossmar(c)k(t) | | |
| Juliers | Jülich | | |
| Lake Constance | Bodensee | Germany, Austria, Switzerland | |
| Lake of Lucerne | Vierwaldstättersee | | |
| Leipsic | Leipzig | | |
| Lewenburgh | Lauenburg | | |
| Lindaw | Lindau | | |
| Lints | Lintz | | |
| Lippenham | Bislich | | |
| Lipswick | Leipzig | | |
| Lorraine | Lothringen | | |
| Lucerne | Luzern | Switzerland | |
| Lunenburg(h) | Lüneburg | | |
| Lusatia | Lausitz | | |
| Luxembourg | Luxemburg | | |
| Luxemburgh | Luxemburg | | |
| Lyppe | Lippe | | |
| Magedeburgh | Magdeburg | | |
| Maidenburgh | Magdeburg | | |
| Malmedy | Malmünd | Belgium | |
| Mansfield | Mansfeld | | |
| Marborow | Marburg | | |
| Mayence | Mainz | | |
| Mecklenburgh | Mecklenburg | | |
| Mentz | Kumainz; Mainz | | |
| Mersburgh | Merseburg | | |
| Munich | München | | |
| Necker | Neckar | | |
| Nidwald | Nidwalden | | |
| Nuremberg | Nürnberg | | |
| Obwald | Obwalden | | |
| Ore Mountains | Erzgebirge | | |
| Palatinate | Pfalz | | |
| Pomerania | Pommern | | |
| Pommerland | Pommern | | |
| Pruce | Preußen | | |
| Pruss | Preußen | | |
| Prussia | Preußen | | |
| Passaw | Passau | | |
| Ratisbon | Regensburg | | |
| Rhenish | Rheinish | | |
| Rhine | Rhein | Switzerland, Liechtenstein, Austria, Germany, France, Netherlands | |
| Rugia | Rügen | | |
| Saltsburgh | Salzburg | Austria | |
| Saxony | Sachsen | | |
| Schaffhouse | Schaffhausen | | |
| Silesia | Schlesien | Poland | |
| Sleswick | Schleswig | | |
| Soleure | Solothurn | | |
| Spaw(e) | Spa (Spau) | Belgium | |
| Spire(s) | Speyer | | |
| Strasburgh (Strasbourg) | Straßburg | France | |
| Stuttgardt | Stuttgart | | |
| Swabia | Schwaben | | |
| Swalback | Bad Schwalbach | | |
| Swiss Saxony | Sächsische Schweiz | | German name means "Saxon Switzerland" |
| Switzerland | Schweiz | | |
| Swizzerland | Schweiz | | |
| Thurgovia | Thurgau | | |
| Thuringia | Thüringen | | |
| Treves | Triers | | |
| Triers | Trier | | |
| Tyrol | Tirol | | |
| Vienna | Wien | Austria | |
| Waimes | Weismes | | |
| Western Pomerania | Vorpommern | | |
| Westphalia | Westfalen | | |
| Westrick | Westreich | | |
| Wirtemberg | Württemberg | | |
| Wilne (Vilnius) | Wilna | Lithuania | |
| Wurtemberg | Württemberg | | |
| Wurzburgh | Würzburg | | |

== See also ==
- Endonym and exonym
- German exonyms
- German names for Central European towns
- German placename etymology
- List of European exonyms
- Names for Germany
- Toponomy
