= Martinus-Gymnasium Linz =

Coordinates: 50°34′11″N 7°16′56″E

The Martinus-Gymnasium Linz (MGL) is a public Gymnasium (High School) in Linz/Rhine, Germany. The educational establishment has more than 900 pupils (aged 11–19) and about 70 teachers. Founded over 300 years ago, the Martinus-Gymnasium is one of the oldest schools in Rhineland-Palatinate. It is named after Saint Martin of Tours who is its patron. Currently there is no headmaster but a substitutional headmaster.

== History ==
The school was founded in 1706 as a grammar school named Studium Martinianum (later Gymnasium Martinianum). Modern Languages have been taught at the Martinus-Gymnasium since 1817.

The changes the French Revolution had caused in Germany and Europe forced the school to close for two year but soon it was re-opened in 1817.

The first female student who graduated was mentioned in 1923.

During the Second World War the school closed again for one year (1944/45) and was used as a military hospital.

On moving to a new building in 1967, teachers, parents and students chose the name Martinus-Gymnasium.

In 1974 the school established the system of the Mainzer-Studien-Stufe (MSS).

In 2006 Martinus-Gymnasium celebrated its 300th anniversary.

== Curriculum ==
Subjects available:

- English, French or Latin, Italian (fakultative)
- German (language and literature)
- Mathematics
- History, Politics, Geography
- Physics, Biology, Chemistry
- Religious Education or Ethics Studies
- Art, Music
- Sports
- Philosophy (fakultative)
- Computing (fakultative)

== Mainzer-Studien-Stufe (MSS) ==
After students have finished 10 years of school in Rhineland- Palatinate, they attend the "MSS". There, pupils have to choose three A-level classes, which are given in specific combinations. Furthermore, six other subjects are chosen in order to legitimate for MSS. Overall, the MSS takes two and a half years, where, afterwards, pupils take their final exam in their three A- Levels, as well hold an oral exam in their fourth examination subject. The graduation known as Abitur in Germany, legitimates one to study at a university.

== Extracurricular activities ==
Music: School Choir, Big Band, Guitar Playing

Sports: Football (soccer), basketball, Tabletennis, Swimming, Athletics, Badminton, Handball, Marathon

The sport teams take part in several local competitions every year.

Others: Pupil Magazine, Drama, Greek, Spanish

== Exchange programs ==
- England: Norwich School (King Edward VI’s Grammar School)
- USA: High School in Marietta, Georgia (every two years)
- Italy: Monticello Brianza
- France: Pornic, Collège et Lycée Privés Mixtes St.-Joseph du Loquidy

== Some Facts ==
- School day begins at Martinus-Gymnasium at 07:55 am and can last for the higher classes until 05:15 pm (depends on schedule).
- On Friday and Tuesday school ends for everybody at 1:10pm.
- On Saturday after November 11 (Saint Martin) the lower classes organize a school celebration. One week later there is another one for the higher classes where usually local rock bands perform on stage. Both events raise money for charity projects.
- In Germany you get two school reports each year. One in January and the other one when the school year ends in June/July. The last one decides whether you passed or you have to do the year again.
- The graduating class has to finance and organize the prom night on its own. So they sell cake in school and arrange events to raise money for it.
- Every graduating class has its own motto which is usually playing with the word Abitur.

Example: Abipfiff! instead of Abpfiff! which means final whistle.
