= Linz Castle =

Castle in Linz am Rhine, Germany

Coordinates: 50°33′58″N 7°16′43″E

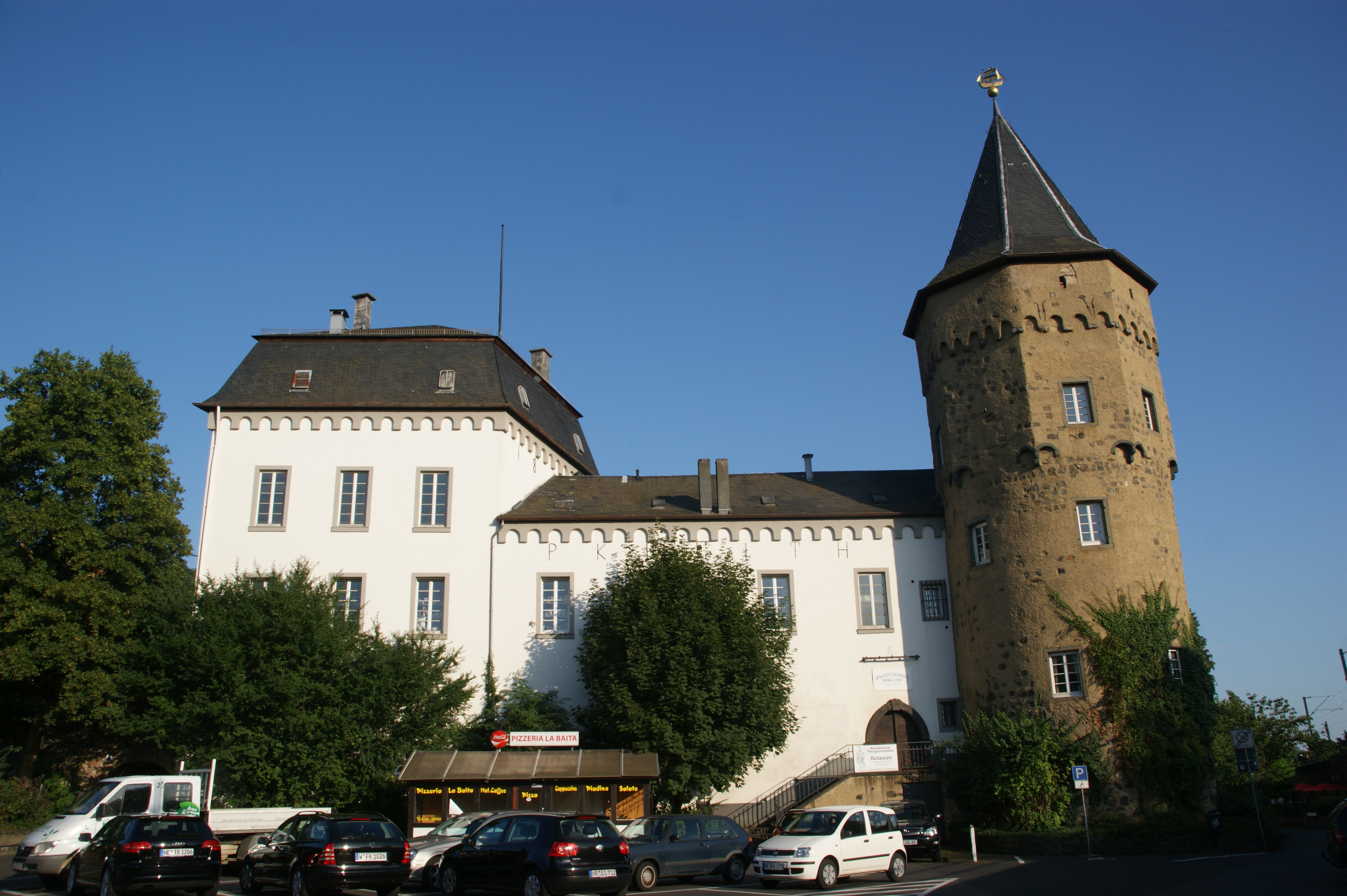
Castle of Linz am Rhein

The Castle of Linz (German: Burg Linz) is a castle in Linz am Rhein, Germany, built between 1364 and 1368 by Heinrich von Virneburg, who was the archbishop of Cologne at the time. The main function of the castle was to collect river tolls. During the Neuss War in 1475, the castle was besieged and badly damaged. From 1811 to 1851, it served as a prison. The castle lost its importance when the town of Linz am Rhein was sold to Prussia in 1820. In 1942–1945, during the Second World War, the castle was once again used as a prison. The structure today is now privately owned and used as a public venue.
