= Stefan Thoma =

German politician (born 1988)

Member of the Landtag of Rhineland-Palatinate
- In office 5 March 2025 – 18 May 2026
- Preceded by: Herbert Mertin

Personal details
- Born: 13 July 1988 (age 38) Linz am Rhein
- Party: Free Democratic Party (since 2017)

Stefan Thoma (born 13 July 1988 in Linz am Rhein) is a German politician serving as chairman of the Free Democratic Party in Rhineland-Palatinate since 2026. From 2025 to 2026, he was a member of the Landtag of Rhineland-Palatinate.
