= Friedrich Wilhelm Freiherr von Bülow =

Prussian general (1755–1816)

Friedrich Wilhelm Freiherr von Bülow Graf von Dennewitz
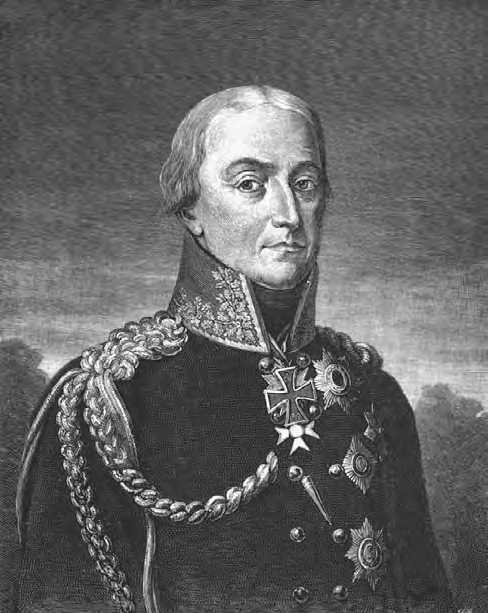
- Born: 16 February 1755; Falkenberg
- Died: 25 February 1816 (aged 61); Königsberg, Kingdom of Prussia
- Relatives: Dietrich Heinrich von Bülow (brother)
- Military career
- Allegiance: Prussia
- Branch: Prussian Army
- Service years: 1768–1816
- Rank: General of the Infantry
- Conflicts: Expand list: War of the Bavarian Succession; War of the First Coalition; Siege of Mainz; Napoleonic Wars; War of the Fourth Coalition; Battle of Waltersdorf [?] (Note: In his summary of "France's greatest victories over Prussia", Bodart claims (page 682) that Ney defeated Bülow at Waltersdorf in 1807, but in his record of that battle itself on page 379, he claims that Ney's 10,000 men defeated Major General de:Karl Ludwig Ferdinand von Klüchtzner's 4,500-strong force.); War of the Sixth Coalition; Battle of Halle (1813); Battle of Luckau; Battle of Großbeeren; Battle of Dennewitz; Battle of Leipzig; Battle of Arnhem; Battle of Hoogstraten; Battle of Merxem; Battle of Laon; War of the Seventh Coalition; Battle of Waterloo; Battle of Plancenoit; Invasion of France
- Awards: Pour le Mérite; Order of the Sword

Friedrich Wilhelm Freiherr von Bülow, Graf von Dennewitz (16 February 1755 – 25 February 1816) was a Prussian general of the Napoleonic Wars. Commanding various Allied forces during the War of the Sixth Coalition (1813–1814), (Note: Including Russians at Luckau and British at Hoogstraten and Merxem. All victorious battles.) Bülow won every – at least major – military engagement. He received the victory title Graf von Dennewitz, 'Count of Dennewitz', for saving Berlin at the eponymous village (1813). His corps also played a crucial role at Waterloo: it was Bülow's corps that fought for and eventually captured Plancenoit, which was defended, notably, by the French Imperial Guard (1815).

== Biography ==
=== Early life ===
Bülow was born in Falkenberg, in the Altmark, and was the elder brother of Freiherr Dietrich Heinrich von Bülow. A member of the noble Bülow family, he received an excellent education, and entered the Prussian army in 1768, becoming ensign in 1772, and second lieutenant in 1775. He took part in the War of the Bavarian Succession of 1778, and subsequently devoted himself to the study of his profession and of the sciences and arts.

Throughout his life, Bülow was devoted to music, his great musical ability bringing him to the notice of King Frederick William II of Prussia, and c. 1790 he was conspicuous in the most fashionable circles of Berlin. He did not, however, neglect his military studies, and in 1792 he was made military instructor to the young Prince Louis Ferdinand of Prussia, becoming at the same time full captain. He took part in the campaigns of 1792–94 on the Rhine, and received for signal courage during the siege of Mainz the order Pour le Mérite and promotion to the rank of major.

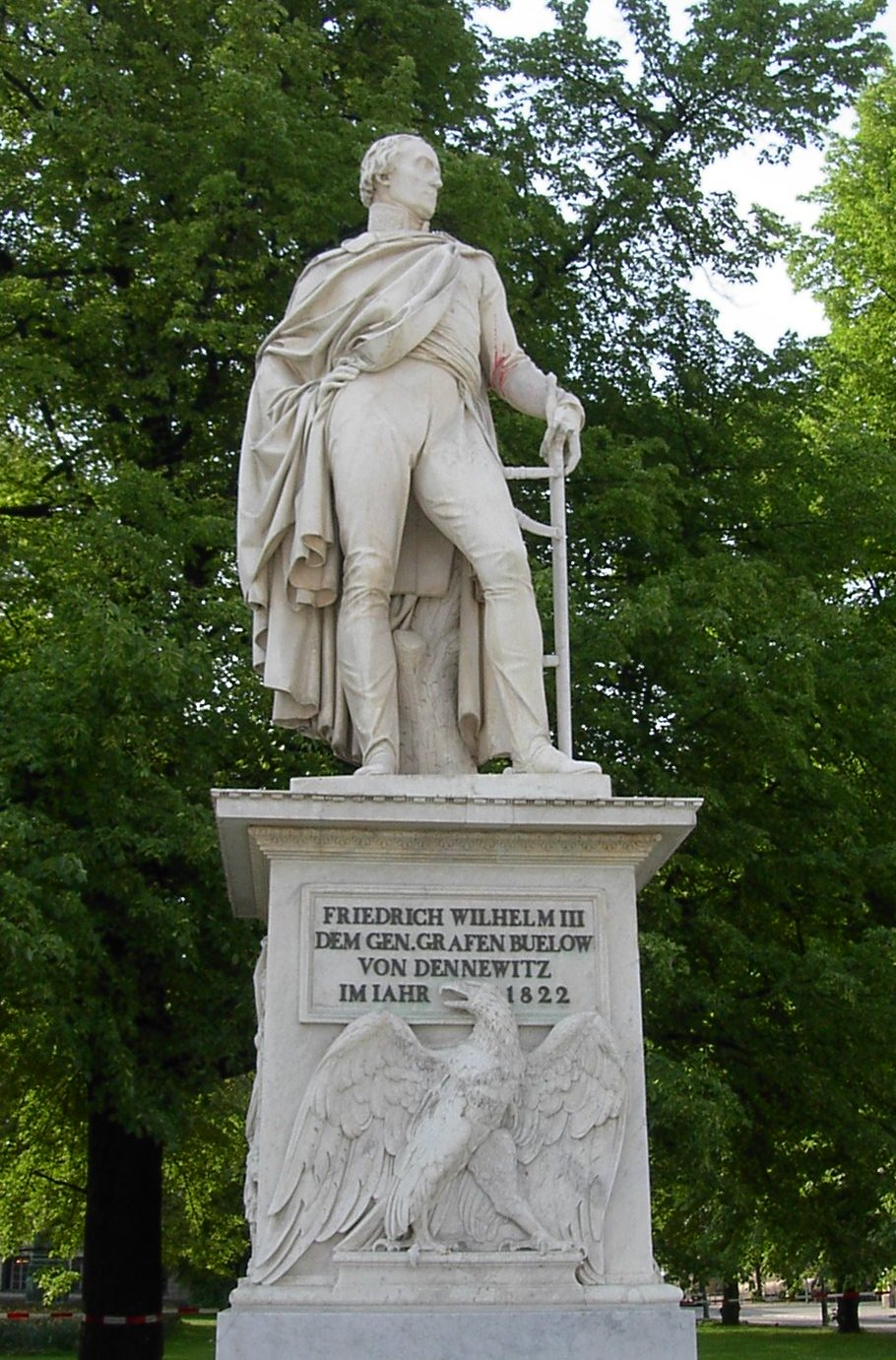
Statue of Bülow, on the Unter den Linden, Berlin.

After this Bülow went to garrison duty at Soldau. In 1802, he married Auguste Marianne, the daughter of Colonel von Auer, and in the following year he became lieutenant-colonel, remaining at Soldau with his corps. The vagaries and misfortunes of his brother Dietrich affected his happiness as well as his fortune. The loss of two of his children was followed in 1806 by the death of his wife, and a further source of disappointment was the exclusion of his regiment from the field army sent against Napoleon in 1806. The disasters of the campaign aroused his energies. He did excellent service under Anton Wilhelm von L'Estocq's command in the latter part of the war, was wounded in action, and finally designated for a brigade command in Field Marshal Gebhard Leberecht von Blücher's force.

In 1808, Bülow married the sister of his first wife Pauline Juliane. He was made a major-general in the same year, and henceforward he devoted himself wholly to the regeneration of Prussia. The intensity of his patriotism threw him into conflict even with Blücher and led to his temporary retirement; in 1811, however, he was again employed.

=== War of the Sixth Coalition ===
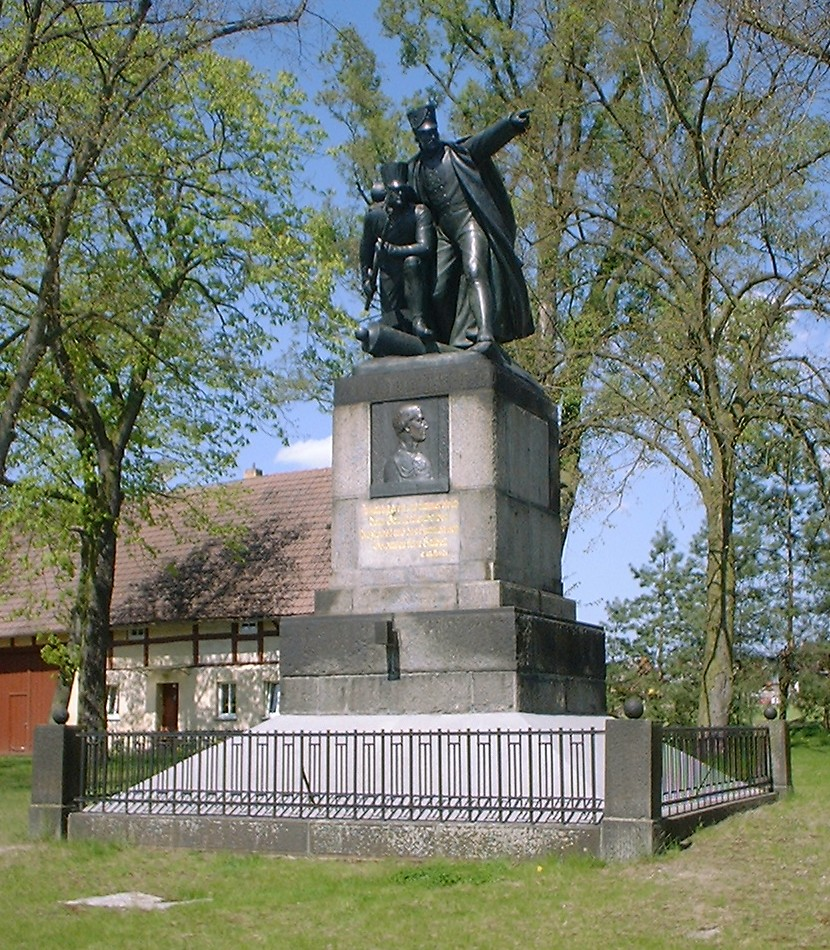
Bülow memorial in Dennewitz

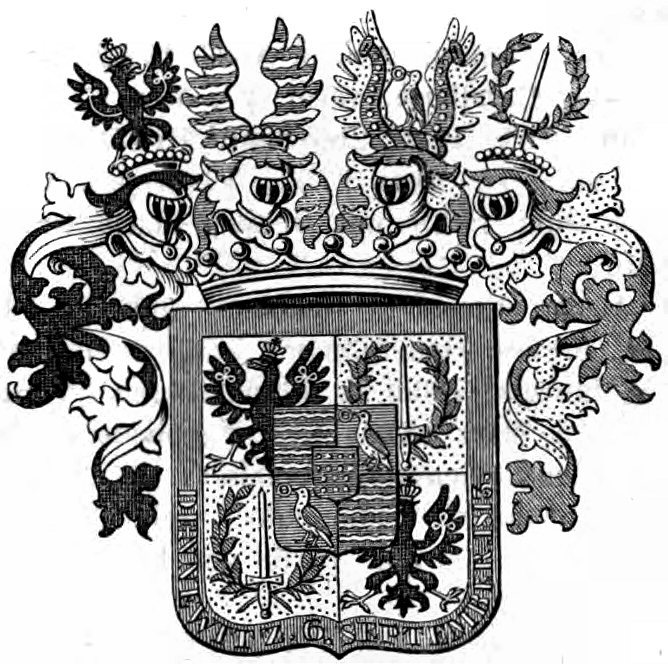
Arms of Count Bülow von Dennewitz, 1814

In the critical days preceding the War of the Sixth Coalition, Bülow kept his troops in hand without committing himself to any irrevocable step until the decision was made. On 14 March 1813, he was made a lieutenant-general. He fought against Marshal Oudinot in defence of Berlin and defeated him at the Battle of Luckau. In the summer he came under the command of Bernadotte, crown prince of Sweden.

At the head of an army corps, Bülow distinguished himself greatly in the Battle of Großbeeren, a victory which was attributed almost entirely to his leadership. A little later, he won the great victory at the Battle of Dennewitz, which for the second time checked Napoleon's advance on Berlin. This inspired the greatest enthusiasm in Prussia, as being won by mainly Prussian forces, and rendered Bülow's popularity almost equal to that of Blücher.

For his superb generalship and courage during the Battle of Großbeeren, von Bülow was awarded the Grand Cross of the Swedish Order of the Sword on the battlefield by Crown Prince Bernadotte and was subsequently ennobled as Graf von Dennewitz by the King of Prussia.

Bülow's corps played a conspicuous part in the final overthrow of Napoleon at Leipzig, and he was then entrusted with the task of evicting the French from Holland and Belgium. In an almost uniformly successful campaign, he won a signal victory at Hoogstraten, although he was fortunate to be supported, often very significantly, by the British General Thomas Graham, second in command to Lord Wellington. In the campaign of 1814, he invaded France from the north-west, joined Blücher, and took part in the brilliant victory of Laon in March. He was made general of infantry and received the title of Count Bülow von Dennewitz. He also took part in the Allied sovereigns' visit to England in June 1814.

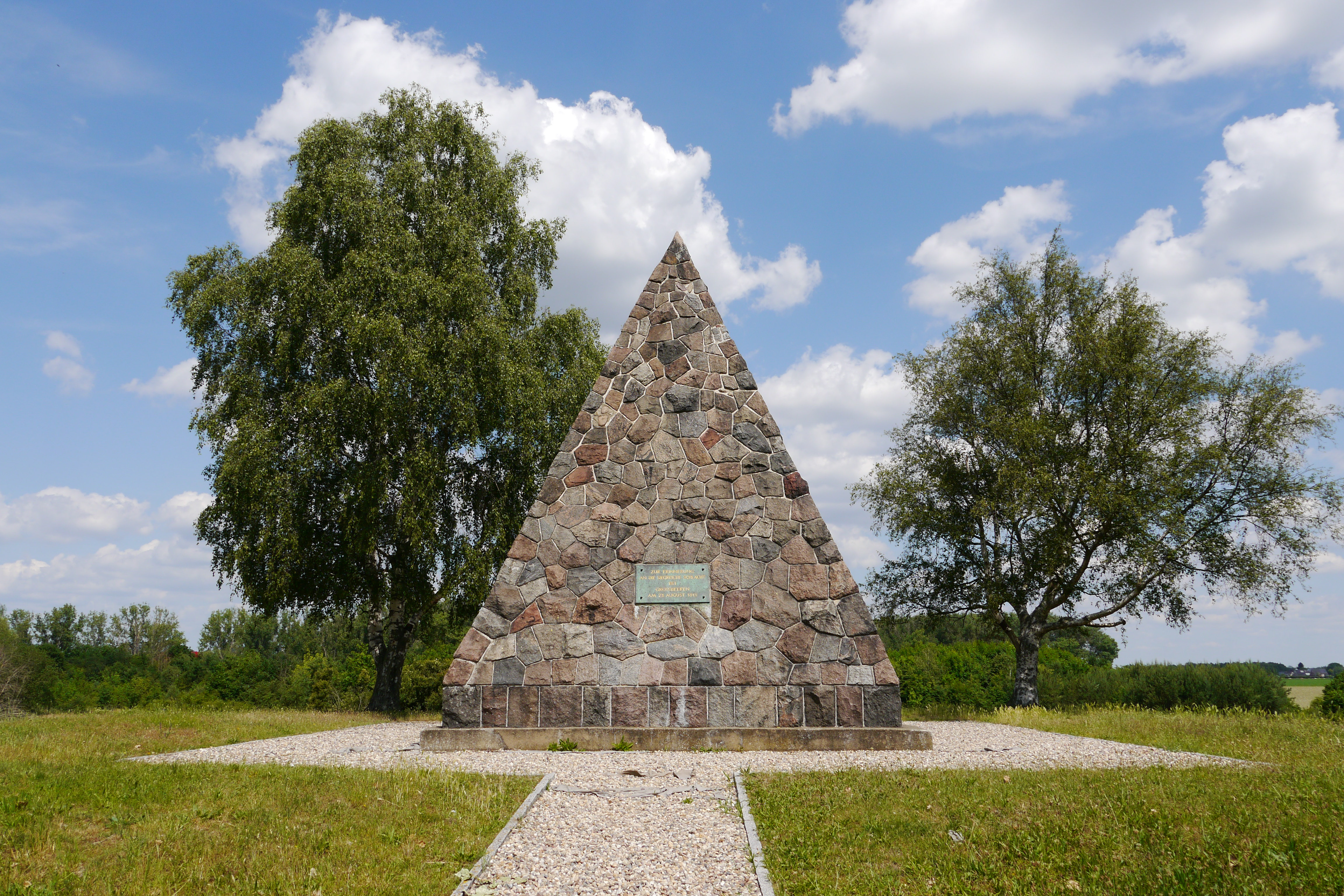
Commemorating pyramid in Großbeeren

=== Waterloo campaign ===
In the short peace of 1814–1815, Bülow was at Königsberg as commander-in-chief in Prussia proper. He was soon called to the field again, and in the Waterloo campaign commanded the IV Corps of Blücher's army. He was not present at Ligny, but his corps headed the flank attack upon Napoleon at the Battle of Waterloo, and bore the heaviest part in the fighting of the Prussian troops around Plancenoit. He took part in the invasion of France, but died suddenly on 25 February 1816, a month after his return to the Königsberg command.
