= Altmärkische Wische =

- Municipality
- Coat of arms

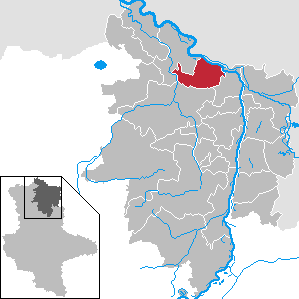
- Location of Altmärkische Wische within Stendal district
- Interactive map of Altmärkische Wische
- Location within Germany Location within Saxony-Anhalt
- Coordinates: 52°52′N 11°52′E
- Country: Germany
- State: Saxony-Anhalt
- District: Stendal
- Municipal assoc.: Seehausen

Government
  - Mayor (2018–25): Willi Hamann

Area
  - Total: 67.09 km^{2} (25.90 sq mi)
- Elevation: 32 m (105 ft)

Population (2025-12-31)
  - Total: 827
  - Density: 12.3/km^{2} (31.9/sq mi)
- Time zone: UTC+01:00 (CET)
  - Summer (DST): UTC+02:00 (CEST)
- Postal codes: 39615
- Dialling codes: 039386, 039393, 039396
- Vehicle registration: SDL

Altmärkische Wische (German pronunciation: [ˈaltˌmɛʁkɪʃə ˈvɪʃə], lit. 'Altmarkian Wische') is a municipality in the district of Stendal, in Saxony-Anhalt, Germany. It was formed on 1 January 2010 by the merger of the former municipalities Falkenberg, Lichterfelde, Neukirchen and Wendemark.
