= German names for Central European towns =

Many places in Central Europe, mostly in the former German Empire and Austria-Hungary but now in non-German-speaking countries, traditionally had names in the German language. Many such names have been used for centuries by the German presence in the area dating back to Ostsiedlung, while some others were simply German transliterations of local names or names invented in the 19th and 20th centuries.

The former was the case with towns inhabited by Germans since the early Middle Ages until the end of Second World War, for instance Breslau, Eger, Hermannstadt or Stettin. The latter was the case of, for instance, Polish towns annexed by Prussia or Austria after the Partitions of Poland, like Chodziesen, Jarotschin or Hohensalza or in annexed Bosnia and Herzegovina.

In some cases, especially in Eastern Central Europe, towns or cities were inhabited by significant numbers of members of two or more ethnic groups, including Germans. As long as the places were part of Germany or Austria-Hungary, these German names were used invariably in German – and usually in English and most other languages too – while the local Slavic, Magyar, or Romanian inhabitants used their own names for the places in question.

After World War II, when the German population of this region was largely expelled, the German names gradually fell into disuse in German and other languages, especially for the minor towns. New Slavic names were adopted to replace names of German origin. In Poland, the Commission for the Determination of Place Names determined new names throughout the newly acquired lands, most often by reverting to a previous Slavic name, but often inventing new names.

German names of major cities like Danzig, Königsberg or Breslau are still recognizable and frequently used in Germany (Danzig about half the time; Breslau somewhat less). In only a few cases, the use of the German name persists invariably, i.e. in the case of capital cities like Prague or Warsaw, which are almost exclusively referred to by their German names (Prag, Warschau), just as they have separate names in English and other languages.

== Relevant countries ==
- Bosnia and Herzegovina
- Croatia
- Czech Republic
- Denmark (South Jutland County)
- Estonia
- France (Alsace and Lorraine)
- Hungary
- Italy (South Tyrol)
- Latvia
- Lithuania
- Poland
- Romania (Transylvania)
- Russia (Kaliningrad Oblast)
- Serbia (Vojvodina)
- Slovakia
- Slovenia
- Ukraine

== See also ==
- Endonym and exonym
- German exonyms
- German placename etymology
- List of English exonyms for German toponyms
- List of European exonyms
