= Wendemark =

Village in Germany

- Ortsteil of Altmärkische Wische
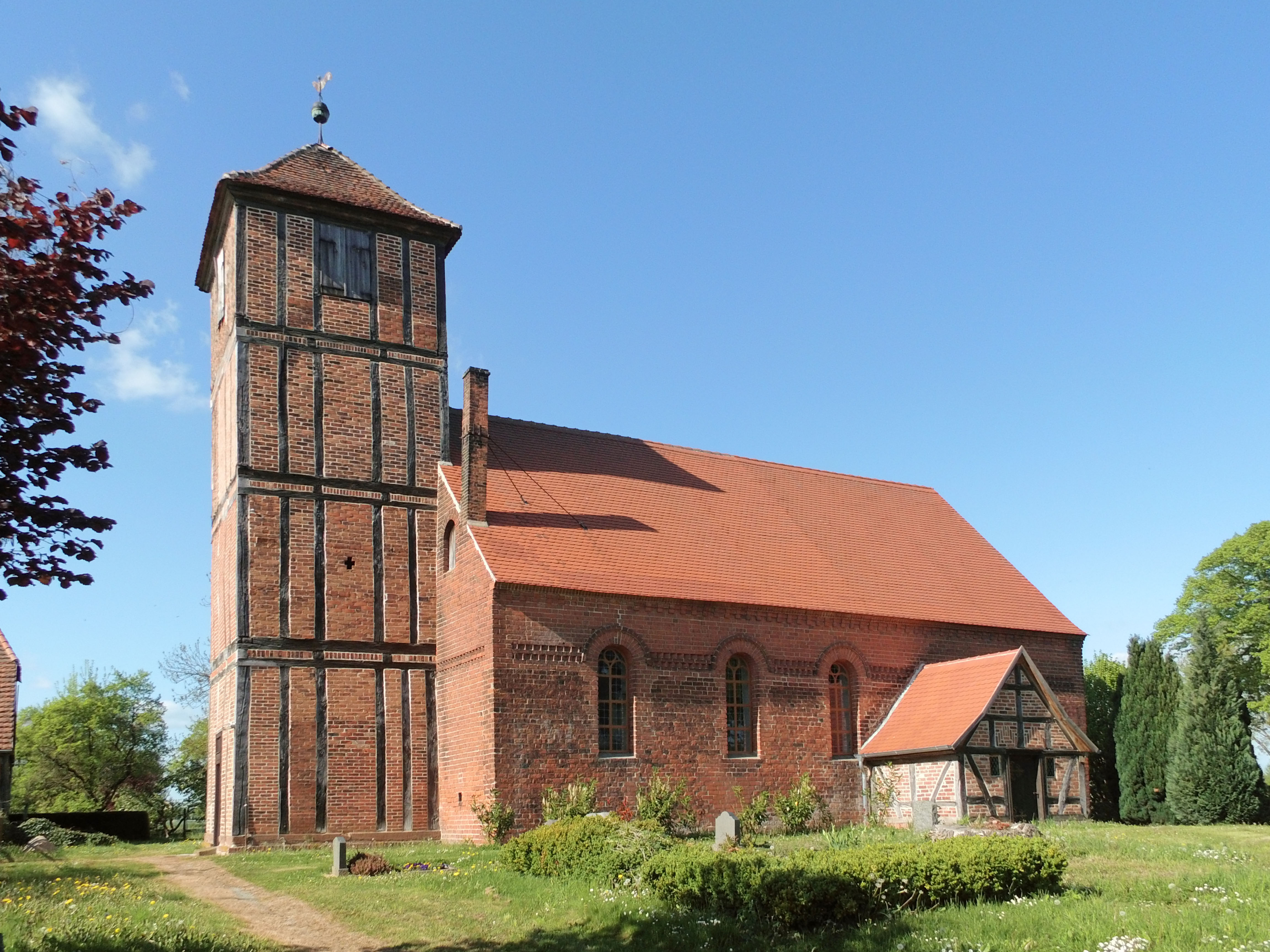
- Protestant Church in Wendemark.

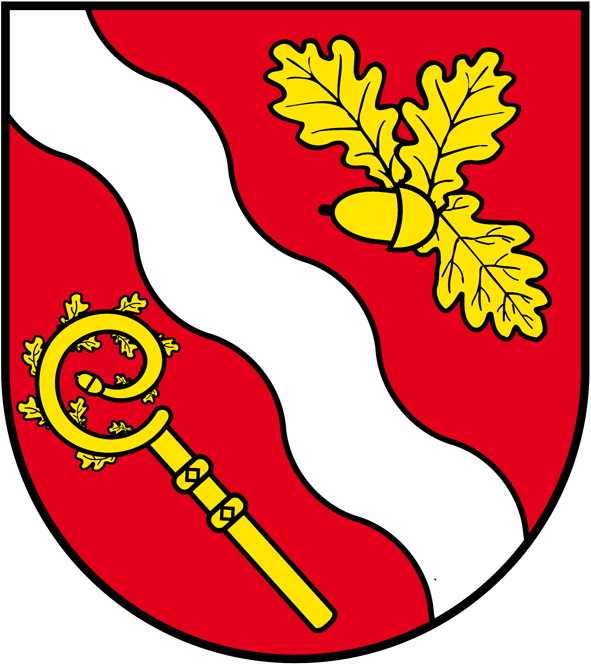
- Coat of arms
- Interactive map of Wendemark
- Location within Germany Location within Saxony-Anhalt
- Coordinates: 52°52′N 11°55′E
- Country: Germany
- State: Saxony-Anhalt
- District: Stendal
- Municipality: Altmärkische Wische

Area
  - Total: 19.18 km^{2} (7.41 sq mi)
- Elevation: 23 m (75 ft)

Population (2006-12-31)
  - Total: 234
  - Density: 12.2/km^{2} (31.6/sq mi)
- Time zone: UTC+01:00 (CET)
  - Summer (DST): UTC+02:00 (CEST)
- Postal codes: 39615
- Dialling codes: 039393
- Vehicle registration: SDL
- Website: www.vgem-seehausen.de

Wendemark (German pronunciation: [ˈvɛndəˌmaʁk]) is a village and former municipality in the district of Stendal, in Saxony-Anhalt, Germany. Since 1 January 2010, it is part of the municipality of Altmärkische Wische. The state road L2 runs through Wendemark to Werben.
