= Neukirchen =

Neukirchen may refer to:

== People ==
- Heinz Neukirchen (1915 – 1986), German naval officer and author

== Places in Austria ==
- Neukirchen an der Enknach, in the Braunau am Inn district, Upper Austria
- Neukirchen am Walde, in the Grieskirchen district, Upper Austria
- Neukirchen an der Vöckla, in the Vöcklabruck district, Upper Austria
- Neukirchen bei Lambach, in the Wels-Land district, Upper Austria
- Neukirchen am Ostrong, a part of Pöggstall, Lower Austria
- Neukirchen (Brunn an der Wild), a part of Brunn an der Wild, Lower Austria
- Neukirchen am Großvenediger, Salzburgerland

== Places in Germany ==
=== Bavaria ===
- Neukirchen, Lower Bavaria, in the Straubing-Bogen district
- Neukirchen-Balbini, in the Schwandorf district
- Neukirchen beim Heiligen Blut, in the Cham district
- Neukirchen bei Sulzbach-Rosenberg, in the Amberg-Sulzbach district
- Neukirchen vorm Wald, in the Passau district
- Neukirchen an der Alz, a locality of Kirchweidach in the Altötting district
- Neukirchen bei Ansbach, a part of Sachsen bei Ansbach in the Ansbach district
- Neukirchen bei Erding, a locality in the Erding district

=== Hesse ===
- Neukirchen, Hesse, a city in the Schwalm-Eder-Kreis district

=== North Rhine-Westphalia ===
- Neukirchen-Vluyn, a city in the Wesel district

=== Saxony ===
- Neukirchen, Erzgebirgskreis, in the Erzgebirgskreis district
- Neukirchen, Zwickau, in the Zwickau district

=== Saxony-Anhalt ===
- Neukirchen, Saxony-Anhalt, a town in the district of Stendal

=== Schleswig-Holstein ===
- Neukirchen, Nordfriesland, part of the Amt Südtondern
- Neukirchen, Ostholstein, part of the Amt Oldenburg-Land
- A locality of Quern in Schleswig-Flensburg district
- A locality of Malente in Ostholstein district

=== Thuringia ===
- Neukirchen (Eisenach), in Eisenach, Thuringia
