= Dietrich Heinrich von Bülow =

German soldier and writer

Dietrich Heinrich Freiherr von Bülow (1757–1807) was a Prussian soldier and military writer, and brother of General Count Friedrich Wilhelm Bülow.

== Early career ==
Von Bülow entered the Prussian army in 1773. Routine work proved distasteful to him, and he read with avidity the works of Jean Charles, Chevalier Folard and other theoretical writers on war, and of Rousseau. After sixteen years service he left Prussia, and endeavoured without success to obtain a commission in the Austrian army. He then returned to Prussia, and for some time managed a theatrical company. The failure of this undertaking involved Bülow in heavy losses, and soon afterwards he went to America, where he seems to have been converted to, and to have preached, Swedenborgianism.

On his return to Europe he persuaded his brother to engage in a speculation for exporting glass to the United States, which proved a complete failure. After this for some years he made a precarious living in Berlin by literary work, but his debts accumulated, and it was under great disadvantages that he produced his Geist des Neueren Kriegssystems (Hamburg, 1799) and Der Feldzug 1801 (Berlin, 1801). His hopes of military employment were again disappointed, and his brother, the future field marshal, who had stood by him in all his troubles, finally left him.

== Writing career ==
In 1797, Bülow published his two-volume Der Freistaat von Nordamerika in seinem neuesten Zustand. It offered an decidedly negative account of the United States. John Quincy Adams, then U.S. minister at Berlin, translated the work, describing it as a "libel upon America." Adams' transcription was subsequently published in Joseph Dennie's Philadelphia-based Port Folio in the early 1800s.

After wandering in France and the smaller German states, Bulow reappeared at Berlin in 1804, where he wrote a revised edition of his Geist des Neueren Kriegssystems (Hamburg, 1805), Lehrstze des Neueren Kriegs (Berlin, 1805), Geschichte des Prinzen Heinrich von Preussen (Berlin, 1805), Neue Taktik der Neuern wie sie sein sollte (Leipzig, 1805), and Der Feldzug 1805 (Leipzig, 1806). He also edited, with G. H. von Behrenhorst (1733–1814) and others, Annalen des Krieges (Berlin, 1806). These brilliant but unorthodox works, distinguished by an open contempt of the Prussian system, cosmopolitanism hardly to be distinguished from high treason, and the mordant sarcasm of a disappointed man, brought upon Bülow the enmity of the official classes and of the government. He was arrested as insane, but medical examination proved him sane and he was then lodged as a prisoner in Kolberg, where he was harshly treated, though August von Gneisenau obtained some mitigation of his condition. Thence he passed into Russian hands and died in prison at Riga in 1807, probably as a result of ill-treatment.

== Assessment ==
According to the Encyclopædia Britannica Eleventh Edition:

In Bülow's writings there is a distinct contrast evident between the spirit of his strategical and that of his tactical ideas. As a strategist (he claimed to be the first of strategists) he reduces to mathematical rules the practice of the great generals of the 18th century, ignoring friction, and maneuvering his armies in vacuo. At the same time he professes that his system provides working rules for the armies of his own day, which in point of fact were armed nations, infinitely more affected by friction than the small dynastic and professional armies of the preceding age. Bülow may therefore be considered as anything but a reformer in the domain of strategy. With more justice he has been styled the father of modern tactics. He was the first to recognize that the conditions of swift and decisive war brought about by the French Revolution involved wholly new tactics, and much of his teaching had a profound influence on European warfare of the 19th century.

His early training had shown him merely the pedantic minutiae of Frederick's methods, and, in the absence of any troops capable of illustrating the real linear tactics, he became an enthusiastic supporter of the methods, which (more of necessity than from judgment) the French revolutionary generals had adopted, of fighting in small columns covered by skirmishers. Battles, he maintained, were won by skirmishers. We must organize disorder, he said; indeed, every argument of writers of the modern extended order school is to be found mutatis mutandis in Bülow, whose system acquired great prominence in view of the mechanical improvements in armament. But his tactics, like his strategy, were vitiated by the absence of friction, and their dependence on the realization of an unattainable standard of bravery.
