= Neukirchen, Saxony-Anhalt =

Neukirchen
- Ortsteil of Altmärkische Wische
- Interactive map of Neukirchen
- Location within Germany Location within Saxony-Anhalt
- Coordinates: 52°52′N 11°52′E
- Country: Germany
- State: Saxony-Anhalt
- District: Stendal
- Municipality: Altmärkische Wische

Area
  - Total: 13.76 km^{2} (5.31 sq mi)
- Elevation: 22 m (72 ft)

Population (2006-12-31)
  - Total: 274
  - Density: 19.9/km^{2} (51.6/sq mi)
- Time zone: UTC+01:00 (CET)
  - Summer (DST): UTC+02:00 (CEST)
- Postal codes: 39615
- Dialling codes: 039396
- Vehicle registration: SDL
- Website: www.vgem-seehausen.de

Neukirchen (German pronunciation: [nɔʏˈkɪʁçn̩]) is a village and a former municipality in the district of Stendal, in Saxony-Anhalt, Germany. Since 1 January 2010, it is part of the municipality Altmärkische Wische.
