= Waldbrunn =

Waldbrunn may refer to:

== Geography ==
Hesse

- Waldbrunn, Hesse, in the district of Limburg-Weilburg, Hesse

Baden-Württemberg

- Waldbrunn, Baden-Württemberg, in the Neckar-Odenwald-Kreis, Baden-Württemberg

Bavaria

- Waldbrunn, Bavaria, in the district of Würzburg, Lower Franconia, Bavaria
- a district of Brunnthal, Munich district, Bavaria

== Surname ==
- Ernst Waldbrunn (1907 - 1977), Austrian actor, Kabarettist
- Karl Waldbrunner (1906 - 1980), Austrian politician (SPÖ)
