= Otto Hoegelow =

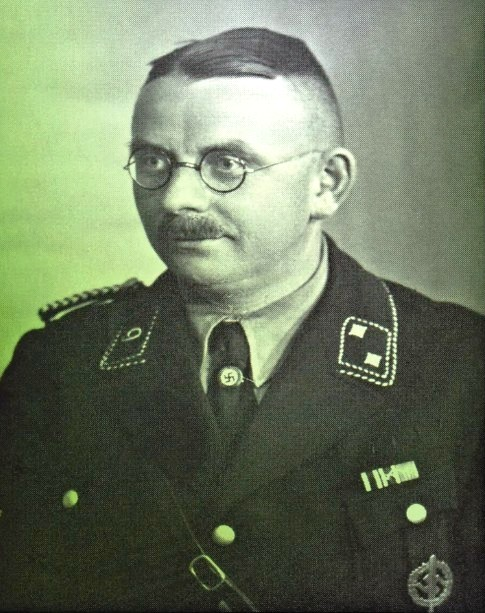
Otto Hoegelow, SS-Oberscharführer, Fort Albert (Alderney), 1943

Otto Hoegelow (born 14 January 1895 in Lentzke/Fehrbellin) was a German SS Hauptscharführer and war criminal.

== Vitae ==
Otto Hoegelow (born 14 January 1895 in Lentzke/Fehrbellin) was a veteran of the I. World War. After the war he married his childhood friend, with whom he had three children. He joined the NSDAP, Nr. 128041 on 17 March 1939 and received the golden NSDAP party badge. He was an Oberscharführer, later Hauptscharführer (from 1938, the second highest rank of the service group of Unterführer with Portepee, also called 'Feldwebel' or 'Spieß') in the Schutzstaffel (SS) of the Waffen-SS. During World War II, he was employed as principal guard in Fort Albert (Alderney) on the island of Alderney, which belongs to the British island of Guernsey.

Hoegelow was one of the SS non-commissioned officers primarily responsible for participating in the brutal shooting and torture of prisoners of war for personal amusement on weekends during the German occupation of the British Channel Islands. For every 10 prisoners killed, he offered a “reward” of 23 days’ leave and three cigarettes.

Alderney, popularly known as “Adolf Island”, was one of, if not the, most heavily fortified and bunkered of the Channel Islands. The approximately 1,000 prisoners of war on the island were held similar to conditions in a concentration camp “Lager Sylt. They came predominantly from the Sachsenhausen Concentration Camp. In 1942, control of Sylt Camp changed. Together with three other labor camps of the Organisation Todt, it was run from March 1943 to June 1944 by the Schutzstaffel – SS Construction Brigade 1. Sylt Camp became a subcamp of the Neuengamme Concentration Camp (near Hamburg). It was the only concentration camp in the territory of the British Crown.

The murders at Fort Albert were the largest murder operations carried out by the Nazis on British soil. In total, around 3,800 Wehrmacht soldiers, about 3,000 forced labourers, and about 1,000 concentration camp prisoners died, the latter under inhumane conditions on the small island of Alderney. According to the Lord Pickle Commission's investigative report, up to 1,000 people (mainly forced labourers from Eastern Europe) died in camps such as the Sylt and Norderney camps.

The concentration camp prisoners were killed by the SS guards due to malnutrition and illness, combined with hard work and the resulting physical weakness; some were tortured and shot out of boredom (see Dayla Alberge (2025); Alderney camps, wikipedia).

== Nazi Era ==
=== Working as an SS sergeant in Fort Alderney ===
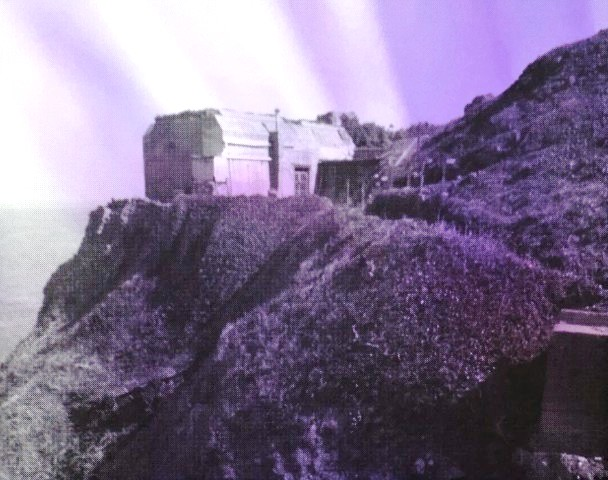
Fort Albert (Alderney). Observation bunker in the south of the island, 1943

When Hitler's troops invaded the island in 1942, no one anticipated how brutal the occupation of this British Crown Land would be. People from Nazi-occupied territories in Europe were shipped to the Channel Islands to establish a "fortress" for the Führer against an Allied attack. The prisoners were treated like slaves. They endured arbitrary shootings, beatings, and starvation, and in some cases, sadistic torture and murder. The smallest of the Guernsey islands, Alderney, was particularly notorious. According to a recent government investigation, this was "systematic terrorism" involving "murder and massacre" and torture. Most of the victims were forced laborers from Russia, brought to the island to build Adolf Hitler's so-called Atlantic Wall, a concrete defence network. Other victims came from 20 countries, including France, Spain, Germany, and Poland.

Intelligence reports after the liberation in 1944 show that bodies disposed of in mass graves were treated like victims from the Bergen-Belsen concentration camp. For example, German guards at the SS concentration camp on Alderney competed, in exchange for drinks and cigarettes, to line prisoners up against a wall of the fort and shoot them. Such firing squads functioned similarly to those at Auschwitz concentration camp for example. The guards selected twelve or fifteen men from among the prisoners. These were tied headfirst to a railway carriage. Then the guards began shooting at them. If they were hit in the head or chest, they usually died instantly. However, some guards deliberately aimed for the arm or leg to prolong the suffering of the victims for hours. This execution site, like the entire fort, can still be visited today. Similar slave labour also took place on Jersey and Guernsey (Balliwick, 2025).

The British government initially concealed the true reasons for these executions, contrary to the instructions of the Moscow Declaration, which made it clear that those responsible for Nazi atrocities should be tried in the country where the crimes were committed (Balliwick, 2025). It also did not prosecute any German officers on the island for war crimes. A recent British government inquiry (Lord Pickles Commission) found that more than 1,100 people died on Alderney, with many more missing. The surviving witnesses, including French Jews deported from Paris by the Vichy government, were forever scarred by their time on the island (Ghosts of Alderney – Hitler's Island Slaves, Wild Dog, 2025).

== Reintegration after the end of the war ==
After the war, Hoegelow was sentenced to a short prison term by a German court in 1949 for other war crimes – like many other Nazi perpetrators on Alderney, such as Kurt Klebeck. His crimes on Alderney were not even taken into account. It was also claimed that the commandant of Alderney, Nazi Major Carl Hoffmann, had been handed over to the Soviet Union and executed there. In 1983, however, the Interior Ministry was forced to admit that Hoffmann was released from captivity in London in 1948 and lived in West Germany until his death in 1974. Klebeck, too, was declared dead. However, he was president of the local football club until his retirement in 1975 and lives with his wife in the Hamburg district of Wandsbek.

The Lord Pickles Commission, chaired by Lord Eric Pickles, investigated the crimes of the Nazi occupation of the island of Alderney during World War II from April 2022 to June 2023 and provided important insights for a more detailed understanding of what happened on the island. Key findings included:

1. Casualty figures: The investigation concluded that between 641 and 1,027 prisoners probably died on Alderney.

2. No 'Mini-Auschwitz': The commission refuted claims that Alderney functioned as a "mini-Auschwitz." While there were gruesome conditions and many deaths, it is not a mass extermination site, as has sometimes been portrayed.

3. Historical justice: The commission also investigated why German war criminals who committed atrocities on Alderney were not prosecuted by Great Britain. It revealed that the case was handed over to the Soviet Union because most of the victims were Soviet citizens. However, the Soviets did not pursue the case further, leading to a lack of prosecution.

4. Conspiracy theories: Another focus of the investigation was to refute conspiracy theories surrounding Alderney. The commission emphasised the importance of a fact-based and accurate account of events on the island.

== Literature ==
- Dayla Alberge (2025): Channel Islands – Nazi guards shot prisoners for fun at Channel Islands camp, research says. ‘’The Guardian’’, 10 Juni 2025
- Bailiwick (2025): Alderney wartime atrocities back in national headlines. ‘’Guernseypress’’, 6 Mai 2024
- Zoe Clough & Robert Hall & Andrew Johnstone (2024): "Ghosts of Alderney - Hitler's Island Slaves", movie Documentary, Wild Dog Limited. 2024
- Caroline Sturdy Collis et al. (2016): "Harry was here 1945": Graffiti and the Nazi Occupation of Alderney, The Alderney Archaelogy and Heritage Project. Tale: The Archaeology Lecture E-library ‘’, YouTube’’, 2016
- Susanne Frömel und Katherine Kay-Mouat (2020): Konzentrationslager: Das KZ im Ärmelkanal. ‘‘Mare‘‘, Nr. 69, 5. August 2008
- Karola Fings (2009): Alderney (Kanalinsel (SS-BB 1). In: Geoffrey P. Megargee (ed.): The United States Holocaust Memorial Museum Encyclopedia of Camps and Ghettos, 1933-1945, chapter: ’’SS-Baubrigaden and SS-Eisenbahnbaubrigaden’’, Indiana University Press, vol. 1, Part B, pp. 1361-1362
- Hartmut Lehmann (2024): „Erinnerungsort Alderney – Spurensuche im Beton“, Vergangenheitsverlag, 168 S.
- Lord Pickles (2024): “Policy paper - Lord Pickles Alderney expert review”. Gov.UK, 22 Mai 2024
- Ralf Sotscheck (1992): "Nazi-Kriegsverbrecher lebt unbehelligt in Hamburg", Die Tageszeitung (taz), 5. Mai 1992
