= Scheidegg =

Scheidegg may refer to:

- Scheidegg, Bavaria, a town in southern Bavaria, Germany
- Scheidegg (Rigi), a mountain summit of the Rigi massif in Schwyz, Switzerland
- The Grosse Scheidegg, a mountain pass between Meiringen and Grindelwald in the canton of Bern, Switzerland
- The Kleine Scheidegg, a mountain pass between Grindelwald and Lauterbrunnen in the canton of Bern, Switzerland
