= Weißenborn =

Weißenborn may refer to the following places in Germany:

- Weißenborn, Saxony-Anhalt, in the Burgenlandkreis, Saxony-Anhalt
- Weißenborn, Hesse, in the Werra-Meißner-Kreis, Hesse
- Weißenborn (Gleichen), part of the municipality Gleichen in the Göttingen district, Lower Saxony
- Weißenborn, Thuringia, in the Saale-Holzland-Kreis, Thuringia
- Weißenborn, Saxony, in the Freiberg district, Saxony
- Weißenborn (Zwickau), a locality of Zwickau, Saxony
- Weißenborn-Lüderode, in the Eichsfeld district, Thuringia
