= Schönbrunn =

Schönbrunn may refer to:

- Schönbrunn Palace in Vienna, Austria
- Schönbrunn Station of the Vienna U-Bahn
- Schönbrunn Zoo in Schönbrunn Palace gardens
- Schönbrunn (Baden), a municipality in Rhein-Neckar, Baden-Württemberg, Germany
- Schönbrunn (Fichtelgebirge), a village in the Fichtelgebirge mountains in Bavaria, Germany
- Schönbrunn im Steigerwald, a municipality in Bamberg, Bavaria, Germany
- Schönbrunn, a district of Floß, Bavaria, Germany
- Schönbrunn, the former German name of the Prussian town Jabłonów, now in Lubusz Voivodeship, in southwestern Poland.
- Schoenbrunn Village, part of New Philadelphia, Ohio
