= Coswig =

Coswig may refer to several places in Germany:

- Coswig, Saxony, in the district of Meißen, Saxony
- Coswig, Saxony-Anhalt, in the district of Wittenberg, Saxony-Anhalt
- Coswig (Verwaltungsgemeinschaft), a "formed community" in the district of Wittenberg, Saxony-Anhalt, Germany
