= Lichtenhagen =

Lichtenhagen, from the oldgerman designation for Clear Grove is the name for many urban places like

- Rostock-Lichtenhagen, borough of Rostock, Germany
- Elmenhorst/Lichtenhagen, Bad Doberan, Germany
- neighborhood of Friedland, Lower Saxony, Germany
- village in Ottenstein, Germany
- neighbourhood of Knüllwald, Schwalm-Eder-Kreis, Germany
- Forest Lichtenhagen, Schermbeck, Germany

Other uses include:

- Silke Lichtenhagen (*1973), German athlete
- Riot of Rostock-Lichtenhagen
