= Kalenborn =

Kalenborn may refer to the following places in Rhineland-Palatinate, Germany:

- Kalenborn, Ahrweiler, in the district of Ahrweiler
- Kalenborn, Cochem-Zell, in the district of Cochem-Zell
- Kalenborn-Scheuern, in the district of Vulkaneifel
