= Neukirch =

Neukirch may refer to:

Australia

- Neukirch, South Australia was a settlement now considered part of Ebenezer in the Barossa Valley

Germany

- Neukirch, Baden-Württemberg, in the Bodensee district
- Neukirch/Lausitz, in the district of Bautzen, Saxony
- Neukirch (bei Königsbrück), in the district of Kamenz, Saxony

Poland

- the former German name of the village of Nowy Kościół, in southwestern Poland

Russia

- the former German name of Timiryazevo, Slavsky District, Kaliningrad Oblast, Russia

Switzerland

- Neukirch an der Thur, a village in the canton of Thurgau

People

- Detlef Neukirch (born 1940), German chess master
- Karl Neukirch, a German gymnast (1864-1941)
- Jürgen Neukirch, German mathematician (1937-1997)
