= Waterloo campaign order of battle =

This is the complete order of battle for the four major battles of the Waterloo campaign.

The order of battle

== French Army order of battle ==
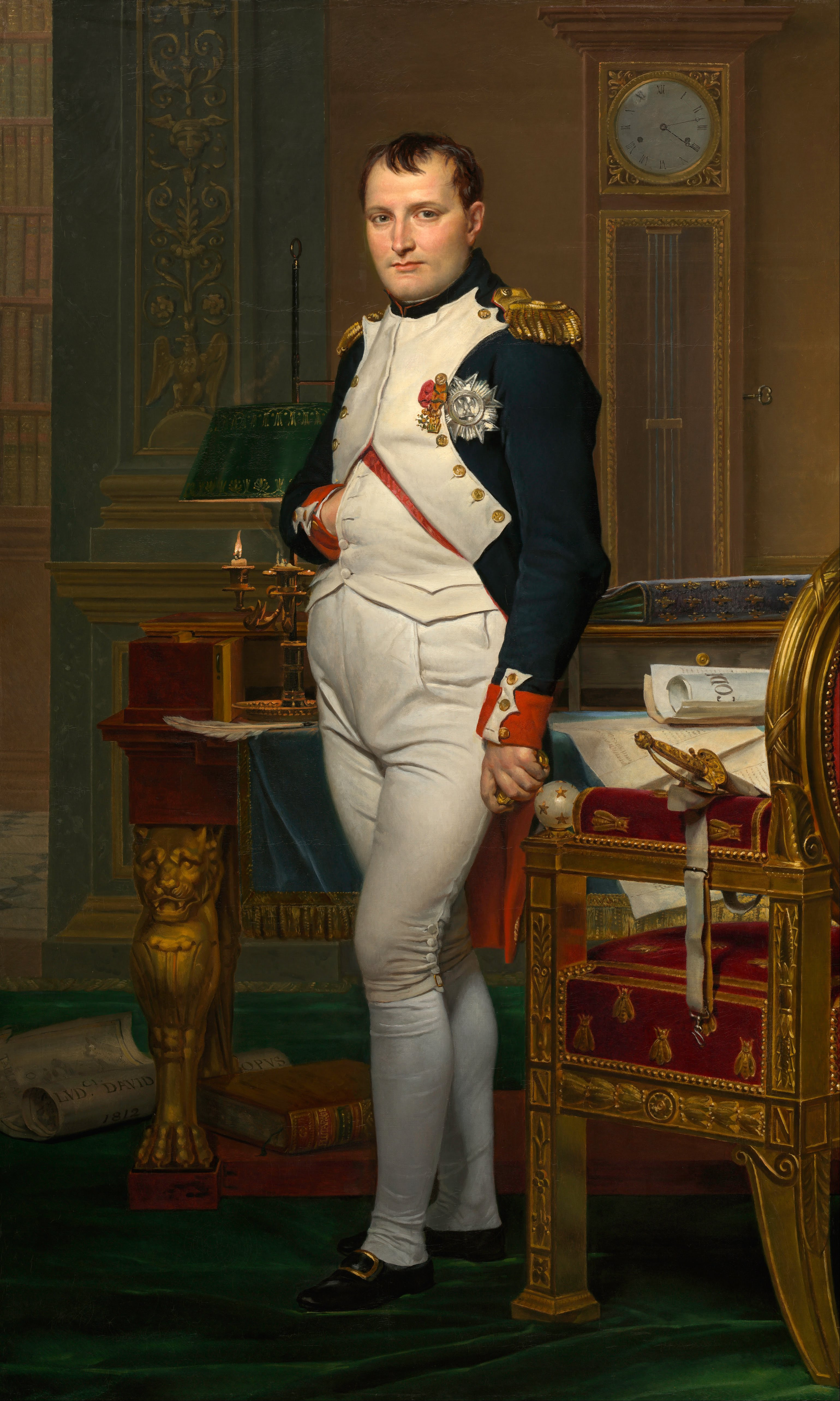
Napoleon I of France

=== Headquarters ===
L'Armée du Nord under the command of Emperor Napoleon I.
Major Général (Chief of Staff): Marshal Soult, Duke of Dalmatia.
Commander of artillery: Général de Division Charles-Étienne-François Ruty.
Field commanders under the direct command of Emperor Napoleon:

- Marshal Ney, Prince of the Moskova:
  - On 16 June 1815, at the battle of Quatre Bras, in command of the Left Wing: I Corps, II Corps (minus the Girard division, present at the battle of Ligny), III Cavalry Corps (minus the l'Héritier division, present at the battle of Ligny) and Imperial Guard light cavalry division.
  - On 18 June 1815, at the battle of Waterloo, effective field commander of all the French forces present, minus those engaged at Plancenoit (VI Corps and elements of the Guard).
- Marshal Marquis de Grouchy:
  - On 16 June 1815, at the Battle of Ligny, in command of the French Cavalry Reserve: I Cavalry Corps, II Cavalry Corps, the l'Héritier division (detached from III Cavalry Corps) and IV Cavalry Corps.
  - Between 17 and 19 June 1815, in command of the Right Wing: III Corps (minus the Domon's cavalry division, present at the battle of Waterloo), IV Corps, I Cavalry Corps (minus the division of Subervie present at the battle of Waterloo, but with the Teste infantry division attached to it), II Cavalry Corps.

=== I Corps ===
Unit	Commander	Complement	Officers	Other Ranks	Losses (Killed, Mortally wounded, Wounded)
I Corps	Général de Division Comte Jean-Baptiste Drouet d'Erlon	19,357 44 guns	825	18,532	
1st Infantry Division	Général de Brigade Baron Joachim Jérôme Quiot du Passage (commanding in the absence of Allix)	4,182	177	4,005	
1st Bde	Colonel Claude Charlet (acting Commander)	2,110	86	2,024	35 officers
I, II / 54^{e} régiment d'infanterie de ligne (RI)	Colonel Claude Charlet	962	41	921	20 officers
I, II / 55^{e} RI	Colonel Jean-Pierre Monneret	1,148	45	1,103	15 officers
2nd Bde	Général de Brigade Baron Charles-Francois Bourgeois	1,881	84	1,797	49 officers
I, II / 28^{e} RI	Colonel Marc-Antoine-Alexandre de Saint-Michel	898	42	856	17 officers
I, II / 105^{e} RI (lost Eagle)	Colonel Jean Genty	983	42	941	32 officers
Division d'Artillerie		191	7	184	
20^{e} Compagnie, 6^{e} d'Artillerie à Pied	Capitaine Hamelin	85 6 × 6 lb guns & 2 × 5.5 in howitzers	4	81	
5/1^{er} Train Squadron		106	3	103	
2nd Division	Général de Division Baron François-Xavier Donzelot	5,315	193	5,122	
1st Bde	Général de Brigade Baron Nicolas Schmitz	2,930	104	2,826	49 officers
I, II, III / 13^{e} Régiment d'Infanterie Légère	Colonel Pierre Gougeon	1,875	61	1,814	28 officers
I, II / 17^{e} RI	Colonel Chevalier Nicolas-Noel Gueurel	1,055	43	1,012	21 officers
2nd Bde	Général de brigade Baron Aulard	2,200	85	2,115	41 officers
I, II / 19^{e} RI	Colonel Jean-Aimable Trupel	1,032	43	989	22 officers
I, II / 51^{er} RI	Colonel Jean-Antoine Rignon	1,168	42	1,126	19 officers
Division d'Artillerie		185	4	181	
10^{e} C^{ie}, 6^{e} d'Artillerie à Pied	Capitaine Cantin	89 6 × 6 lb guns & 2 × 5.5 in howitzers	3	86	
5/1^{er} Train Squadron		96	1	95	
3rd Division	Général de Division Baron Pierre-Louis Binet de Marcognet	4,084	176	3,908	
1st Bde	Général de Brigade Antoine Noguès	1,928	87	1,841	24 officers
I, II / 21^{e} RI	Colonel Jean Nicolas Louis Carré Wounded Colonel Nicholas-Placide Ledoux	1,040	44	996	0. (Note: webpage says that 21st lost their c/o but the record does not show any officer casualties in the 21st at Waterloo, Digby Smith, p.298.)
I, II / 46^{e} RI	Colonel Louis-Andre Dupre	888	43	845	24 officers
2nd Bde	Général de Brigade Baron Jean-George Grenier	1,977	83	1,894	62 officers
I, II / 25^{e} RI	Colonel Jean-Joseph Gromety	974	40	934	31 officers
I, II / 45^{e} RI (lost Eagle)	Colonel Louis-Guillaume-Joseph Chapuzet	1,003	43	960	31 officers
Division d'Artillerie		179	6	173	
19^{e} C^{ie}, 6^{e} d'Artillerie à Pied	Capitaine Emon	85 6 × 6 lb guns & 2 × 5.5 in howitzers	4	81	
2/1^{er} Train Squadron		94	2	92	
4th Division	Général de Division Comte Pierre François Joseph Durutte	4,034	161	3,873	
1st Bde	Général de Brigade Chevalier Jean-Gaudens-Claude Pegot	2,126	77	2,049	30 officers
I, II / 8^{e} RI	Colonel Louis-Gabriel Hypolyte Ruelle	980	37	943	20 officers
I, II / 29^{e} RI	Colonel Etienne-Nicolas Rousselot	1,146	40	1,106	10 officers
2nd Bde	Général de Brigade Jean-Louis Brue	1,731	80	1,651	41 officers
I, II / 85^{e} RI	Colonel Andre Pierre Masson	631	40	591	22 officers
I, II / 95^{e} RI	Colonel Jean-Baptiste Garnier	1,100	40	1,060	19 officers
Division d'Artillerie		177	4	173	
9^{e} C^{ie}, 6^{e} d'Artillerie à Pied	Capitaine Bourgeois I	84 4 × 6 lb guns & 2 × 5.5 in howitzers	3	81	
3/1^{er} Train Squadron		93	1	92	
1st Light Cavalry Division	Général de Division Baron Charles Claude Jacquinot	1,738	114	1,624	
1st Bde	Général de Brigade Baron Adrien-Francois de Bruno	801	54	747	
7^{e} Régiment de Hussards	Colonel Marcellin Marbot	435	24	411	9 officers
3^{e} Régiment de Chasseurs-à-Cheval	Colonel Anatole-Charles-Alexis de la Woestine	365	29	336	11 officers
2nd Bde	Général de Brigade Baron Martin-Alexis Gobrecht	703	50	653	
3^{e} Régiment de Chevaux-légers (Lanciers)	Colonel Charles-Francois Martique	406	27	379	8 officers
4^{e} Régiment de Chevaux-légers (Lanciers)	Colonel Louis Bro	296	22	274	9 officers
2^{e} C^{ie}, 1^{er} d'Artillerie à Cheval	Capitaine Bourgeois II	73 4 × 6 lb guns & 2 × 5.5 in howitzers	3	70	
I Corps Artillerie Reserve	Général de Brigade Jean-Charles De Salles	88	4	84	
11^{e} C^{ie}, 6^{e} d'Artillerie à Pied	Captaine Charlet	87 6 × 12 lb guns & 2 × 5.5 in howitzers	3	84	

=== II Corps ===
Unit	Commander	Complement	Officers	Other Ranks
II Corps	Général de Division Comte Honoré Charles Reille	22,731, 32 guns	852	21,879
5th Division	Général de Division Baron Gilbert Bachelu	4,178	166	4,012
1st Bde	Général de Brigade Baron Pierre-Antoine Husson	2,341	94	2247
I, II / 2^{e} Régiment de Légère	Colonel Pierre-Francois Maigrot	1,944	69	1,875
I, II / 61^{e} RI	Colonel Charles Bouge	830	34	796
2nd Bde	Général de Brigade Baron Toussaint Campi	2,043	91	1,952
I, II / 72^{e} RI	Colonel Frederic-Armand Thibault	970	38	932
I, II, III / 108^{e} RI	Colonel Philippe Higonet	1,073	53	1,020
Division d'Artillerie		191	6	185
18^{e} C^{ie}, 6^{e} d'Artillerie à Pied	Capitaine Deshaulles	90 6 × 6 lb guns & 2 × 5.5 in howitzers	4	86
3/1^{er} Train Squadron		101	2	99
6th Division	Général de Division Prince Jérôme Bonaparte	7,878	237	7,641
1st Bde	Général de Brigade Baron Pierre-Francois Bauduin	4,147	125	4,022
I, II, III / 1^{er} Régiment de Légère	Colonel Amédée Despans-Cubières	1,853	54	1,799
I, II, III, IV / 3^{e} RI	Colonel Hubert Vautrin	943	42	901
2nd Bde	Général de Brigade Baron Jean-Louis Soye	3,531	106	3,425
I, II, III / 1^{er} RI	Colonel Michel Jacquemet	1,766	52	1,714
I, II, III / 2^{e} RI	Colonel Jean Trippe	1,765	54	1,711
Division d'Artillerie		200	6	194
2^{e} C^{ie}, 2^{e} d'Artillerie à Pied	Capitaine Meunier	96 6 × 6 lb guns & 2 × 5.5 in howitzers	4	92
1^{er} Equippage Train Squadron		104	2	102
7th Division	Général de Division Baron Jean Baptiste Girard	3,988	140	3,848
1st Bde	Général de Brigade Vicomte Louis de Villiers	1,480	57	1,423
I, II / 11^{e} Régiment de Légère	Colonel Vicomte Jean Andre Tibruce Sebastiani	923	35	888
I / 82^{e} RI	Colonel Jean Francois de Sales Matis	557	22	535
2nd Bde	Général de Brigade Baron Piat	2,328	78	2,250
I, II, III / 12^{e} Régiment de Légère	Colonel Joseph Mouttet	1,161	43	1,118
I, II / 4^{e} RI	Colonel Jean-Francios Antoine Michel Faullain	1,167	35	1,132
Division d'Artillerie		180	5	175
3^{e} C^{ie}, 2^{e} d'Artillerie à Pied	Capitaine Barbaux	77 6 × 6 lb guns & 2 × 5.5 in howitzers	3	74
1/1^{er} Train Squadron		59	1	58
2/5^{e} Train Squadron		44	1	43
9th Division	Général de Division Comte Maximilien Sebastien Foy	4,845	172	4,673
1st Bde	Général de Brigade Jean-Joseph Gauthier	1,961	69	1,892
I, II / 92^{e} RI	Colonel Jean-Marie Tissot	1,018	35	983
I, II / 93^{e} RI	Chef de Bataillon Massot	943	34	909
2nd Bde	Général de Brigade Baron Jean-Baptiste Jamin	2,697	97	2,600
I, II, III / 4^{e} Régiment de Légère	Colonel Vincent Peyrus	1,093	44	1,049
I, II, III / 100^{e} RI	Colonel Joseph Braun	1,604	53	1,551
Division d'Artillerie		187	6	181
1^{er} C^{ie}, 6^{e} d'Artillerie à Pied	Capitaine Tacon	88 6 × 6 lb guns & 2 × 5.5 in howitzers	4	84
3/1^{er} Train Squadron		99	2	97
2nd Cavalry Division	Général de Division Comte Hippolyte-Marie-Guillaume de Rosnyvinen de Piré	1,840	135	1,705
1st Bde	Général de Brigade Baron Pierre Antoine François Huber	1,046	75	971
1^{er} Régiment de Chasseurs à Cheval	Colonel Pierre-Joseph-Victor Simonneau	485	40	445
6^{e} Régiment de Chasseurs-à-Cheval	Colonel Paul-Eugene de Faudoas-Barbazan	560	34	526
2nd Bde	Général de Brigade Francois-Isidore Wathiez	794	60	734
5^{e} Régiment de Chevaux-légers (Lanciers)	Colonel Vicomte Jean-Francois de Ham Jacqueminot	412	25	387
6^{e} Régiment de Chevaux-légers (Lanciers)	Colonel Baron Nicolas-Marie-Mathurin de Galbois	381	34	347
Division d'Artillerie				
2^{e} C^{ie}, 4^{e} d'Artillerie à Cheval	Capitaine Gronnier	4 × 6 lb guns & 2 × 5.5 in howitzers		
Reserve d'Artillerie	Général de Brigade Le Pelletier			
7^{e} C^{ie}, 4^{e} d'Artillerie à Pied		6 × 12 lb guns & 2 × 5.5 in howitzers		

=== III Corps ===
Unit	Commander	Complement	Officers	Other Ranks
III Corps	Général de Division Dominique Vandamme	16,806, 36 guns	692	16,114
8th Division	Général de Division Baron Etienne-Nicolas Lefol	4,758	175	4,583
1st Bde	Général de Brigade Baron Billiard Killed Colonel Baron Jean-Honore Vernier (Replacement Commander)	2,489	88	2,401
I, II, III / 15^{e} Régiment de Légère	Colonel Jean-Charles Brice	1,701	53	1,648
I, II, III / 23^{e} RI	Colonel Baron Jean-Honore Vernier	1,180	52	1,128
2nd Bde	Général de Brigade Baron Andre-Phillipe Corsin	2,044	83	1,961
I, II, III / 37^{e} RI	Colonel Ferjeux Fortier	1,142	50	1,092
I, II / 64^{e} RI	Colonel Raimond-Martin Dubalen	902	33	869
Division d'Artillerie		225	4	221
7^{e} C^{ie}, 6^{e} d'Artillerie à Pied	Capitaine Chauveau	87 6 × 6 lb guns & 2 × 5.5 in howitzers	4	83
1/1^{er} Train Squadron		12	0	12
II / 2^{e} Régiment du Génie		115	0	115
Ambulance		11	0	11
10th Division	Général de Division Baron Pierre-Joseph Habert	5,856	243	5,613
1st Bde	Général de Brigade Baron Louis-Thomas Gengoult	2,759	112	2,647
I, II, III / 34^{e} RI	Colonel Jean-Antoine-Augustin Mouton	1,439	55	1,384
I, II, III / 88^{e} RI	Colonel Jacques-Louis Baillon	1,320	57	1,263
2nd Bde	Général de Brigade Baron Rene-Joseph Dupeyroux	2,817	121	2,696
I, II, III / 22^{e} RI	Colonel Louis-Florimund Fantin des Odoards	1,456	55	1,401
I, II / 70^{e} RI	Colonel Baron Jean-Pierre Maury	954	45	909
2^{e} Régiment d'Infanterie Etranger (Swiss)	Colonel Augustin-Eugene Staffel	407	21	386
Division d'Artillerie		280	10	270
18^{e} C^{ie}, 2^{e} d'Artillerie à Pied	Capitaine Guerin	93 6 × 6 lb guns & 2 × 5.5 in howitzers	4	89
4/5^{e} Train Squadron		94	2	92
I / 2^{e} Régiment du Génie		85	4	81
Ambulance		8	0	8
11th Division	Général de Division Baron Pierre Berthézène	4,789	173	4,616
1st Bde	Général de Brigade Baron Francois-Bertrand Dufour	2,488	83	2,405
I, II / 12^{e} RI	Colonel Baron Henri-Aloyse-Ignace Beaudinot	1,212	41	1,171
I, II / 56^{e} RI	Colonel Louis-Francois-Joseph Delahaye	1,276	42	1,234
2nd Bde	Général de Brigade Baron Henri-Jacques-Martin Lagarde	2,049	83	1,966
I, II / 33^{e} RI	Colonel Baron Claude-Augustin Maire	1,136	39	1,097
I, II / 86^{e} RI	Colonel Claude-Joseph Pelicier	913	44	869
Division d'Artillerie		252	7	245
17^{e} C^{ie}, 2^{e} d'Artillerie à Pied	Capitaine Guerin	100 6 × 6 lb guns & 2 × 5.5 in howitzers	4	96
5/5^{e} Train Squadron		95	1	94
II / 2^{e} Régiment du Génie		50	2	48
Ambulance		7	0	7
3rd Cavalry Division	Général de Division Baron Jean-Siméon Domon	1,019	87	932
1st Bde	Général de Brigade Baron Jean-Baptiste Dommanget	700	57	643
4^{e} Régiment de Chasseurs à Cheval	Colonel Louis-Alexis Desmichels	337	31	306
9^{e} RCh	Colonel Eugene-Francois d’Avranges Dukermont	362	25	337
2nd Bde	Général de Brigade Baron Gilbert-Julien Vinot	319	30	289
12^{e} RCh	Colonel Alphonse Frederic Emmanuel de Grouchy	318	29	289
Division d'Artillerie		180	6	174
4^{e} C^{ie}, 2^{e} d'Artillerie à Cheval	Capitaine Dumont	77 4 × 6 lb guns & 2 × 5.5 in howitzers	3	74
3/5^{e} Train Squadron		103	3	100
III Corps Artillerie de Réserve	Général de Division Baron Jerome Dougereau	204	8	196
1^{ère} C^{ie}, 2^{e} d'Artillerie à Pied	Capitaine Vollee	100 4 × 6 lb guns & 2 × 5.5 in howitzers	4	96
V / 2^{e} Régiment du Génie		103	3	100

=== IV Corps ===
Unit	Commander	Complement	Officers	Other Ranks
IV Corps	Général de Division Comte Étienne Maurice Gérard	14,874, 30 guns	650	14,222
12th Division	Général de Division Baron Marc-Nicolas-Louis Pécheux	4,765	183	4,582
1st Bde	Général de Brigade Chevalier Jean-Francois Rome	2,337	82	2,255
I, II, III / 30^{e} RI	Colonel Adrien Ramand	1,112	41	1,071
I, II, III / 96^{e} RI	Colonel Jean Gougeon	1,225	41	1,184
2nd Bde	Général de Brigade Baron Christian-Henri Schoeffer	2,328	97	2,231
I, III / 6^{e} Régiment de Légère	Chef de Bataillon Gemeau	1,061	44	1,017
I, II, III / 63^{e} RI	Colonel Jean Laurède	1,267	53	1,214
Division d'Artillerie		100	4	96
2^{e} C^{ie}, 5^{e} d'Artillerie à Pied	Capitaine Fenouillat	100 6 × 6 lb guns & 2 × 5.5 in howitzers	4	96
13th Division	Général de Division Baron Louis Joseph Vichery	4,237	172	4,065
1st Bde	Général de Brigade Baron Jacques le Capitaine	2,029	82	1,947
I, II / 59^{e} RI	Colonel Chevalier Frederic-Alexandre Laurain	1,046	41	1,005
I, II / 76^{e} RI	Colonel Victor-Antoine Morice de la Rue	983	41	942
2nd Bde	Général de Brigade Comte Francois-Alexandre Desprez	1,944	83	1,861
I, II / 48^{e} RI	Colonel Olivier-Antoine-Constantin Peraldi	877	43	834
I, II / 69^{e} RI	Colonel Christophe Hervé	1,067	40	1,027
Division d'Artillerie		264	7	257
1^{er} C^{ie}, 5^{e} d'Artillerie a Pied	Capitaine Saint-Cyr	103 6 × 6 lb guns & 2 × 5.5 in howitzers	4	99
5/5^{er} Train Squadron		84	2	82
V / 2^{e} Régiment du Génie		77	1	76
14th Division	Général de Division Count Louis de Bourmont	4,140	170	3,970
1st Bde	Général de Brigade Baron Etienne Hulot de Mazarny	2,362	90	2,272
I, II / 9^{e} Régiment de Légère	Colonel Paul-Hippolyte-Alexandre Baume	1,278	45	1,233
I, II, III / 111^{e} RI	Colonel Louis-Antoine Sausset	1,084	45	1,039
2nd Bde	Général de Brigade Baron Jean-Francois Toussaint	1,778	80	1,698
I, II / 44^{e} RI	Colonel Jean-Dominique Paolini	983	44	939
I, II / 50^{e} RI	Colonel Francois-Marie-Joseph Lavigne	795	36	759
6th Cavalry Division	Général de Division Baron Antoine Maurin (Note: Antoine Maurin was wounded at the Battle of Ligny, command passed to Louis Vallin (Siborne 1895, p. 299).)	1,537	117	1,420
1st Bde	Général de Brigade Baron Louis Vallin	666	51	615
6^{e} Regiment of Hussards	Colonel Prince Joseph-Marie de Savoy-Carignan	352	25	327
8^{e} Regiment de Chasseurs	Colonel Pierre-Henri-Joseph Schneit	313	25	288
2nd Bde	Général de Brigade Chevalier Pierre-Marie-Auguste Berruyer	712	61	651
6^{e} Regiment de Dragons	Colonel Claude Mugnier	341	30	311
16^{e} Regiment de Dragons	Chef d'Escadron Louis-Charlemagne Fortin	370	30	340
Division d'Artillerie		159	5	154
3^{e} C^{ie}, 3^{e} d'Artillerie a Cheval	Capitaine Tortel	78 4 × 6 lb guns & 2 × 5.5 in howitzers	3	75
2/2^{e} Train Squadron		81	2	79
IV Corps Artillerie de Réserve	General-de-Brigade Basile-Guy-Marie-Victor, Baron Baltus de Pouilly	193	8	185
5^{e} C^{ie}, 5^{e} d'Artillerie a Pied	Capitaine Lenior	98 6 × 6 lb guns & 2 × 5.5 in howitzers	4	94
2^{e} Train des Équipages Militaires		94	3	91

=== VI Corps ===
Unit	Commander	Complement	Officers	Other Ranks
VI Corps	Général de Division Georges Mouton, Count de Lobau	9,295, 32 guns	441	8,854
19th Division	Général de Division Baron François Martin Valentin Simmer	4,247	200	4,047
1st Bde	Général de Brigade Antoine-Alexandre Julienne de Belair	2,148	103	2,045
I, II / 5^{e} RI	Colonel Jean-Isaac Roussille	952	42	910
I, II, III / 11^{e} RI	Colonel Alexandre-Charles-Joseph Aubree	1,196	61	1,135
2nd Bde	Général de Brigade Chevalier Louis-Marie-Joseph Thevenet	1,760	84	1,676
I, II / 27^{e} RI	Colonel Pierre-Etienne-Simon Gaudin	821	39	782
I, II / 84^{e} RI	Colonel Pierre-Andre-Remy Chevalier	939	45	894
Division d'Artillerie		339	13	326
1^{er} C^{ie}, 8^{e} d'Artillerie a Pied	Capitaine Parisot	86 6 × 6 lb guns & 2 × 5.5 in howitzers	3	83
1/7^{e} Train Squadron		56	3	53
4/8^{e} Train Squadron		38	1	37
1^{er} C^{ie}, 1/3^{e} Sapper Battalion		95	4	91
1/1^{e} Military Equippage Squadron		12	0	12
3^{e} C^{ie} de l'Aisne d'equipage auxiliairies		52	2	50
20th Division	Général de Division Baron Jean-Baptiste Jeanin	2,500 men	133	2,367
1st Bde	Général de Brigade Chevalier Jean-Pierre-Francois Bony	1,505	82	1,423
I, II / 5^{e} Régiment de Légère	Colonel Francois-Theodore Curnier de Pilvert	876	42	834
I, II / 10^{e} RI	Colonel Jean-Pierre-Francois-Dieudonne Roussel	629	40	589
2nd Bde	Général de Brigade Comte Jacques-Jean-Marie-Francois Boudin de Tromelin	736	44	692
I, II / 107^{e} RI	Colonel Jean Druot	735	43	692
Division d'Artillerie		259	7	252
2^{e} C^{ie}, 8^{e} d'Artillerie a Pied	Capitaine Paquet	91 6 × 6 lb guns & 2 × 5.5 in howitzers	3	88
1/7^{e} Train Squadron		104	2	102
1/1^{e} Military Equippage Squadron		12	0	12
3^{e} C^{ie} de l'Aisne d'eequipage auxiliairies		52	2	50
21st Division	Général de Division Baron François Antoine Teste	2,548	108	2,440
1st Bde	Général de Brigade Baron Michel-Pascal Lafitte	938	42	896
I, II / 8^{e} Régiment de Légère	Colonel Jean Ricard	938	41	896
2nd Bde	Général de Brigade Baron Raymond-Pierre Penne	981	42	939
I / 65^{e} RI	Chef de Bataillon Boumard	503	22	481
I, II / 75^{e} RI	Colonel Pierre Mathivet	981	42	939
Division d'Artillerie		333	11	322
3^{e} C^{ie}, 8^{e} d'Artillerie a Pied	Capitaine Duverrey	94 6 × 6 lb guns & 2 × 5.5 in howitzers	3	91
4/6^{e} Train Squadron		72	2	70
3^{e} C^{ie}, 1/3^{e} Sapper Battalion		101	9	98
1/3^{e} Military Equippage Squadron		14	1	13
4^{e} C^{ie} de l'Aisne d'eequipage auxiliairies		52	2	50
VI Corps Artillerie de Réserve	Général de Division Baron Henri-Marie Le Noury de la Guignardiere	296	13	283
4^{e} C^{ie}, 8^{e} d'Artillerie a Pied	Capitaine Chaudon	95 6 × 12 lb guns & 2 × 5.5 in howitzers	3	92
2^{e} C^{ie}, 2^{e} Battalion, 3^{e} Régiment du Génie	Général de Brigade Sabatier	200	9	191

=== I Cavalry Reserve Corps ===
Unit	Commander	Complement	Officers	Other Ranks
I Cavalry Corps (light cavalry)	Général de Division Claude Pierre Pajol	2,667, 12 guns	208	2,459
4th Cavalry Division	Général de Division Baron Pierre Benoît Soult	1,267	94	1,173
1st Bde	Général de Brigade Houssin de St Laurent	776	62	714
1^{er} Régiment de Hussards	Colonel Francois-Joseph-Marie Clary	471	34	437
4^{e} RH	Colonel Louis-Joseph Blot	304	27	277
2nd Bde	Général de Brigade Baron Auguste Jean Ameil	418	29	389
5^{e} RH	Colonel Baron Jean-Baptiste Liégeard	417	28	389
Division Artillerie		72	2	70
1^{ere} C^{ie}, 1^{er} d'Artillerie a Cheval	Capitaine Cothereaux	72 4 × 6 lb guns & 2 × 5.5 in howitzers	2	70
5th Cavalry Division	Général de Division Jacques Gervais, baron Subervie	1,399	113	1,286
1st Bde	Général de Brigade Comte Louis-Pierre-Alphonse de Colbert	836	82	754
1^{er} Régiment de Chevaux-légers (Lanciers)	Colonel Jean-Baptiste Dubessy	415	40	375
2^{e} Régiment de Chevaux-légers (Lanciers)	Colonel Jean Baptiste Joseph Sourd	420	41	379
2nd Bde	Général de Brigade Chevalier Antoine Francois Eugene Merlin de Douai	486	28	458
11^{e} Régiment de Chasseurs-à-Cheval	Colonel Baron Nicolas			
Division Artillerie		76	2	74
3^{e} C^{ie}, 1^{er} d'Artillerie à Cheval	Capitaine Duchemin	76 4 × 6 lb guns & 2 × 5.5 in howitzers	2	75

=== II Cavalry Reserve Corps ===
Unit	Commander	Complement	Officers	Other Ranks
II Cavalry Corps (heavy cavalry)	Rémi Joseph Isidore Exelmans	2,849, 12 guns	256	2,593
9th Cavalry Division	Général de Division Baron Jean Baptiste Alexandre Strolz	1,504	127	1,377
1st Bde	Général de Brigade Baron André Burthe	745	56	689
5^{e} Régiment de Dragons	Colonel Jean-Baptiste-Antoine Canevas Saint-Amand	370	24	346
13^{e} RD	Colonel Jean-Baptiste Saviot	374	31	343
2nd Bde	Général de Brigade Baron Henri Catherine Balthazard Vincent	688	66	622
15^{e} RD	Colonel Claude-Louis Chaillot	323	36	287
20^{e} RD	Colonel Armand-Francois-Bon-Claude de Briqueville	364	29	335
Division Artillerie		70	4	66
4^{e} C^{ie}, 1^{er} d'Artillerie à Cheval	Capitaine Godet	70 4 × 6 lb guns & 2 × 5.5 in howitzers	4	66
10th Cavalry Division	Général de Division Baron Louis Pierre Aimé Chastel	1,343	127	1,216
1st Bde	Général de Brigade Baron Pierre Bonnemains	616	59	557
4^{e} RD	Colonel Baron Jean-Baptiste Bouquerot des Essarts	272	21	251
12^{e} RD	Colonel Joachim-Irenee-Francois Bureaux de Pusy	343	37	306
2nd Bde	Général de Brigade Jean-Baptiste Berton	664	65	599
14^{e} RD	Colonel Alphonse-Alexandre Seguier	330	29	301
17^{e} RD	Colonel Louis Labiffe	333	35	298
Division Artillerie	Capitaine Bernard	62 4 × 6 lb guns & 2 × 5.5 in howitzers	2	60

=== III Cavalry Reserve Corps ===
Unit	Commander	Complement	Officers	Other Ranks	Losses (Killed, Mortally wounded, Wounded)
III Cavalry Corps	François Étienne de Kellermann	3,702, 12 guns	274	3,428	114 officers
11th Cavalry Division	Général de Division Samuel-François Lhéritier	1,982	146	1,836	54 officers
1st Bde	Général de Brigade Cyrille Simon Picquet	1,111	85	1,026	
2^{e} RD	Colonel Planzeaux	593	43	550	17 officers
7^{e} RD	Colonel Léopold	517	41	476	17 officers
2nd Bde	Général de Brigade Marie Adrien François Guiton	792	57	735	
8^{e} Régiment de Cuirassiers	Colonel Garavaque	459	32	427	4 officers
11^{e} Régiment de Cuirassiers	Colonel Courtier	332	24	308	16 officers
Division Artillerie		78 4 × 6 lb guns & 2 × 5.5 in howitzers	3	75	
3^{e} C^{ie}, 2^{e} d’Artillerie à Cheval	Capitaine de Marcillac	78 4 × 6 lb guns & 2 × 5.5 in howitzers	3	75	
12th Cavalry Division	Général de Division Nicolas Roussel d'Hurbal	1,719	127	1,592	60 officers
1st Bde	Général de Brigade Amable Guy Blanchard	848	63	785	
1^{er} Régiment de Carabiniers	Colonel Rogé	434	32	402	21 officers
2^{e} Régiment de Carabiniers	Colonel Beugnat	413	30	383	11 officers
2nd Bde	Général de Brigade Frédéric Guillaume de Donop †	792	60	732	
2^{e} Régiment de Cuirassiers	Colonel Baron Grandjean	311	21	290	15 officers
3^{e} Régiment de Cuirassiers	Colonel Jean-Guillaume Lacroix	480	38	442	13 officers
Division Artillerie		78 4 × 6 lb guns & 2 × 5.5 in howitzers	3	75	
2^{e} C^{ie}, 2^{e} d’Artillerie à Cheval	Capitaine Lebau	78 4 × 6 lb guns & 2 × 5.5 in howitzers	3	75	

=== IV Cavalry Reserve Corps ===
Unit	Commander	Complement	Officers	Other Ranks	Losses (Killed, Mortally wounded, Wounded)
IV Cavalry Corps (heavy cavalry)	Général de Division Comte Édouard Jean Baptiste Milhaud	2,982, 12 guns	260	2,722	114 officers
13th Cavalry Division	Général de Division Pierre Watier	1,318	125	1,193	59 officers
1st Bde	Général de Brigade Jacques-Charles Dubois	800	74	726	
1^{er} Régiment de Cuirassiers	Colonel Comte Ordener	485	43	442	17 officers
4^{e} RC	Colonel Habert	314	30	284	14 officers
2nd Bde	Général de Brigade Étienne Jacques Travers	439	47	392	
7^{e} RC	Colonel Richardot	180	22	158	14 officers
12^{e} RC	Colonel Thurot	258	24	234	14 officers
Division Artillerie		78 4 × 6 lb guns & 2 × 5.5 in howitzers	3	75	
5^{e} C^{ie}, 1^{er} d’Artillerie à Cheval	Capitaine Duchet	78 4 × 6 lb guns & 2 × 5.5 in howitzers	3	75	
14th Cavalry Division	Général de Division Jacques-Antoine-Adrien Delort	1,663	134	1,529	55 officers
1st Bde	Général de Brigade Pierre Joseph Farine du Creux	878	72	806	
5^{e} RC	Colonel Baron Gobert	518	39	479	14 officers
10^{e} RC	Colonel Baron Lahuberdière	359	32	327	13 officers
2nd Bde	Général de Brigade Jacques Laurent Louis Augustin Vial	698	57	641	
6^{e} RC	Colonel Martin	285	22	263	16 officers
9^{e} RC	Colonel Bigarne	412	34	378	12 officers
Division Artillerie		78 4 × 6 lb guns & 2 × 5.5 in howitzers	3	75	
4^{e} C^{ie}, 3^{e} d’Artillerie à Cheval	Capitaine Legay	86 4 × 6 lb guns & 2 × 5.5 in howitzers	4	82	

=== French Imperial Guard ===
- Commander of the Garde Impériale: Marshal Édouard Adolphe Casimir Joseph Mortier (on sick leave, following a sudden attack of sciatica).
- Aide-major général (2nd in command): General of Division Comte Antoine Drouot.
- Sous-aide-major général: Colonel Hériot. (Note: The strength and losses of the French Guard foot regiments is provided from a study of the Service Historique de l'Armée de Terre archives, conducted by Russian historian Oleg Sokolov. Complements reflect the actual strength of the Foot Guards on the morning of 16 June 1815, before the beginning of the battle of Ligny. During this battle, around 350 men of the Foot Guard were lost, with most casualties in the Young Guard division (Sokolov 2003, p. 478).) (Note: The complements of the other French Guard units (cavalry, artillery, sappers and sailors) are provided by French historian Alain Pigeard.(Pigeard 2005, pp. 518–520))

Unit	Commander	Complement	Losses (killed, wounded, prisoners, missing)
Grenadier Division	Comte Louis Friant. Deputy: General Roguet.	4,055 (138 officers, 3,917 men)	1,396 (61 officers, 1,335 men), thus 34%
I, II / 1^{er} Régiment de Grenadiers (Old Guard)	Général de Brigade Baron Petit	1,280 (41 officers, 1,239 men)	157 (12 officers, 145 men)
I, II / 2^{e} Régiment de Grenadiers (Old Guard)	Général de Brigade Baron Christiani	1091 (36 officers, 1055 men)	330 (16 officers, 330 men)
I, II / 3^{e} Régiment de Grenadiers (Middle Guard)	Général de Brigade Baron Poret de Morvan	1,164 (34 officers, 1130 men)	673 (16 officers, 657 men)
I / 4^{e} Régiment de Grenadiers (Middle Guard)	Général de Brigade Harlet	520 (27 officers, 493 men)	
Chasseur Division	Général de Division Morand. Deputy: General Michel.	4,603 (132 officers, 4,471 men)	1,775 (58 officers, 1,717 men), thus 39%
I, II / 1^{er} Régiment de Chasseurs (Old Guard)	Général de Brigade Comte Cambronne	1,307 (36 officers, 1,271 men)	330 (7 officers, 323 men)
I, II / 2^{e} Régiment de Chasseurs (Old Guard)	Général de Brigade Baron Pelet-Clozeau	1,163 (32 officers, 1,131 men)	282 (11 officers, 271 men)
I, II / 3^{e} Régiment de Chasseurs (Middle Guard)	Colonel Mallet	1,062 (34 officers, 1,028 men)	25 officers, 1,123 men (3rd and 4th combined)
I, II / 4^{e} Régiment de Chasseurs (Middle Guard)	Général de Brigade Henrion	1,071 (30 officers, 1,041 men)	15 officers, 1,123 men (3rd and 4th combined)
Young Guard	Général de Division Duhesme. Deputy: General Barrois.	4,283 (117 officers, 4,166 men)	1,576 (33 officers, 1,543 men), thus 37%
1st Bde	Général de Brigade Chevalier Chartrand		
I, II / 1^{er} Régiment de Tirailleurs	Colonel Trappier de Malcolm	1,109 (26 officers, 1,083 men)	666 (6 officers, 660 men)
I, II / 1^{er} Régiment de Voltigeurs	Colonel Secrétan	1,219 (31 officers, 1,188 men)	210 (10 officers, 200 men)
2nd Bde	Maréchal de Camp Guye		
I, II / 3^{e} Régiment de Tirailleurs	Colonel Pailhès	988 (18 officers, 960 men)	298 (8 officers, 290 men)
I, II / 3^{e} Régiment de Voltigeurs	Colonel Hurel	967 (32 officers, 935 men)	402 (9 officers, 393 men)
Guard Heavy Cavalry Division	Général de Division Comte Guyot	1,718 men	19 officers
Grenadiers à Cheval	Général de Brigade Jamin, Marquis de Bermuy	796 men	
Dragons de l'Impératrice	Général de Brigade Baron Letort (killed 15 June 1815 at Gilly), then Major Hoffmayer	816 men	
Gendarmerie d'élite	Capitaine Dyonnet	106 men	
Guard Light Cavalry Division	Général de Division Comte Lefebvre-Desnouëttes	2,557 men	30 officers
1st Bde	Général de Division Baron Lallemand		
Chasseurs à cheval de la Garde impériale (French and Mameluke)	Général de Brigade François Antoine Lallemand	1,223 men (26 Mamelukes)	
2nd Bde	Baron de Colbert-Chabanais		
1^{er} Régiment de chevau-légers lanciers de la Garde impériale (French and Polish)	Colonels Schmitt and Jezmanowski	754 men	
2^{e} Régiment de chevau-légers lanciers de la Garde Impériale (Dutch, French and Polish)	Colonel de Colbert	580 men	
Guard Artillery	Général de Division Baron Desvaux de Saint-Maurice	2867 men, 126 artillery pieces	
Old Guard artillery			
Foot Artillery	General de brigade H-D Lallemand	429 men, 9 batteries, 72 pieces	
Horse Artillery	General Jean-Baptiste Duchand	399 men, 4 batteries, 24 pieces	
Artillery train squadron		924 men	
Auxiliary artillery			
Foot Artillery	Dubuard (called Marin)	429 men, 3 batteries, 24 pieces	
Horse Artillery	Laurent	73 men, 1 battery, 6 pieces	
Artillery train squadron		613 men	
Guard Military engineers and Sailors	Général de Division Baron Haxo	519 men	
Sapper Company	Boissonnet	112 men	
Sailor Company	Taillade	107 men	
Equipment train	Gubert	300 men	

== Anglo-allied army order of battle ==
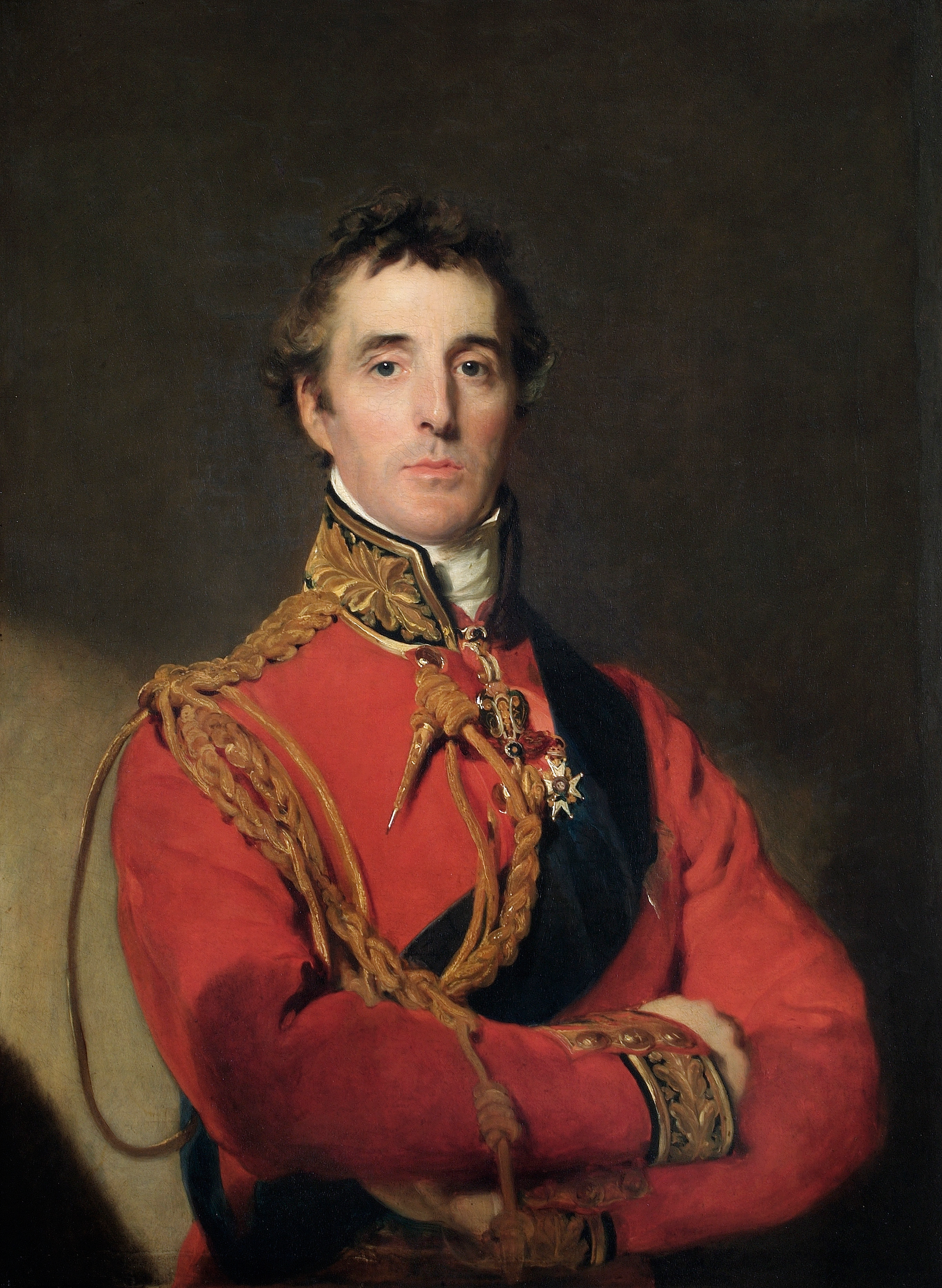
Arthur Wellesley, 1st Duke of Wellington

Combined British, Dutch and Hanoverian forces were under the supreme command of Field Marshal Arthur Wellesley, 1st Duke of Wellington. The order of battle included below reflects all units of the Anglo-allied army including those that were not present for the battles themselves (units spread across the area or on garrison duty). The casualty numbers include all the casualties suffered by each regiment over the three days of fighting during the campaign from 16 June 1815 to dawn on 19 June 1815.

Present at the Battle of Waterloo, Wellington had 71,257 soldiers available, 3,866 officers and 65,919 other ranks. By the end of the day's fighting the army had suffered 16,084 casualties (3,024 killed, 10,222 wounded and 2,838 missing) a loss of 24.6%.

=== Headquarters and support regiments ===
Unit	Commander	Complement	Killed	Wounded	Missing
Headquarters	Field Marshal Arthur Wellesley, 1st Duke of Wellington KG GCB GCH PC FRS	173 officers, 1,889 men	7 officers	30 officers	none
Personal Staff	Colonel Sir William Howe De Lancey KCB	83 officers, 9 men	7 officers	22 officers	none
Medical Staff	Inspector Sir James Grant	39 officers	none	7 officers	none
Artillery Corps	Colonel Sir George Adam Wood CB KCH KMT Kt	15 officers, 10 men	none	none	none
Royal Waggon Train	Lieutenant Colonel Thomas Aird	12 officers, 266 men	none	none	none
Royal Corps of Artillery Drivers	Major Neil Turner	13 officers, 1,212 men	none	none	none
Royal Corps of Engineers & Sappers	Lieutenant Colonel Sir James Carmichael-Smyth, 1st Baronet KCH CB	11 officers, 392 men	none	1 officers	none

=== I Corps ===
I Corps fielded 24,844 (1,233 officers and 23,383 other ranks) on 18 June 1815 taking into account those not present in the Order of Battle and the casualties on the previous two days.

Unit	Commander	Complement	Killed	Wounded	Missing
I Corps	General William, Prince of Orange GCB	1,300 officers, 25,403 men, 52 guns	82 officers, 1,192 men	238 officers, 4,827 men	12 officers, 1,898 men
1st Division	Major-General George Cooke	175 officers, 4,241 men	20 officers, 276 men	38 officers, 1,318 men	0 officers, 5 men
1st Bde	Major-General Peregrine Maitland	78 officers, 1,901 men	11 officers, 276 men	19 officers, 831 men	none
2nd Battalion, 1st Regiment of Foot Guards	Lieutenant Colonel Henry Askew	35 officers, 919 men	4 officers, 78 men	8 officers, 351 men	none
3rd Bn., 1st Regiment of Foot Guards	Lieutenant Colonel William Stuart	40 officers, 982 men	5 officers, 101 men	11 officers, 480 men	none
2nd Bde	Major-General Sir John Byng	79 officers, 1,939 men	7 officers, 93 men	16 officers, 437 men	0 officers, 4 men
2nd Bn., Coldstream Regiment of Foot Guards	Lieutenant-Colonel James Macdonnell	36 officers, 896 men	2 officers, 54 men	7 officers, 242 men	0 officers, 4 men
2nd Bn., 3rd Regiment of Foot Guards	Major Francis Hepburn	40 officers, 1,043 men	4 officers, 39 men	8 officers, 195 men	none
Artillery	Lieutenant-Colonel Stephen Galway Adye	15 officers, 401 men	1 officer, 9 men	2 officers, 50 men	0 officers, 1 man
Sandham's Battery Royal Artillery (RA)	Captain Charles Freeman Sandham	5 officers, 99 men, 5 × 9 lb gun, 1 × 5.5-inch howitzer	0 officers, 7 men	0 officers, 27 men	0 officers, 1 man
Kuhlmann's Battery Horse Artillery, King's German Legion (KGL)	Captain Heinrich Jacob Kuhlmann	8 officers, 302 men, 5 × 9 lb gun, 1 × 5.5-inch howitzer	1 officer, 2 men	2 officers, 23 men	none
3rd Division	Lieutenant-General Count Sir Charles Alten KCB (Count Carl von Alten)	478 officers, 6,995 men	47 officers, 575 men	114 officers, 1,801 men	1 officer, 505 men
5th Bde	Major-General Sir Colin Halkett KCB	173 officers, 2,059 men	27 officers, 208 men	48 officers, 727 men	0 officers, 118 men
II / 30th (Cambridgeshire) Regiment of Foot	Lieutenant Colonel Alexander Hamilton	51 officers, 579 men	5 officers, 51 men	13 officers, 181 men	0 officers, 14 men
33rd (1st Yorkshire West Riding) RF	Lieutenant-Colonel William George Keith Elphinstone	41 officers, 514 men	7 officers, 49 men	15 officers, 162 men	0 officers, 48 men
II / 69th (South Lincolnshire) RF	Lieutenant-Colonel Charles Morice	38 officers, 495 men	4 officers, 51 men	6 officers, 162 men	0 officers, 15 men
II / 73rd RF	Lieutenant-Colonel William George Harris	39 officers, 471 men	9 officers, 57 men	13 officers, 222 men	0 officers, 41 men
2nd Bde, King's German Legion	Brevet Colonel Baron Christian Freiherr von Ompteda	160 officers, 1,522 men	15 officers, 156 men	24 officers, 333 men	0 officers, 132 men
1st (Rifles) Light Battalion	Lieutenant-Colonel Louis von dem Bussche	44 officers, 410 men	3 officers, 37 men	9 officers, 84 men	0 officers, 13 men
2nd (Rifles) Light Bn.	Major Georg Freiherr von Baring	38 officers, 352 men	5 officers, 40 men	9 officers, 120 men	0 officers, 29 men
5th Line Bn.	Lieutenant-Colonel Baron Wilhelm von Linsingen	36 officers, 390 men	2 officers, 36 men	2 officers, 49 men	0 officers, 74 men
8th Line Bn.	Lieutenant Colonel Johann van Schroeder	40 officers, 370 men	3 officers, 43 men	4 officers, 80 men	0 officers, 16 men
1st Hanoverian Bde	Major-General Friedrich von Kielmansegg	127 officers, 3,189 men	4 officers, 196 men	38 officers, 691 men	1 officer, 253 men
Field Bn. Bremen	Lieutenant Colonel Wilhelm von Langrehre	21 officers, 512 men	1 officer, 16 men	5 officers, 126 men	0 officers, 35 men
Field Bn. 1st Duke of York's (Osnabrück)	Major Carl Friedrich von Bülow	25 officers, 607 men	0 officers, 42 men	10 officers, 90 men	0 officers, 49 men
Light Bn. Grubenhagen	Lieutenant Colonel Baron Friedrich von Wurmb	22 officers, 621 men	1 officer, 10 men	5 officers, 146 men	0 officers, 48 men
Light Bn. Lüneburg	Lieutenant Colonel August von Klencke	22 officers, 595 men	2 officers, 40 men	7 officers, 179 men	1 officer, 49 men
Field Bn. Verden	Major Julius von Schkopp	26 officers, 533 men	0 officers, 63 men	8 officers, 94 men	0 officers, 53 men
Field Jaeger Bn. (two Compagnies)	Captain de Reden	10 officers, 321 men	0 officers, 15 men	3 officers, 56 men	0 officers, 19 men
Artillery	Lieutenant Colonel John Suther Williamson	13 officers, 225 men	1 officer, 15 men	1 officer, 50 men	0 officers, 2 men
Lloyd's Battery RA	Major William Lloyd	5 officers, 93 men, 5 × 9 lb gun, 1 × 5.5-inch howitzer	1 officer, 10 men	1 officer, 24 men	0 officers, 1 man
Cleeves' Battery KGLFA King's German Legion	Captain Andreas Cleeves	6 officers, 132 men, 5 × 9 lb gun, 1 × 5.5-inch howitzer	0 officers, 5 men	0 officers, 26 men	0 officers, 1 man
2nd Netherlands Division (2^{e} Divisie)	Luitenant-Generaal Baron Hendrik George de Perponcher Sedlnitsky	290 officers, 7,697 men	14 officers, 286 men	69 officers, 1,409 men	10 officers, 1,024 men
Artillery	Colonel Hendrik Rudolf Trip	5 officers, 233 men	1 officer, 16 men	2 officers, 5 men	0 officers, 11 men
1st Bde (1^{e} Brigade)	Generaal-Majoor Willem Frederik van Bylandt	121 officers, 3,216 men	9 officers, 181 men	30 officers, 824 men	10 officers, 805 men
27th Light Bn. (Bataljon Jagers No. 27)	Luitenant-Kolonel Johann Willem Grunebosch	23 officers, 739 men	1 officer, 17 men	7 officers, 234 men	2 officers, 189 men
7th Line Bn. (Bataljon Infanterie van Linie No. 7)	Luitenant-Kolonel Frederik Charles van den Sande	23 officers, 666 men	3 officers, 24 men	1 officer, 166 men	1 officer, 116 men
5th National Militia Bn. (Bataljon Nationale Militie No. 5)	Luitenant-Kolonel Jan Johannes Westenberg	24 officers, 454 men	4 officers, 83 men	9 officers, 174 men	7 officers, 119 men
7th NMB (Bat. Nat. Mil. No. 7)	Luitenant-Kolonel Hendrick Singendonck	22 officers, 622 men	0 officers, 22 men	6 officers, 70 men	0 officers, 278 men
8th NMB (Bat. Nat. Mil. No. 8)	Luitenant-Kolonel Wijlbrandis Augustus de Jongh	22 officers, 502 men	0 officers, 23 men	5 officers, 130 men	0 officers, 93 men
Foot Artillery Battery (Batterij artillerie te voet)	Kapitein Emmanuel Joseph Stevenart	3 officers, 107 men, 6 × 6-pdr gun, 2 × 24-pdr howitzer	1 officer, 16 men	2 officers, 55 men	0 officers, 11 men
Train (Trein)	Luitenant Frederik Van Gahlen	2 officers, 126 men	none	2 officers, 0 men	none
Horse Artillery Battery (Batterij rijdende artillerie)	Kapitein Adriaan van Bijleveld	5 officers, 100 men, 6 × 6-pdr gun, 2 × 24-pdr howitzer	0 officers, 2 men	5 officers, 46 men	0 officers, 5 men
Train (Trein)	Luitenant Gert van der Hoeven	2 officers, 109 men	1 officer, 12 men	1 officer, 55 men	0 officers, 11 men
2nd Bde (2^{e} Brigade)	Kolonel Friedrich von Goedecke (Note: At the start of the campaign Colonel Goedecke was in command of both the Nassau 2nd Regiment and the Netherlands 2nd Brigade, but on 15 June, the day hostilities commenced, he broke his leg. Major Settler (the senior major and commander of the 1st Battalion) took commanded of the 2nd Regiment, and Prince Bernhard of Saxe-Weimar took command of the 2nd Brigade.)	154 officers, 4,481 men	4 officers, 91 men	3 officers, 484 men	0 officers, 203 men
2nd Nassau Infantry Regiment (2. Infanterieregiment von Nassau)	Majoor Johann Friedrich Sattler	86 officers, 2,585 men	3 officers, 76 men	26 officers, 374 men	0 officers, 109 men
1st Bn. (1^{e} Bataljon)	Kapitein Moritz Büsgen	27 officers, 835 men	1 officer, 26 men	5 officers, 92 men	0 officers, 59 men
2nd Bn. (2^{e} Bataljon)	Majoor Philipp von Normann	25 officers, 819 men	1 officer, 20 men	9 officers, 86 men	0 officers, 38 men
3rd Bn. (3^{e} Bataljon)	Majoor Gottfried Hechmann	27 officers, 819 men	0 officers, 18 men	8 officers, 105 men	0 officers, 3 men
28th Regiment, Orange-Nassau (Regiment Oranje-Nassau No. 28)	Kolonel Bernhard of Saxe-Weimar-Eisenach	57 officers, 1,625 men	1 officer, 10 men	7 officers, 75 men	0 officers, 72 men
1st Bn. (1^{e} Bataljon)	Luitenant-Kolonel Wilhelm Ferdinand von Dressel	28 officers, 835 men	1 officer, 4 men	3 officers, 33 men	0 officers, 20 men
2nd Bn. (2^{e} Bataljon)	Majoor Christian Philipp Schleyer	22 officers, 637 men	none	none	none
Volunteer Jager Company (Compagnie vrijwillige jagers) ('Oranje-Nassau')	Kapitein Emilius Bergmann	5 officers, 153 men	0 officers, 6 men	4 officers, 42 men	0 officers, 52 men
3rd Netherlands Division (3^{e} Divisie)	Luitenant-Generaal Baron David Hendrik Chassé	341 officers, 6,470 men	1 officer, 55 men	15 officers, 299 men	1 officer, 364 men
Artillery	Majoor J.L.D. van der Smissen	11 officers, 299 men	0 officers, 5 men	0 officers, 18 men	0 officers, 12 men
1st Bde (1^{e} Brigade)	Kolonel Hendrik Detmers	167 officers, 2,923 men	1 officer, 26 men	13 officers, 175 men	0 officers, 208 men
35th Light Bn. (Bataljon jagers No. 35)	Luitenant-Kolonel Desire P. J. Arnould	38 officers, 567 men	0 officers, 8 men	3 officers, 60 men	0 officers, 14 men
2nd Line Bn. (Bataljon Infanterie van linie No. 2)	Luitenant-Kolonel Johannes Speelman	26 officers, 445 men	0 officers, 6 men	4 officers, 24 men	0 officers, 57 men
4th National Militia Bn. (Bataljon Nationale Militie No. 4)	Luitenant-Kolonel Ricard Baron van Heeckeren van Molencate	48 officers, 491 men	0 officers, 6 men	0 officers, 27 men	0 officers, 38 men
6th NMB (Bat. Nat. Mil. No. 6)	Luitenant-Kolonel Adolphus van Thielen	24 officers, 468 men	1 officer, 4 men	0 officers, 15 men	0 officers, 19 men
17th NMB (Bat. Nat. Mil. No. 17)	Luitenant-Kolonel Nicolas van Stolz Wieling	25 officers, 509 men	0 officers, 1 man	3 officers, 24 men	0 officers, 30 men
19th NMB (Bat. Nat. Mil. No. 19)	Majoor H. Boelaard	24 officers, 443 men	0 officers, 1 man	3 officers, 25 men	0 officers, 50 men
Horse Artillery Battery (Batterij rijdende artillerie)	Kapitein Carel Frederik Krahmer de Bichin	5 officers, 193 men, 6 × 6-pdr gun, 2 × 24-pdr howitzer	0 officers, 2 men	0 officers, 16 men	none
Train (Trein)	1st Luitenant Zeist	5 officers, 106 men	0 officers, 3 men	0 officers, 2 men	0 officers, 12 men
2nd Bde (2^{e} Brigade)	Generaal-Majoor Alexander d'Aubremé	157 officers, 3,248 men	0 officers, 24 men	2 officers, 106 men	1 officer, 144 men
36th Light Bn. (Bataljon jagers No. 36)	Luitenant-Kolonel Charles Auguste Ernest Goethals	29 officers, 602 men	0 officers, 3 men	0 officers, 10 men	0 officers, 41 men
3rd Line Bn. (Bataljon Infanterie van linie No. 3)	Luitenant-Kolonel E. P. l'Honneux	38 officers, 583 men	0 officers, 1 man	1 officer, 23 men	0 officers, 56 men
12th Line Bn. (Bat. Inf. van linie No. 12)	Luitenant-Kolonel Daniel O. Bagelaar	18 officers, 413 men	0 officers, 2 men	0 officers, 13 men	1 officer, 8 men
13th Line Bn. (Bat. Inf. van linie No. 13)	Luitenant-Kolonel Frederik N. L. Aberson	27 officers, 637 men	0 officers, 6 men	0 officers, 20 men	0 officers, 34 men
3rd NMB (Bataljon Nat. Mil. No. 3)	Luitenant-Kolonel Niels van Malz Wieling	21 officers, 456 men	0 officers, 5 men	0 officers, 26 men	0 officers, 2 men
10th NMB (Bat. Nat. Mil. No. 10)	Luitenant-Kolonel Gebhardt Fanus Brade	22 officers, 557 men	0 officers, 7 men	1 officer, 14 men	0 officers, 3 men
Foot Artillery Battery (Batterij artillerie te voet)	Kapitein Johannes Hendrik Lux	5 officers, 193 men, 6 × 6-pdr gun, 2 × 24-pdr howitzer	0 officers, 2 men	0 officers, 16 men	0 officers, 12 men
Train (Trein)	1st Luitenant Kikkert	2 officers, 122 men	none	none	none

=== II Corps ===
With so much of the Dutch Belgian contingent not present at the battle, only 579 officers and 8,677 men (9,256 in total) were fielded by II Corps.

Unit	Commander	Complement	Killed	Wounded	Missing
II Corps	Lieutenant General Lord Hill GCB GCH	1,417 officers, 24,385 men, 40 guns	21 officers, 245 men	103 officers, 1,179 men	2 officers, 118 men
2nd Division	Lieutenant General Sir Henry Clinton GCB	454 officers, 7,080 men	15 officers, 218 men	91 officers, 1,055 men	2 officers, 118 men
3rd Bde	Major General Frederick Adam	106 officers, 2,617 men	3 officers, 77 men	51 officers, 549 men	0 officers, 30 men
I / 52nd (Oxfordshire) Regiment of Foot (Note: Largest battalion present at Waterloo.)	Lt-Colonel Sir John Colborne KCB	58 officers, 1,061 men	1 officer, 16 men	8 officers, 174 men	none
I / 71st (Glasgow Highland) RF	Lieutenant-Colonel (Brevet Colonel) Thomas Reynell	51 officers, 751 men	2 officers, 24 men	13 officers, 160 men	0 officers, 3 men
II / 95th RF (Rifles)	Major (Brevet Lt Colonel) Amos Godsell Norcott	37 officers, 612 men	0 officers, 34 men	14 officers, 179 men	0 officers, 20 men
III / 95th RF (Rifles), 2 Compagnies	Major (Brevet Lt Colonel) John Ross	10 officers, 193 men	0 officers, 3 men	4 officers, 36 men	0 officers, 7 men
1st Bde, King's German Legion	Lieutenant Colonel Georg Carl August du Plat	162 officers, 1,834 men	8 officers, 70 men	20 officers, 318 men	0 officers, 69 men
1st Line Bn.	Major Friedrich Wilhelm von Robertson	37 officers, 407 men	1 officer, 22 men	7 officers, 69 men	0 officers, 17 men
2nd Line Bn.	Major Georg Muller	40 officers, 482 men	1 officer, 18 men	2 officers, 79 men	0 officers, 7 men
3rd Line Bn.	Lieutenant Colonel Friedrich von Wissell	39 officers, 497 men	1 officer, 17 men	5 officers, 93 men	0 officers, 31 men
4th Line Bn.	Major Friedrich Friedrich Reh	43 officers, 448 men	3 officers, 13 men	5 officers, 77 men	0 officers, 14 men
3rd Hanoverian Bde	Lieutenant Colonel Hugh Baron Halkett	114 officers, 2,339 men	4 officers, 54 men	16 officers, 149 men	2 officers, 16 men
Landwehr Bn. (LB) Bremervörde	Lieutenant-Colonel Friedrich von der Schulenberg	23 officers, 609 men	2 officers, 16 men	3 officers, 17 men	2 officers, 7 men
LB 2nd Duke of York's (Osnabrück)	Major Baron Louis Gudririg von Münster	22 officers, 590 men	2 officers, 17 men	7 officers, 62 men	0 officers, 6 men
LB 3rd Duke of York's (Quackenbrück)	Major Baron Clamor von dem Bussche-Hünefeld	33 officers, 553 men	0 officers, 1 man	1 officer, 10 men	0 officers, 2 men
LB Salzgitter	Major Friedrich von Hammerstein	35 officers, 587 men	0 officers, 20 men	5 officers, 60 men	0 officers, 1 man
Artillery	Lieutenant Colonel Charles Gold	15 officers, 290 men	0 officers, 17 men	7 officers, 39 men	0 officers, 3 men
Bolton's Battery RA	Captain Samuel Bolton	5 officers, 97 men	2 officers, 3 men	2 officers, 10 men	0 officers, 2 men
1st Troop Sympher's Battery KGLHA, King's German Legion	Captain Augustus Sympher	8 officers, 193 men	0 officers, 14 men	4 officers, 33 men	0 officers, 3 men
4th Division	Major General the Honourable Sir Charles Colville GCB GCH	437 officers, 7,383 men	6 officers, 27 men	9 officers, 119 men	none
4th Bde	Lieutenant Colonel Hugh Henry Mitchell CB	121 officers, 1,795 men	6 officers, 27 men	9 officers, 119 men	none
III / 14th (Buckinghamshire) RF	Major Francis Skelly Tidy	38 officers, 586 men	0 officers, 7 men	1 officer, 21 men	0 officers, 0 men
I / 23rd RF (Royal Welch Fusiliers)	Lieutenant-Colonel (Brevet Colonel) Sir Henry Walton Ellis KCB	40 officers, 649 men	6 officers, 11 men	6 officers, 78 men	none
51st (2nd Yorkshire West Riding) RF	Lieutenant-Colonel Hugh Henry Mitchell CB	42 officers, 560 men	0 officers, 9 men	2 officers, 20 men	none
6th Bde Not Present at Battle	Major General George Johnstone	161 officers, 2,450 men			
II / 35th (Sussex) RF	Major Charles MacAlister	33 officers, 535 men			
I / 54th (West Norfolk) RF	Lieutenant-Colonel John James Waldegrave	42 officers, 558 men			
II / 59th (2nd Nottinghamshire) RF	Lieutenant-Colonel Henry Austin	39 officers, 500 men			
II /1st Battalion, 91st (Argyllshire) RF	Lieutenant-Colonel Sir William Douglas KCB	44 officers, 857 men			
6th Hanoverian Bde Not present at the Battle	Major General Sir James Frederick Lyon KCB	140 officers, 2,912 men			
Field Bn. Calenberg	Major Wilhelm Schnehen	29 officers, 605 men			
Field Bn. Lauenburg	Lieutenant-Colonel Gideon von Benoit	31 officers, 522 men			
Landwehr Bn. Bentheim	Major Christian Croupp	24 officers, 584 men			
LB Hoya	Lieutenant-Colonel Otto Freiherr von Grote	29 officers, 600 men			
LB Nienburg	Major Julius Brinckmann	24 officers, 601 men			
Artillery Not present at Battle	Lieutenant Colonel James Hawker	12 officers, 226 men			
Brome's Battery RA	Captain Joseph Brome	5 officers, 90 men			
Rettberg's Hanoverian Foot Artillery	Captain Carl von Rettberg	6 officers, 136 men			
1st Netherlands Division (1^{e} Divisie)	Luitenant-Generaal John Stedman	335 officers, 6,022 men			
1st Bde (1^{e} Brigade)	Generaal-Majoor Ferdinand d'Hauw	174 officers, 3,103 men			
16th Light Bn. (Bataljon Jagers No. 16)	Luitenant-Kolonel Stefan Rudolf van Hulstein	19 officers, 471 men			
4th Line Bn. (Bataljon Infanterie van linie No. 4)	Luitenant-Kolonel Ernst de Man	24 officers, 524 men			
6th Line Bn. (Bat. Inf. van linie No. 6)	Luitenant-Kolonel Pieter Arnold Twent	28 officers, 403 men			
9th National Militia Battalion (Bataljon Nationale Militie No. 9)	Luitenant-Kolonel Johann Jacobus Simons	34 officers, 528 men			
14th NMB (Bat. Nat. Mil. No. 14)	Luitenant-Kolonel Willem Poolman	34 officers, 552 men			
15th NMB (Bat. Nat. Mil. No. 15)	Luitenant-Kolonel Pieter Christiaan Colthoff	34 officers, 625 men			
2nd Bde (2^{e} Brigade)	Generaal-Majoor Dominique Johann de Eerens	160 officers, 2,919 men			
18th Light Bn. (Bataljon Jagers No. 18)	Luitenant-Kolonel Prins August van Arenberg	29 officers, 699 men			
1st Line Bn. (Bataljon Infanterie van linie No. 1)	Luitenant-Kolonel Willem Kuijck	32 officers, 629 men			
1st NMB (Bataljon Nationale Militie No. 1)	Luitenant-Kolonel Frederik Augustus Guicherit	29 officers, 562 men			
2nd NMB (Bat. Nat. Mil No. 2)	Luitenant-Kolonel Albert Willem Senn van Bazel	35 officers, 547 men			
18th NMB (Bat. Nat. Mil No. 18)	Luitenant-Kolonel Frederik Willem van Ommeren	34 officers, 482 men			
Foot Artillery Battery (Batterij artillerie te voet)	Kapitein Pieter Wijnands	5 officers, 114 men, 6 × 6-pdr gun, 2 × 24-pdr howitzer			
Train	1e Luitenant C. Naumann	11 officers, 109 men			
Indies Bde (Indische Brigade: troops for the colonies)	Luitenant-Generaal Baron Carl Heinrich Wilhelm Anthing	183 officers, 3,900 men			
5th East Indian regiment (Oost-Indisch regiment No. 5)	Generaal-Majoor Gerard M. Busman	55 officers, 1,486 men			
...1st Line Bn. (1^{e} Bataljon van linie)	Luitenant-Kolonel B. Bischoff	26 officers, 754 men			
...2nd Line Bn. (2^{e} Bataljon van linie)	Luitenant-Kolonel F. Stöcker	27 officers, 732 men			
10th West Indies Light Bn. (Bataljon West-Indische jagers No. 10)	Kolonel Heinz Willem Charles Rancke	30 officers, 674 men			
11th West Indies Light Bn. (Bataljon West-Indische jagers No. 11)	Luitenant-Kolonel Frederik Knotzer	33 officers, 685 men			
Light Battalion (Bataljon Flankeurs) (Note: 2 flank companies each from 19th and 20th East-Indies Battalion)	Kolonel 2e klasse W. Schenck	29 officers, 507 men			
Foot Artillery Battery (Batterij artillerie te voet)	Kapitein Carl Jan Riesz	5 officers, 175 men, 6 × 6-pdr gun, 2 × 24-pdr howitzer			

=== Cavalry Corps ===
With only three regiments not present at the battle the Cavalry Corps was the most complete at Waterloo fielding 16,133 (933 officers and 13,897 men) after taking into account the small losses at Quatre-Bras and during the retreat on 17 June 1815.

Unit	Commander	Complement	Killed	Wounded	Missing
Anglo-Allied Army Cavalry Corps	Lieutenant General the Earl of Uxbridge GCB	1,015 officers, 15,395 men, 35 guns	68 officers, 925 men	189 officers, 2,206 men	11 officers, 1,003 men
1st (Household) Cavalry Bde	Major-General Lord Edward Somerset KCB	92 officers, 1,121 men	11 officers, 107 men	17 officers, 264 men	2 officers, 245 men
1st Regiment of Life Guards	Major and Lieutenant-Colonel Samuel Ferrior	16 officers, 210 men	2 officers, 24 men	6 officers, 49 men	0 officers, 4 men
2nd Regiment of Life Guards	Lieutenant Colonel Richard Fitzgerald	19 officers, 171 men	1 officer, 16 men	0 officers, 40 men	1 officer, 97 men
Royal Regiment of Horse Guards	Lieutenant-Colonel Sir Robert Chambre Hill	22 officers, 185 men	1 officer, 19 men	6 officers, 61 men	1 officer, 20 men
1st King's Dragoon Guards	Lieutenant Colonel William Fuller	32 officers, 555 men	7 officers, 37 men	4 officers, 100 men	0 officers, 124 men
2nd Union Cavalry Bde	Major General Sir William Ponsonby KCB	82 officers, 1,037 men	14 officers, 254 men	22 officers, 288 men	2 officers, 36 men
1st (Royal) Dragoons	Lieutenant Colonel Arthur Benjamin Clifton	26 officers, 348 men	4 officers, 86 men	10 officers, 88 men	1 officer, 9 men
2nd (Royal North British) Dragoons (Scots Greys)	Lieutenant-Colonel James Inglis Hamilton	29 officers, 339 men	7 officers, 96 men	7 officers, 89 men	0 officers, 0 men
6th (Inniskilling) Dragoons	Lieutenant Colonel Joseph Muter	23 officers, 350 men	1 officer, 72 men	5 officers, 111 men	1 officer, 27 men
3rd British Bde	Major General Sir Wilhelm von Dörnberg	95 officers, 1,313 men	5 officers, 63 men	22 officers, 179 men	1 officer, 46 men
1st Light Dragoons, King's German Legion	Lieutenant-Colonel Johann Bulow	35 officers, 472 men	3 officers, 30 men	11 officers, 99 men	0 officers, 10 men
2nd Light Dragoons, King's German Legion	Lieutenant-Colonel Karl von Jonquieries	30 officers, 452 men	2 officers, 19 men	5 officers, 54 men	0 officers, 3 men
23rd Light Dragoons	Lieutenant-Colonel John Dawson, 2nd Earl of Portarlington	28 officers, 389 men	0 officers, 14 men	5 officers, 26 men	1 officer, 33 men
4th British Bde	Major General Sir John Ormsby Vandeleur	85 officers, 1,220 men	5 officers, 64 men	12 officers, 103 men	0 officers, 25 men
11th Light Dragoons	Lieutenant-Colonel James Wallace Sleigh	28 officers, 419 men	1 officer, 11 men	5 officers, 24 men	0 officers, 25 men
12th (Prince of Wales's) Light Dragoons	Lieutenant-Colonel The Hon. Frederick Ponsonby	26 officers, 373 men	2 officers, 45 men	3 officers, 61 men	0 officers, 0 men
16th (Queen's) Light Dragoons	Lieutenant-Colonel James Hay	28 officers, 428 men	2 officers, 8 men	4 officers, 18 men	none
5th British Bde	Major General Sir Colquhoun Grant KCB	90 officers, 1,354 men	4 officers, 83 men	14 officers, 162 men	2 officers, 20 men
7th (Queen's Own) Light Dragoons (Hussars)	Lieutenant Colonel Sir Edward Kerrison KCB	30 officers, 416 men	1 officer, 62 men	7 officers, 114 men	2 officers, 15 men
15th (King's) Light Dragoons (Hussars)	Lieutenant-Colonel Leighton Cathcart Dalrymple	28 officers, 402 men	3 officers, 21 men	5 officers, 48 men	0 officers, 5 men
2nd Hussars, King's German Legion, replaced by the 13th Light Dragoons in the battle	Lieutenant-Colonel August von Linsingen	28 officers, 536 men			
6th Cavalry Bde	Major General Sir Richard Hussey Vivian KCB	91 officers, 1,372 men	2 officers, 34 men	10 officers, 117 men	0 officers, 43 men
10th (Prince of Wales' Own) Light Dragoons (Hussars)	Lieutenant-Colonel George Quentin	26 officers, 411 men	2 officers, 20 men	6 officers, 40 men	0 officers, 26 men
18th (King's Irish) Light Dragoons (Hussars)	Lieutenant-Colonel Hon. Henry Murray	28 officers, 413 men	0 officers, 13 men	2 officers, 72 men	0 officers, 17 men
1st Hussars, King's German Legion	Lieutenant-Colonel August von Wissell	33 officers, 548 men	0 officers, 1 man	1 officer, 5 men	0 officers, 3 men
7th British Bde	Brevet Colonel Sir Friedrich von Arentsschildt	69 officers, 1,074 men	7 officers, 51 men	16 officers, 147 men	0 officers, 19 men
13th Light Dragoons – attached to the 5th Brigade during the battle	Lieutenant-Colonel Patrick Doherty – acting commander: Lt. Cl. Shapland Boyse	29 officers, 400 men	3 officers, 11 men	8 officers, 69 men	0 officers, 19 men
3rd Hussars, King's German Legion	Lieutenant Colonel Lewis Meyer	39 officers, 674 men	4 officers, 40 men	8 officers, 78 men	none
Attached Artillery	Lieutenant Colonel Sir Augustus Simon Frazer KCB FRS	41 officers, 1,024 men	6 officers, 28 men	21 officers, 180 men	0 officers, 8 men
I (Bull's) Troop, Royal Horse Artillery (RHA)	Major Robert Bull	6 officers, 13 men, 6 × 5 1/2" howitzer	2 officers, 2 men	1 officer, 15 men	0 officers, 2 men
F (Webber-Smith's) Troop, RHA	Lieutenant Colonel James Webber Smith	5 officers, 165 men, 5 × 6-pdr gun, 1 × 5 1/2" howitzer	0 officers, 5 men	0 officers, 18 men	none
E (Gardiner's) Troop, RHA	Lieutenant Colonel Sir Robert Gardiner KCB	6 officers, 168 men, 5 × 6-pdr gun, 1 × 5 1/2" howitzer	0 officers, 2 men	1 officer, 12 men	none
2nd Rocket (Whinyates') Troop, RHA	Captain Edward Charles Whinyates	7 officers, 195 men, 200 Rockets, 5 × 6-pdr gun, 1 × 5 1/2" howizer	0 officers, 3 men	officers, 17 men	none
H (Ramsay's) Troop, RHA	Major William Norman Ramsay	6 officers, 170 men, 5 × 9-pdr gun 1 × 5 1/2" howitzer	1 officer, 2 men	2 officers, 16 men	none
G (Dickson's or Mercer's) Troop, RHA	Captain Alexander Cavalié Mercer	5 officers, 165 men, 5 × 9-pdr gun, 1 × 5 1/2" howitzer	0 officers, 5 men	0 officers, 18 men	none
1st Hanoverian Bde	Colonel Albrecht von Estorff	99 officers, 1,590 men	1 officer, 17 men	0 officers, 33 men	0 officers, 2 men
Prince Regent's Hussars Absent from Battle (Halle)	Lieutenant-Colonel Count Ferdinand Graf von Kielmansegge	32 officers, 569 men			
Bremen and Verden Hussars Absent from Battle (Halle)	Colonel August von dem Bussche	35 officers, 554 men			
Duke of Cumberland's Hussars	Lieutenant-Colonel Georg von Hake	30 officers, 467 men	1 officer, 17 men	0 officers, 33 men	0 officers, 2 men
Netherlands Cavalry Division (Divisie Cavalerie)	Luitenant-Generaal Jean Antoine de Collaert	216 officers, 3418 men	10 officers, 178 men	41 officers, 638 men	4 officers, 503 men
Heavy Cavalry Bde (Brigade Zware Cavalerie)	Generaal-Majoor Albert Dominicus Trip van Zoudtlandt	72 officers, 1,169 men	1 officer, 75 men	15 officers, 159 men	2 officers, 69 men
1st Carabiniers (Regiment karabiniers No. 1)	Luitenant-Kolonel Lambertus Coenegracht	22 officers, 424 men	0 officers, 12 men	9 officers, 66 men	2 officers, 13 men
2nd Carabiniers (Regiment karabiniers No. 2)	Kolonel Jean Baptiste de Bruijn de Basisque	27 officers, 373 men	1 officer, 57 men	4 officers, 64 men	0 officers, 30 men
3rd Carabiniers (Regiment karabiniers No. 3)	Luitenant-Kolonel Christiaan Maria Lechleitner	20 officers, 372 men	0 officers, 6 men	2 officers, 29 men	0 officers, 26 men
1st Light Bde (1e Brigade Lichte Cavalerie)	Generaal-Majoor Baron Charles Étienne de Ghigny	71 officers, 1,014 men	5 officers, 60 men	14 officers, 180 men	1 officer, 173 men
4th Light Dragoons (Regiment lichte dragonders No. 4)	Luitenant-Kolonel Johan Renno	39 officers, 614 men	4 officers, 50 men	8 officers, 135 men	1 officer, 51 men
8th Hussars (Regiment huzaren No. 8)	Luitenant-Kolonel Ignance Louis, Baron Duvivier	27 officers, 400 men	1 officer, 10 men	6 officers, 145 men	0 officers, 122 men
2nd Light Bde (2e Brigade Lichte Cavalerie)	Generaal-Majoor Jean Baptiste, Baron van Merlen	65 officers, 998 men	4 officers, 34 men	11 officers, 180 men	1 officer, 265 men
5th Light Dragoons (Regiment lichte dragonders No. 5)	Luitenant-Kolonel Edouard A. J. G. de Mercx de Corbais	26 officers, 395 men	0 officers, 16 men	9 officers, 97 men	0 officers, 85 men
6th Hussars (Regiment huzaren No. 6)	Luitenant-Kolonel Jonkheer Willem Francois Boreel	36 officers, 603 men	3 officers, 18 men	8 officers, 83 men	1 officer, 168 men
Attached artillery and train					
Horse artillery half battery (halve batterij rijdende artillerie)	Kapitein Abraham Petter	3 officers, 108 men, 3 × 6-pdr gun, & 1 × 24-pdr howitzer	0 officers, 1 man	0 officers,10 men	0 officers, 4 men
Horse artillery half battery (halve batterij rijdende artillerie)	Kapitein Adrianus Rudolf Willem Geij van Pittius	3 × 6-pdr gun, 1 × 24-pdr howitzer	0 officers, 8 men	0 officers, 9 men	0 officers, 4 men
Train (Trein)	2nd Luitenant Camiese	2 officers, 109 men			
Cavalry of the Brunswick Corps	Major Von Cramm	50 officers, 872 men	3 officers, 46 men	9 officers, 95 men	0 officers, 56 men
2nd Hussars Regiment	Major von Cramm	34 officers, 656 men	3 officers, 42 men	7 officers, 72 men	0 officers, 30 men
Uhlans (1 Squadron)	Major Carl Pott	16 officers, 216 men	0 officers, 4 men	2 officers, 23 men	0 officers, 26 men

=== Reserves ===
The reserves, 34,394 men and 56 guns, came under the direct command of Wellington during the Battle of Waterloo. The British 7th Infantry Division under Major General Kenneth MacKenzie was not present at the battle as the brigade manned various garrisons around the area. The Hanoverian Reserve Division was also not present, again manning garrisons on behalf of the army. Actual combatants from the Reserve present at the battle numbered 18,964 with 56 guns.

Unit	Commander	Complement	Killed	Wounded	Missing
5th Division	Lieutenant General Sir Thomas Picton GCB	488 officers, 7,060 men	8 officers, 355 men	191 officers, 2,330	1 officer, 35 men
8th Bde	Major General Sir James Kempt KCB	167 officers, 2,348 men	14 officers, 163 men	87 officers, 1,058 men	1 officer, 1 man
I / 28th (North Gloucestershire) Regiment of Foot	Colonel Sir Charles Paul Belson KCB	39 officers, 580 men	2 officers, 29 men	19 officers, 203 men	none
I / 32nd (Cornwall) RF	Major (Brevet Lieutenant Colonel) John Hicks	44 officers, 605 men	2 officers, 49 men	27 officers, 290 men	none
I / 79th RF (Cameron Highlanders)	Lieutenant-Colonel Neil Douglas	46 officers, 656 men	6 officers, 57 men	25 officers, 390 men	1 officer, 1 man
I / 95th RF (Rifles)	Lieutenant-Colonel (Brevet Colonel) Sir Andrew Frederick Barnard KCB	35 officers, 507 men	3 officers, 28 men	15 officers, 175 men	none
9th Bde	Major General Sir Dennis Pack KCB	177 officers, 2,133 men	21 officers, 143 men	88 officers, 1,035 men	0 officers, 17 men
III / 1st RF (The Royal Scots)	Lieutenant Colonel Colin Campbell	52 officers, 588 men	8 officers, 33 men	25 officers, 295 men	none
I / 42nd (Royal Highland) RF	Lieutenant-Colonel Sir Robert Macara KCB	39 officers, 550 men	3 officers, 47 men	20 officers, 267 men	none
II / 44th (East Essex) RF	Lieutenant-Colonel John Miller Hamerton	36 officers, 427 men	2 officers, 14 men	18 officers, 151 men	0 officers, 17 men
I / 92nd RF (Gordon Highlanders)	Lieutenant-Colonel John Cameron of Fassifern	47 officers, 568 men	6 officers, 49 men	24 officers, 322 men	none
5th Hanoverian Bde	Colonel Ernst von Vincke	125 officers, 2,383 men	1 officer, 33 men	11 officers, 188 men	0 officers, 13 men
Landwehr Battalion Gifhorn	Major Georg von Hammerstein	32 officers, 578 men	1 officer, 13 men	3 officers, 69 men	none
LB Hameln	Major Julius von Strube	34 officers, 635 men	0 officers, 9 men	4 officers, 60 men	0 officers, 7 men
LB Hildesheim	Major Georg von Rheden	34 officers, 583 men	0 officers, 3 men	1 officer, 19 men	none
LB Peine	Major Ludolph Graf von Westphalen	24 officers, 587 men	0 officers, 8 men	3 officers, 40 men	0 officers, 6 men
Artillery	Major Heinrich Heise	12 officers, 191 men	0 officers, 16 men	3 officers, 48 men	0 officers, 4 men
Roger's Battery RA	Captain Thomas Rogers	5 officers, 90 men	0 officers, 4 men	0 officers, 11 men	0 officers, 2 men
Braun's Hanoverian Foot Artillery	Captain Wilhelm Braun	4 officers, 101 men	0 officers, 8 men	0 officers, 27 men	0 officers, 2 men
6th Division	Lieutenant General Sir Lowry Cole	290 officers, 4,895 men	7 officers, 191 men	52 officers, 966 men	0 officers, 92 men
10th Bde	Major General Sir John Lambert KCB	140 officers, 2,249 men	5 officers, 145 men	34 officers, 632 men	0 officers, 18 men
I / 4th (King's Own) RF	Lieutenant Colonel Francis Brooke	36 officers, 532 men	0 officers, 12 men	9 officers, 113 men	none
I / 27th (Inniskilling) RF (Note: Unit with the highest casualty percentage at 82%.)	Major John Hare	22 officers, 562 men	2 officers, 103 men	14 officers, 360 men	0 officers, 18 men
II / 40th (2nd Somersetshire) RF	Major Arthur Rowley Heyland	47 officers, 748 men	3 officers, 30 men	11 officers, 159 men	0 officers, 18 men
II / 81st RF (Loyal Lincoln Volunteers) Absent from Battle	Lieutenant Colonel Henry Milling	32 officers, 407 men			
4th Hanoverian Bde	Colonel Charles Best	132 officers, 2,349 men	4 officers, 60 men	21 officers, 360 men	2 officers, 101 men
Landwehr Battalion Lüneburg	Lieutenant Colonel Ludwig von Ramdohr	24 officers, 582 men	0 officers, 14 men	5 officers, 45 men	0 officers, 4 men
LB Munden	Major Ferdinand von Schmid	37 officers, 590 men	0 officers, 18 men	6 officers, 111 men	0 officers, 30 men
LB Osterode	Major Claus von Reden	35 officers, 621 men	2 officers, 13 men	5 officers, 96 men	0 officers, 14 men
LB Verden	Major Christoff von der Decken	34 officers, 556 men	1 officer, 15 men	5 officers, 108 men	2 officers, 53 men
Artillery	Major Heinrich Bruckmann	9 officers, 202 men	0 officers, 2 men	1 officer, 10 men	none
Unett's Battery RA (absent at Ostend)	Captain George Wilkes Unett	4 officers, 102 men			
Sinclair's Battery RA	Second Captain James Sinclair	4 officers, 100 men	0 officers, 2 men	1 officer, 10 men	none
British Reserve Artillery	Major Percy Drummond	22 officers, 404 men	4 officers, 21 men	5 officers, 36 men	none
A (Ross') Troop RHA	Lieutenant Colonel Sir Hew Dalrymple Ross GCB	6 officers, 153 men, 5 × 9-pdr gun, 1 × 5 1/2" howitzer	0 officers, 2 men	2 officers, 12 men	none
D (Beane's) Troop RHA	Major George Beane	9 officers, 157 men, 5 × 9-pdr gun, 1 × 5 1/2" howitzer	2 officers, 6 men	1 officer, 8 men	none
Detachment Hewitt's Company RA		0 officers, 7 men	0 officers, 2 men	0 officers, 1 man	none
Detachment Tyler's Company RA		0 officers, 5 men	0 officers, 1 man	0 officers, 1 man	none
Detachment Cockburn's Company RA		0 officers, 3 men	0 officers, 1 men	none	none
Detachment May's Company RA		0 officers, 1 man	none	none	none
Hutchesson's Battery RA	Captain Thomas Hutchensson	2 officers, 42 men	1 officer, 0 men	0 officers, 6 men	none
Ibert's Battery RA	Captain Courtnay Ilbert	4 officers, 36 men	1 officer, 9 men	2 officers, 8 men	none
Brunswick Corps	Lieutenant General Duke of Brunswick †	213 officers, 5,686 men, 16 guns	10 officers, 205 men	34 officers, 840 men	0 officers, 218 men
Brunswick Advance Guard	Major von Rauschenplatt	25 officers, 647 men	0 officers, 16 men	5 officers, 63 men	0 officers, 8 men
1st Bde	Lieutenant-Colonel Wilhelm Treunch von Butlar	94 officers, 2,597 men	3 officers, 123 men	21 officers, 383 men	0 officers, 80 men
Guard Bn.	Major Friedrich von Pröstler	25 officers, 647 men	0 officers, 29 men	8 officers, 142 men	0 officers, 21 men
1st Light Infantry Bn.	Major von Holstein	23 officers, 649 men	0 officers, 4 men	3 officers, 44 men	0 officers, 24 men
2nd Light Infantry Bn.	Major Heinrich von Brandenstein	21 officers, 652 men	2 officers, 55 men	5 officers, 122 men	0 officers, 34 men
3rd Light Infantry Bn.	Major von Ebeling	23 officers, 649 men	1 officer, 35 men	5 officers, 75 men	0 officers, 1 man
2nd Bde	Lieutenant-Colonel Friedrich von Specht	77 officers, 1,942 men	4 officers, 64 men	7 officers, 370 men	0 officers, 128 men
1st Line Bn.	Major Metzner	23 officers, 649 men	1 officer, 25 men	2 officers, 132 men	0 officers, 30 men
2nd Line Bn.	Major von Strombeck	27 officers, 646 men	3 officers, 25 men	2 officers, 168 men	0 officers, 46 men
3rd Line Bn.	Major Gustavus von Normann	25 officers, 647 men	0 officers, 14 men	3 officers, 70 men	0 officers, 52 men
Artillery	Major August Mahn	11 officers, 500 men	1 officer, 2 men	0 officers, 24 men	0 officers, 2 men
Heinemann's Horse Battery	Captain Manfred von Heinemann	5 officers, 289 men	1 officer, 2 men	0 officers, 6 men	0 officers, 2 men
Moll's Foot Battery	Major Johann Moll	5 officers, 211 men	none	0 officers, 18 men	none
Hanoverian Reserve Corps Absent – Garrison Duty	Lieutenant-General Friedrich von der Decken	464 officers, 8,974 men			
1st Bde	Lieutenant-Colonel August von Bennigsen	78 officers, 1,929 men			
Field Bn. Hoya	Lieutenant Colonel Ernst von Bothmer	29 officers, 637 men			
Landwehr Bn. Mölln	Major von Donop	23 officers, 641 men			
LB Bremerlehe	Major Arnold von der Decken	24 officers, 651 men			
2nd Bde	Lieutenant-Colonel Karl von Beaulieu	89 officers, 1,938 men			
LB Nordheim	Major Wilhelm Delius	28 officers, 639 men			
LB Ahlefeldt	Major Wilhelm Dammers	31 officers, 699 men			
LB Springe	Captain August Luderitz	29 officers, 598 men			
3rd Bde	Lieutenant-Colonel Karl von Bülow	154 officers, 2,584 men			
LB Otterndorf	Major Georg von Rheden	38 officers, 677 men			
LB Celle	Lieutenant Colonel August von dem Kneseback	39 officers, 599 men			
LB Ratzeburg	Major Christian von Hammerstein	37 officers, 609 men			
LB Lüchow	Captain Henirich Walter	39 officers, 699 men			
4th Bde	Colonel Rudolf Bodecker	139 officers, 2,523 men			
LB Hannover	Major Johann von Weyhe	32 officers, 645 men			
LB Uelzen	Captain Eberhard Kuntze	32 officers, 592 men			
LB Neustadt	Major Friedrich von Hodenberg	35 officers, 645 men			
LB Diepholz	Major Augustus von Bar	39 officers, 641 men			
Nassau 1st Infantry Regiment	Lieutenant General Baron August von Kruse	128 officers, 2,752 men	5 officers, 252 men	19 officers, 370 men	none
1st Bn., 1st Nassau Regiment	Colonel Ernst von Steuben/Major Wilhelm von Weyhers	44 officers, 908 men	1 officer, 98 men	7 officers, 122 men	none
2nd Bn., 1st Nassau Regiment	Major Adolph von Nauendorf	42 officers, 938 men	2 officers, 61 men	6 officers, 124 men	none
3rd Bn., 1st Nassau Regiment	Major Friedrich von Preen	41 officers, 906 men	2 officers, 90 men	6 officers, 124 men	none

== Prussian Army order of battle ==
The Prussian Army was led by Field Marshal Gebhard Leberecht von Blücher, Prince of Wahlstadt and his chief of staff August von Gneisenau and remained independent from the allied Anglo-Dutch-German army during the course of the campaign. His aide de camp was Von Nostitz, who assisted him during the 1815 campaign, notably after his fall at the last charge at the end of the battle of Ligny.

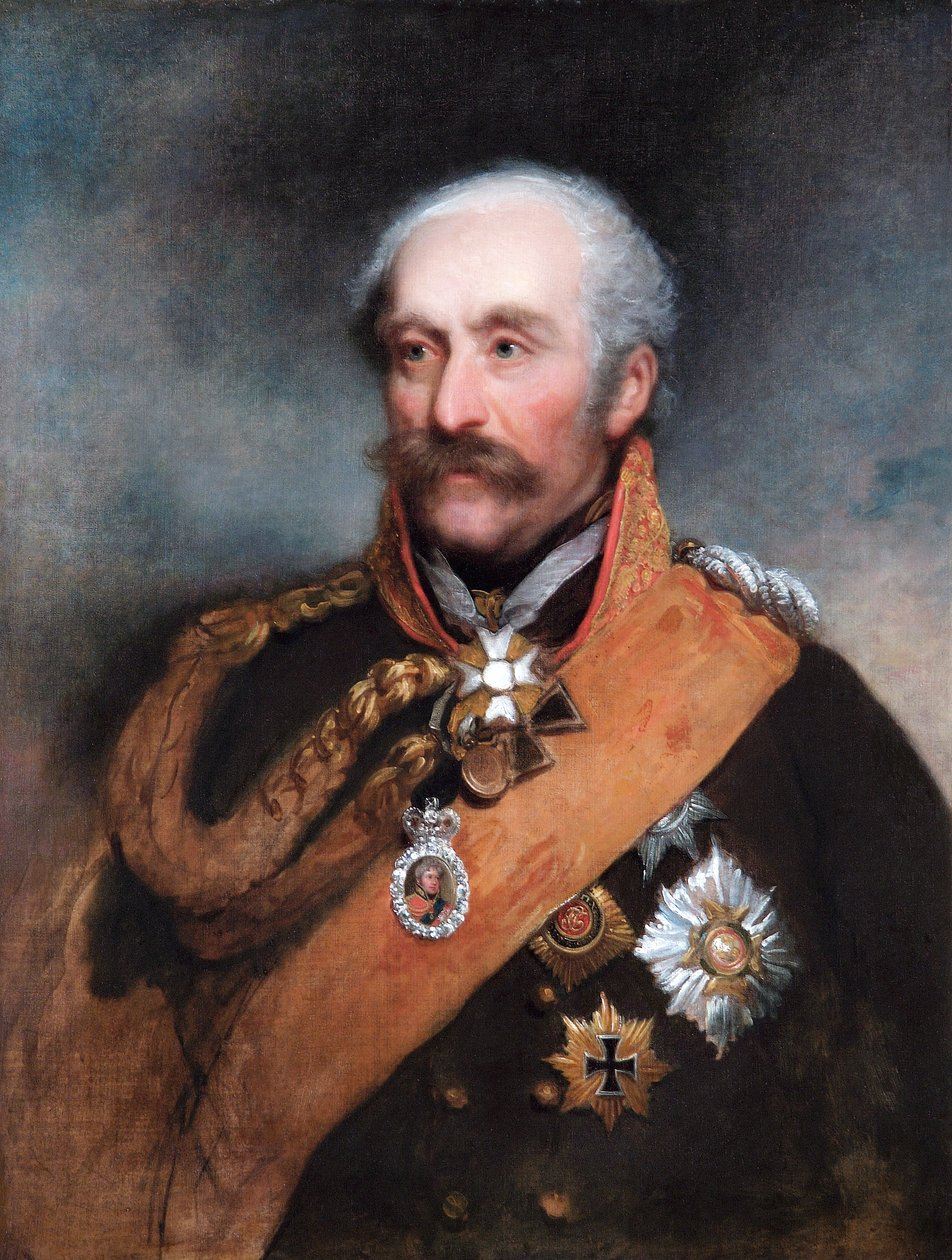
Portrait of Gebhard Leberecht von Blücher (1742-1819), Prussian field marshal

=== Staff ===
Major General Karl von Grolman, was Quartermaster General.

=== I Corps ===
Unit	Commander	Complement	Killed	Wounded
I Corps	Generalleutnant Hans Ernst Graf von Zieten	32,500 men, 96 guns		
1st Brigade	von Steinmetz	9,069 men		
I, II, Fusilier / 12. (2nd Brandenburg) Infanterie Regiment	Oberstleutnant Obergraven			
I, II, F / 24. (4th Brandenburg) IR	Major von Laurens			
I, II, III / 1. (Kleven) Westfalen Landwehr Regiment	Oberstleutnant von Rüchel-Kleist			
2nd Brigade	Pirch II (Note: Georg Dubislav Ludwig von Pirch: "Pirch I", the use of Roman numerals being used in Prussian service to distinguish officers of the same name, in this case from his brother, seven years his junior, Otto Karl Lorenz von Pirch "Pirch II".)	10,568 men		
I, II, F / 6. (1. West Prussian) IR	Colonel von Kemphen	69 officers and 2375 other ranks with 201 Freiwilligen Jäger		
I, II, F / 28. (1. Berg) IR	Major Baron Quadt von Hictenbrock I	72 officers and 2361 others ranks with 200 Freiwilligen Jäger		
I, II, III / 2. (Minden-Ravensberg) Westfalen Landwehr R	Major von Winterfeld	59 officers and 2389 others ranks plus 49 Freiwilligen Jäger		
16. ( 3. Westfalen ) IR	Major Barron Spar	62 officers and 2301 other ranks plus 87 Freiwilligen Jäger		
3rd Brigade	von Jagow	7,146 men		
I, II, F / 7. (2. West Prussian) IR	Oberstleutnant von Seydlitz			
I, II, F / 29. (2. Berg) IR	Major von Hymmen			
I, II, III / 3. (Ostfriesland-Lingen) Westfalen Landwehr R	Major Friccius			
4th Brigade	von Donnersmarck (Note: Donnersmarck is also referred to in some sources as "Henckel" or "Henkel")	7,307 men		
I, II, F / 13. (1. Reserve) IR				
I, II, F / 19. (7. Reserve) IR				
I, II, III / 4. (Münster) Westfalen Landwehr R				
I Corps Cavalry	von Röder			
1st Brigade	von Treskow (Note: An alternative spelling for von Treskow is von Tresckow)	2,280 men		
2. (1. West Prussian) Dragoner Regiment				
4. (1. Schlesiche) Husaren R				
3. Brandenburgisches Uhlanen R				
5. (Brandenburgisches Prinz Wilhelm) Dragoner R				
2nd Brigade	von Lützow	1,632 men		
1. Kurmark Landwehr Kavallerie R				
2. Kurmark Landwehr Kavallerie R				
6. (Lützow) Uhlanen R				
Westfalen Landwehr Kavallerie R				
I Corps Artillery	Lehmann	1,226 men		
3 horse batteries (2nd, 7th and 10th)				
3 × 12-pdr field batteries (only 2nd and 6th Present)				
5 × 6-pdr field batteries (1st, 3rd, 7th, 8th and 15th)				
1 Howitzer battery (1st)				

=== II Corps ===
Unit	Commander	Complement	Killed	Wounded
II Corps	Pirch I	33,000 men, 85 guns		
5th Brigade	Tippelskirch	7,153 men		
I, II, F / 2. (1. Pommern) IR				
I, II, F / 25. (Lützow Freikorps) IR				
I, II, III / 5. (Paderborn) Westfalen Landwehr R				
6th Brigade	von Krafft	6,762 men		
I, II, F / 9. (Kolberg) IR				
I, II, F / 26. (Elbe) IR (Note: In March 1813 during the German Campaign Colonel Reuss created the Ausländer-Bataillon von Reuss ("Von Reuss's Foreign Battalion"). It was originally recruited from ex-POWs (repatriated after the Russian Campaign of the previous year), volunteers and Westphalians. In July 1814 it became the Elbe Regiment, and in March 1815 it was designated as the 26th Prussian line regiment.)	von Reuss			
I, II, III / 1. Elbe Landwehr R	von Bismarck			
7th Brigade	von Brause	6,503 men		
I, II, F / 14. (2. Reserve) IR				
I, II, F / 22. (10. Reserve) IR				
I, II, III / 2. Elbe Landwehr R				
8th Brigade	von Bose	6,584 men		
I, II, F / 21. (9. Reserve) IR				
I, II, F / 23. (11. Reserve) IR	von Langen. (Note: replaced at Ligny by Reckow.)			
I, II, F / 23. (11. Reserve) IR	von Reckow (replaced von Langen at Ligny			
I, II, III / 3. Elbe Landwehr R				
II Corps Cavalry	von Wahlen-Jürgass	4,468 men		
1st Brigade	von Thümen (Note: Colonel von Thümen was killed at Ligny, lieutenant-colonel von Schmiedeberg (commander of the 2nd regiment Silesian uhlans) succeeded to his command.)	1,918 men		
1. (Königin) Dragoner Regiment				
2. (Schlesien) Uhlanen Regiment (Note: Uhlan: A contemporary title used for lancer regiments in the Russian, Prussian, and Austrian armies.)				
6. (Neumark) Dragoner Regiment				
2nd Brigade	von Sohr	1,693 men		
3.(Brandenburgisches) Husaren Regiment				
5. (Pommern) HR				
11. (Berg und Sachsen) HR				
3rd Brigade	von der Schulenburg	1,517 men		
4. (Berlin) Kurmark Landwehr Kavallerie R				
5. Kurmark LKR				
Elbe LKR				
II Corps Artillery	Rohl	1,382 men		
3 horse batteries (5th, 6th and 14th (ex-Lützow))				
2 × 12-pdr batteries (4th and 8th)				
5 × 6-pdr batteries (5th, 10th, 12th, 34th and 37th (ex-Berg))				

=== III Corps ===
Unit	Commander	Complement	Killed	Wounded
III Corps	Generalleutnant Johann von Thielmann	25,000 men, 48 guns		
9th Brigade	von Borcke	7,262 men		
I, II, F / 8. (Leib) IR				
I, II, F / 30. (1. Russisch-Deutsche Legion) IR				
I, II, III / 1. (Berlin) Kurmark Landwehr Regiment				
10th Brigade	Kampfen	4,419 men		
I, II, F / 27. IR				
I, II, III / 2. Kurmark LR				
11th Brigade	von Luck	3,980 men		
I, II, III / 3. Kurmark LR				
I, II, III / 4. Kurmark LR				
12th Brigade	von Stülpnagel	6,614 men		
I, II, F / 31. (2. Russisch-Deutsche Legion) IR				
I, II, III / 5. Kurmark LR				
I, II, III / 6. Kurmark LR				
III Corps Cavalry	von Hobe			
1st Brigade	von der Marwitz	1,432 men		
7. Uhlanen Regiment				
8. (Russisch-Deutsche Legion) Uhlanen R	Count Dohna			
9. Husaren R				
2nd Brigade	Count Lottum	1,992 men		
5. Uhlanen R				
7. Dragoner R				
3. Kurmark Landwehr Kavallerie Regiment				
6. Kurmark LKR				
III Corps Artillery	Mohnhaupt	1,345 men		
3 horse batteries (18th and 19th (ex-russo-German legion), 20th (ex-Berg))				
1 × 12-pdr battery (7th)				
2 × 6-pdr batteries (18th and 35th)				

=== IV Corps ===
Unit	Commander	Complement	Killed	Wounded
IV Corps	General der Infanterie Friedrich Wilhelm Freiherr von Bülow	32,000 men, 132 guns		
13th Brigade	von Hake	6,560 men		
I, II, F / 10. (1. Schlesien) IR				
I, II, III / 2. Neumark Landwehr Regiment				
I, II, III / 3. Neumark Landwehr Regiment				
14th Brigade	Ryssel or Funck	7,138 men		
I, II, F / 11. (2. Schlesien) IR				
I, II, III / 1. Pommern Landwehr Regiment				
I, II, III / 2. Pommern Landwehr Regiment				
15th Brigade	von Losthin	7,143 men		
I, II, F / 18. (6. Reserve) IR				
I, II, III / 3. Schlesien Landwehr Regiment				
I, II, III / 4. Schlesien Landwehr Regiment				
16th Brigade	von Hiller	6,423 men		
I, II, F / 15. (3. Reserve) IR				
I, II, III / 1. Schlesien Landwehr Regiment				
I, II, III / 2. Schlesien Landwehr Regiment				
IV Corps Cavalry	Prince William of Prussia			
1st Brigade	von Schwerin	1,963 men		
1. West Prussian Uhlanen Regiment				
6. (2. Schlesien) Husaren Regiment				
8. Husaren Regiment				
2nd Brigade	von Watzdorff	1,377 men		
10. Husaren Regiment	von Ledebur			
1. Neumark Landwehr Kavallerie Regiment				
2. Neumark Landwehr Kavallerie Regiment				
1. Pommern Landwehr Kavallerie Regiment				
2. Pommern Landwehr Kavallerie Regiment				
3rd Brigade	von Sydow	2,246 men		
1. Schlesien Landwehr Kavallerie Regiment				
2. Schlesien Landwehr Kavallerie Regiment				
3. Schlesien Landwehr Kavallerie Regiment				
IV Corps Artillery	Braun	1,202 men		
3 horse batteries (1st, 11th and 12th (Landwehr))				
3 × 12-pdr batteries (3rd, 5th and 13th)				
5 × 6-pdr batteries (2nd, 11th, 13th (Landwehr), 14th and 21st (Landwehr))				

== See also ==
- Ligny order of battle
- Quatre Bras order of battle
- Military mobilisation during the Hundred Days

== Bibliography ==
- Charras, Jean Baptiste Adolphe (1857), Histoire de la campagne de 1815 (in French), Brussels: Meline, Cans et Comp. & J Hetzel et Comp., p. 352
- Franklin, John; Embleton, Gerry (2015), Waterloo 1815 (2): Ligny, Osprey Publishing, p. 19, ISBN 978-1-4728-0368-9
- Glover, Gareth (2010), Waterloo Archive: German Sources, vol. 2 (illustrated ed.), Frontline Books, pp. 159–160, 233 (footnote 321), 238 (footnote 371), ISBN 9781848325418
- Haythornthwaite, Philip J. (1995) [1870], Journal of the Waterloo Campaign Kept Throughout the Campaign of 1815 by Mercer, Cavalié, Da Capo Press, p. 390, ISBN 0-306-80651-7
- Haythornthwaite, Philip (2007), The Waterloo Armies: Men, Organization and Tactics, Pen and Sword, p. 142, 195, ISBN 978-1-84415-599-6
- Houssaye, Henry (1899), 1815 (27th ed.), Paris: Perrin & C.: Volume 1 and Volume 2.
- Moorsom, W S, ed. (1860), Historical Record of the Fifty-Second Regiment (Oxfordshire Light Infantry) from 1755 to 1858 (2nd ed.), London: Richard Bentley, p. 267 (facsimile printed by The Naval & Military Press Ltd, East Sussex, England)
- NHAE staff (22 October 2010), Allies Order of Battle, Waterloo 1815
- Pigeard, Alain (2005), La Garde Impériale (in French), Paris: Tallandier, Bibliothèque Napoléonienne, ISBN 2-84734-177-3
- Schneider, John (28 April 2012f), L'Armée du Nord (French Order of Battle for the campaign) (in French), archived from the original on 17 July 2012
- Schneider, John (28 April 2012a), The Anglo-Allied Army (Anglo-Allied Order of Battle for the campaign), archived from the original on 17 July 2012
- Schneider, John (28 April 2012p), Das Königliche Preußische Heer des Niederrheins (Prussian Order of Battle for the campaign) (in German), archived from the original on 17 July 2012
- Siborne, William (1844), History of the War in France and Belgium, in 1815 (2nd ed.), London: T. & W. Boone: Volume 1 and Volume 2 (4th and 5th editions published as The Waterloo campaign, 1815). This edition shows "Appendix" in uncut version; (1848): 3rd edition published in one book.
- Siborne, William (1895), The Waterloo Campaign, 1815 (4th ed.), Westminster: A. Constable (1st, 2nd and 3rd editions published as History of the war in France and Belgium in 1815).
- Smith, Digby (2015), Charge! Great Cavalry Charges of the Napoleonic Wars, Barnsley
- Sokolov, Oleg (2003), L'armée de Napoléon (in French), Saint-Germain-en-Laye: Commios, ISBN 2-9518364-1-4
