= Battle of Ligny order of battle =

The following units and commanders fought in the Battle of Ligny 16 June 1815.

== French Army ==
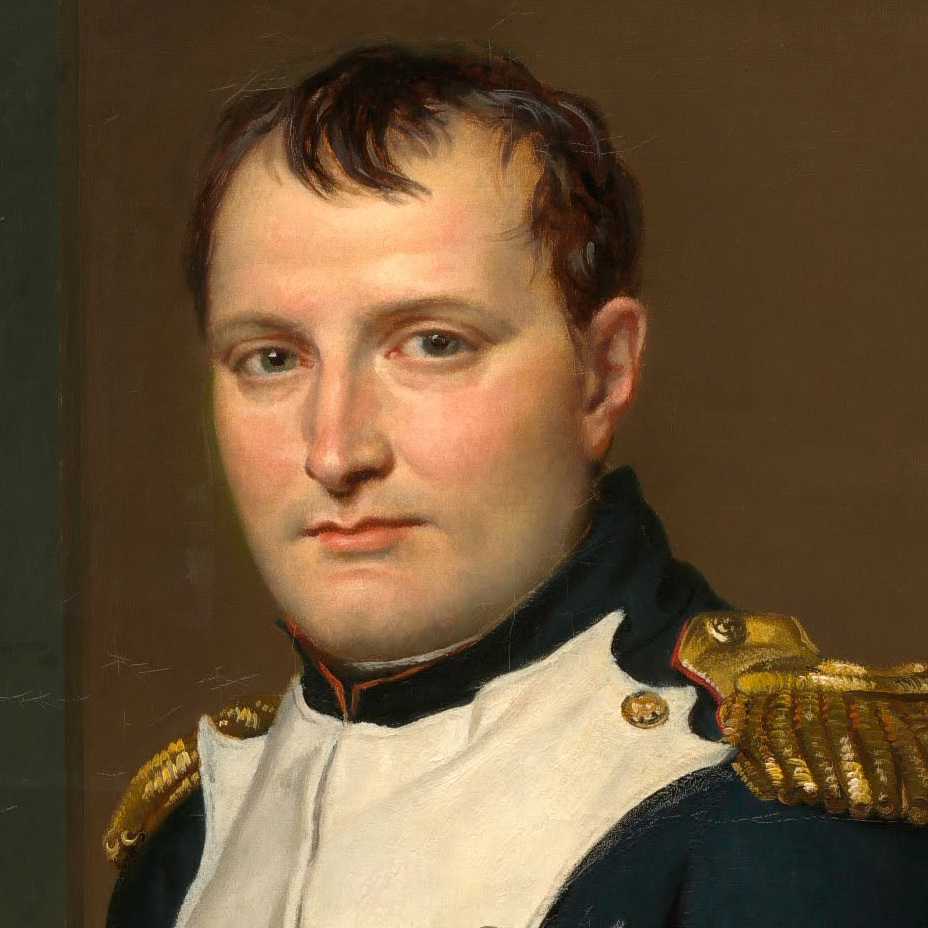
Napoleon Bonaparte

L'Armée du Nord (68,000 men) under the command of Emperor Napoleon I.

Major Général (Chief of staff): Marshal Nicolas Jean de Dieu Soult.

- Imperial Guard: Marshal Mortier (absent); aide-major-général (second-in-command): GD Drouot

Old Guard Division, GD Friant
Middle Guard Division, GD Morand
Young Guard Division, GD Duhesme
Heavy Cavalry Division, GD Guyot

* I Corps: GD Drouet d'Erlon (Corps not engaged)

1st Division, GB Quiot
2nd Division, GD Donzelot

- II Corps: GD Reille (at Quatre Bras, except:)

7th Infantry Division, GD Girard †

- III Corps: GD Vandamme

8th Infantry Division, GD Lefol
10th Infantry Division, GD Habert
11th Infantry Division, GD Berthezène
3rd Cavalry Division, GD Domon

- IV Corps: GD Gérard

12th Infantry Division, GD Pécheux
13th Infantry Division, GD Vichery
14th Infantry Division, GD Hulot
Cavalry reserve, GD Jacquinot

- VI Corps: GD Mouton-Lobau (Corps not engaged)

20th Division, GD Jeanin

- Cavalry reserve: Marshal Grouchy

III Cavalry Corps: GD Kellermann (at Quatre Bras, except:)

11th Division, GD l'Héritier

IV Cavalry Corps: GD Milhaud

14th Cavalry Division, GD Delort

== Prussian Army ==
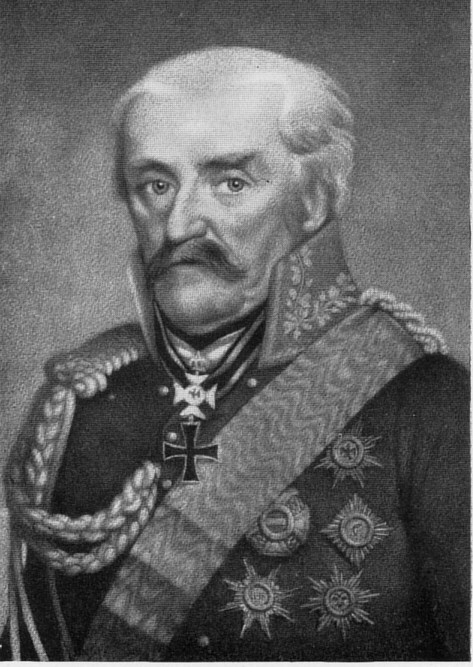
Field Marshal Gebhart Leberecht von Blücher

Prussian Army (84,000 men), under the command of Field Marshal Gebhard Leberecht von Blücher

Lieutenant-General (Chief of staff): August von Gneisenau

- I Corps, commander: Lieutenant-General von Zieten

1st Brigade, Major-General von Steinmetz
2nd Brigade, Major-General Pirch II (Note: Georg Dubislav Ludwig von Pirch: "Pirch I", the use of Roman numerals being used in Prussian service to distinguish officers of the same name, in this case from his brother, two years his junior, Otto Karl Lorenz von Pirch "Pirch II")
3rd Brigade, Major-General Jagow
4th Brigade major, general Henckel von Donnersmarck
Reserve Cavalry, Lieutenant-General von Röder

1st brigade, von Teskow
2nd brigade, von Lützow

Reserve artillery, von Lehmann

- II Corps, commander: Lieutenant-General von Pirch I

5th Brigade, Major-General von Tippelskirch
6th Brigade, Major-General von Krafft
7th Brigade, Major-General von Brause
8th Brigade, Major-General Bose
Reserve Cavalry Major-General of Cavalry, von Wahlen-Jürgass

1st brigade, von Thümen
2nd brigade, von Schulenburg
3rd brigade, von Sohr

Reserve artillery, von Röhl

- III Corps, Lieutenant-General von Thielmann

9th brigade, von Borcke
10th Brigade, von Kämpffen
11th Brigade, von Luck
12th Brigade, von Stülpnagel
Reserve Cavalry Major-General von Hobe

1st brigade, von der Marwitz
2nd brigade, von Lottum

Reserve artillery, von Mohnhaupt

== See also ==
- Quatre Bras order of battle
- Order of Battle of the Waterloo Campaign
