= Domon =

Domon is a surname. Notable people with the surname include:

- Alice Domon (1937–1977), French, Roman Catholic nun
- Jean-Siméon Domon (1774–1830), French general
- Ken Domon (1909 - 1990), Japanese photographer
- Marius Domon (born 2002), French rugby union player

== Fictional characters ==
- Domon Kasshu, main character from the fictional anime and manga series G Gundam
- Bayle Domon, character in American author Robert Jordan's Wheel of Time series
- Naoki Domon (a.k.a. BlueRacer), one of the main heroes in Gekisou Sentai Carranger
- Asuka Domon, a character from Inazuma Eleven
