= August von Kruse =

Baron August von Kruse
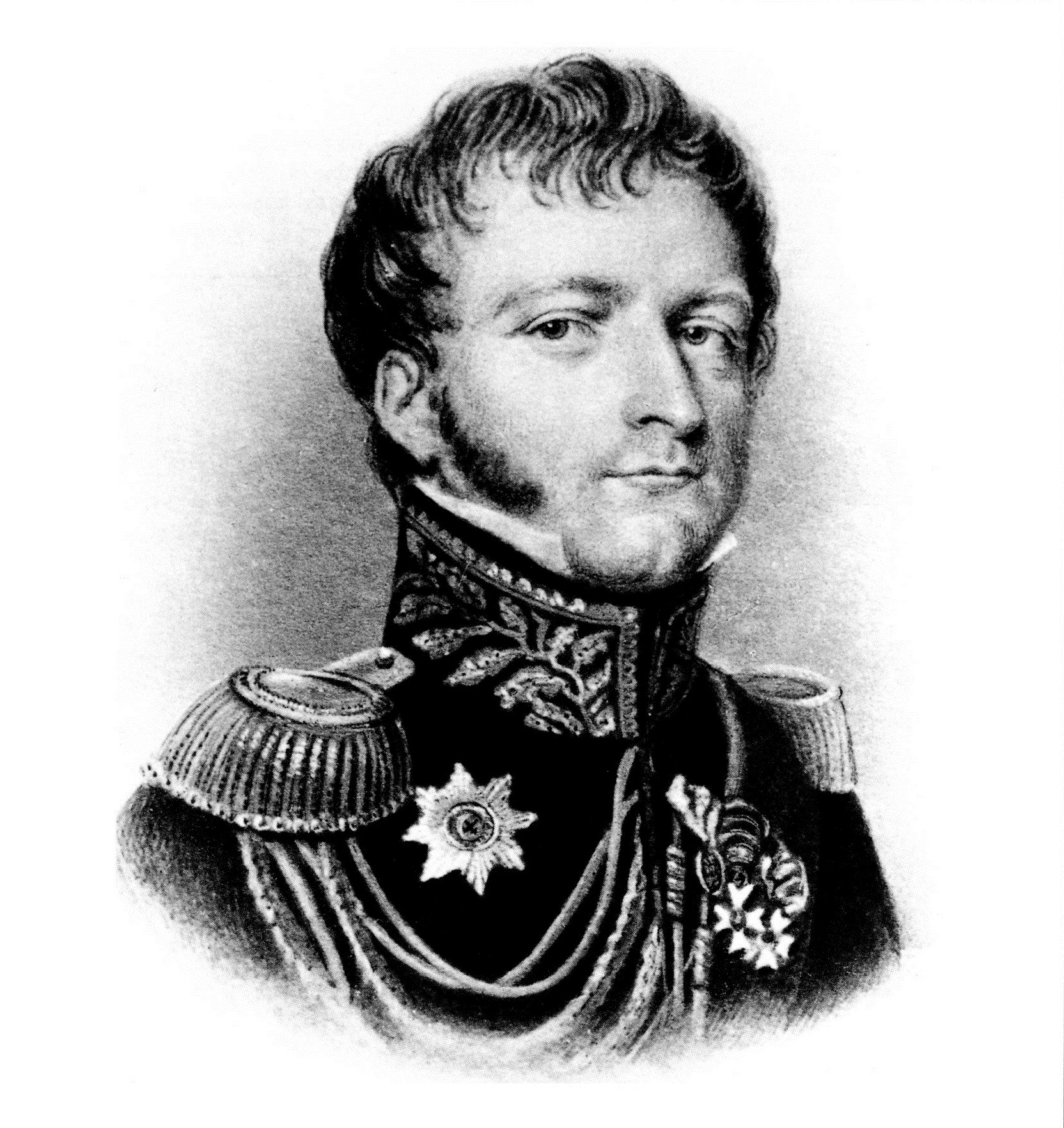
- Born: 1779; Wiesbaden, County of Nassau-Usingen
- Died: January 1848 (aged ~69)
- Military career
- Allegiance: Brunswick-Lüneburg; Nassau-Weilburg; Duchy of Nassau
- Branch: Army
- Service years: 1796-1837
- Rank: First lieutenant (Brunswick-Lüneburg); Lieutenant colonel (Nassau-Weilburg) (Duchy of Nassau) Major-General
- Commands: Nassau Contingent (Anglo-Allied Army); 1st Nassau Infantry Regiment
- Conflicts: Napoleonic Wars; War of the Fourth Coalition; Peninsular War; Battle of Vitoria; Hundred Days; Battle of Waterloo
- Awards: Waterloo Medal; Grand Cross with Diamonds of the Order of Saint Anna; Grand Cross of the Royal Guelphic Order; Officer of the Legion of Honour; Knight of the Military Order of William
- Other work: Experimental farmer

Major-General August von Kruse (1779 – January 1848), was an officer in the army of the Duchy of Nassau during the Napoleonic Wars, and an experimental farmer in his retirement.

von Kruse organized the military of the state of Nassau during the Napoleonic Wars, and participated in the lengthy French campaign in the Iberian Peninsula; under secret orders from his Duke he switched sides in 1814, and fought against the French in northern Europe. He commanded the Nassau infantry brigade at the Battle of Waterloo.

In his retirement, he experimented in new farming and cattle breeding techniques on a small acreage given to him by the Duke of Nassau, exploring the problems in raising healthy cattle.

== Family and military career ==
August von Kruse was born in Wiesbaden in 1779. His father, Karl Friedrich von Kruse (1737–1806), a state official in the service of Nassau-Usingen, wrote several books on husbandry and household management, including Lehrbegriffs der Landwirtschaft und Haushaltungskunste for the Naussau schools in 1780, and Wahren Darstellung der grossen französichen Staatsrevolutions in 1790, which entered into several printings. His mother was Philippina Catherina von Bitburg; he was their only son.

Against the wishes of his father, he decided to join the military at age 17. For seven years he served in the military of Brunswick-Lüneburg, departing as an officer. On 1 July 1803 he accepted a commission as a captain in the Nassau-Weilburg army, which at the time consisted of only two companies. With the merger of the Principality of Nassau-Weilburg and County of Nassau-Usingen the army expanded considerably, and Kruse received the rank of major. As a client state of France, Nassau supported Napoleon in the Prussian campaign of 1806. By the end of the campaign, Kruse had been promoted to lieutenant colonel.

In the summer of 1808, Kruse commanded the 2nd Nassau Infantry Regiment No. 88, and fought for the French in the Peninsular War. On 13 October 1808, the regiment crossed the Spanish border. The Nasssauers participated in 42 battles, including the Battle of Vitoria on 21 June 1813. On 10 December 1813, as Napoleon's empire crumbled in northern Europe, Kruse received secret orders from the Duke and the Prince of Orange to join the British. He carefully maneuvered his men so they could march to the British line, upon which he announced their change of allegiance.

== Nassauers ==
Commanded by General von Kruse:

- 1st Battalion, 1st Line Infantry
- 2nd Battalion, 1st Line Infantry
- 3rd Battalion, 1st Line Infantry

Kruse's Nassauers, the 1st Nassau Infantry Regiment, were actually on the ridge in Wellington's left center at Waterloo, not at Hougoumont, as is sometimes reported; Wellington apparently was familiar enough with Kruse's actions in the Peninsula to comment to him prior to the battle: "I hope, General, that your actions today are as clever when you are fighting for me as they were in Spain when you were fighting against me." A small Dutch light infantry battalion was in the woods of Hougoumont throughout the daylong fight there. The 2nd Nassau Infantry Regiment, under Prince Bernard of Saxe Weimar, was on the Allied far left at Waterloo.

== Awards ==
von Kruse's decorations included the Grand Cross with Diamonds of the Imperial Russian Order of St. Anne, the Legion of Honour, Nassau's Waterloo Medal, the insignia of a Knight of the Royal Netherlands Military Willems-Order, and the Grand Cross of the Royal Guelphic Order.

As a reward for his service he was given a farm in 1822 by the Duke, near Eisenbach in the Taunus mountain range. On this 58 hectares (143 acres) farm, he experimented with new methods of construction and cattle breeding, and published his findings, which formed the basis of new practices in farm management. He also experimented in the development of social networks to alleviate widespread suffering, such as alcohol abuse. Kruse married Baroness Henriette von Dungern, who died in 1873, and they are both buried on the farm.
