= Samuel Ferrior =

British soldier

Samuel Ferrior (1772 – 18 June 1815) was a British soldier killed at the Battle of Waterloo on 18 June 1815.

== Career ==
Born in Pembrokeshire, he was promoted to captain in the 1st Life Guards on 1 August 1802. On 30 June 1810 he was promoted from captain to major by purchase and subsequently to lieutenant-colonel.

At the Battle of Waterloo, the 1st Life Guards formed part of the 1st (or household) brigade of heavy cavalry under Major-General Lord Edward Somerset.

Records suggest that during the battle, as major and Lieutenant-colonel he led his regiment in eleven charges, most of which were not made until after "his head had been laid open by the cut of a sabre and his body was pierced with a lance".
