= Louis Vallin =

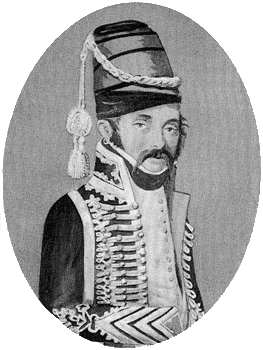
Louis Vallin

Louis Vallin (French pronunciation: [lwi valɛ̃]; 16 August 1770 in Dormans – 25 December 1854 in Paris) was a French general. He became colonel of the 6th Hussars in 1807 and a general in 1812. He fought for the Royalists during the French intervention in Spain. He was rewarded for his service with appointment as a commander of the Order of Saint Louis, a grand officier of the Legion of Honor and a baron of the First French Empire. His name is one of those of notable French commanders inscribed on the Arc de Triomphe in Paris.
