= John Hicks (British Army officer) =

British Army officer (c. 1780–1838)

John Hicks C.B. K.St.A. GC
- Born: c. 1780; Cornwall, England
- Died: 18 May 1838 (aged 57–58)
- Military career
- Allegiance: United Kingdom
- Branch: British Army
- Service years: 1808–1826
- Rank: Colonel
- Unit: 32nd (Cornwall) Regiment of Foot
- Commands: 1st Battalion, 32nd Foot
- Conflicts: Peninsular War; Battle of Salamanca; Battle of Vittoria; Battle of Nivelle; Battle of Toulouse; Waterloo Campaign; Battle of Quatre Bras; Battle of Waterloo
- Awards: Companion of the Order of the Bath (C.B.); Knight of the Imperial Order of St. Anne (K.St.A.); Gold Cross (Peninsular War)

Colonel John Hicks was a British Army officer who fought during the Napoleonic Wars. He commanded the 32nd Regiment of Foot.

== Peninsular War ==
Hicks was commissioned as an ensign in the Felbrigg Volunteer Infantry in 1803. He was transferred to Royal Cornwall Militia in 1804, by August 1804 he also served in the Royal Cornwall Regiment, promoted to a captain in 1808. In the August 1808 Hicks had fought Battle of Rolica,Vimerio. 1809, Under Sir John Moore he participated in the Corunna Campaign and Walcheren Expedition. As serving three years, Hicks was promoted to a major in 1811. He fought battle of Salamanca, Vittoria, Nivelle, Toulouse. By September 1814, Hicks was promoted to a lieutenant-colonel of 1st Battalion of 32nd Foot.

== Hundred Days ==
Hicks commanded 647 men of all ranks. He arrived at Quatre Bras at 2pm under Picton's division and helped to halt the French charges. At Waterloo the 32nd were stationed opposite the French main attacks, stoically standing their ground before attacking Napoleon’s assaulting troops. There were 647 men at the start of 16 June 1815, and at the end of the 2 days there were only 131 men left standing. He was promoted to a colonel on 18 May 1826. Quitted the service 1828. Died on18th May 1838.

== Recognition ==
Gold Cross- For Pa Veterans for participating in more than four battles.

Companion of the Order of the Bath- Received for his command of the 32nd Regiment at Waterloo.

Knight of the Order of St. Anne (K.St.A.)- Allied officers who distinguished themselves at Waterloo. Conferred by Tsar Alexander I to British officers who played key roles in Napoleon’s defeat.
