= Leighton Cathcart Dalrymple =

British army officer

Leighton Cathcart Dalrymple C.B.
- Born: 1785; England
- Died: June 6, 1820 (aged 34–35); Aldenham, Hertfordshire, England
- Burial place: St. John the Baptist Churchyard, Aldenham
- Relatives: Frances Leighton (mother)
- Military career
- Allegiance: United Kingdom
- Branch: British Army
- Rank: Lieutenant-Colonel
- Conflicts: Napoleonic Wars; Battle of Waterloo
- Awards: Companion of the Order of the Bath
- Other work: Early observer of steam locomotion; authored 1812 letter describing Blenkinsop’s "Salamanca"

Lieutenant Colonel Leighton Cathcart Dalrymple was a British Army officer who served during the Napoleonic Wars. He commanded the 15 Light Dragoons during the Battle of Waterloo.

== Family ==
Leighton was born in 1785 to General Sir Hew Dalrymple, Baronet. He was the second son of Hew and Frances Leighton, youngest daughter and co-heiress of General Leighton of Loton Park (her father).

== Military career ==
Dalrymple likely began his military career in the early 1800s during the Napoleonic Wars. He served as an aide-de-camp to General Sir James Henry Craig. On 16 December 1813, Dalrymple was promoted to a Lieutenant Colonel in the 5th (or the King's) Regiment of Light Dragoons (Hussars). His regiment was present at the Battle of Waterloo.

== Other work ==
In 1812, while serving as a British army officer, Dalrymple visited Wakefield and Leeds to observe the pioneering steam locomotive Salamanca, designed by John Blenkinsop. He wrote a detailed letter describing the locomotive’s mechanical features and operation, and drew a sketch. This account is considered one of the earliest surviving eyewitness descriptions of a working railway engine. The letter is preserved in the Science Museum Group Collection.
