= Joachim Jérôme Quiot du Passage =

French military leader

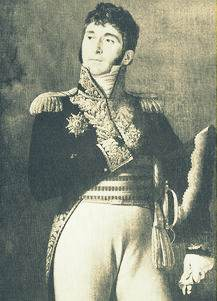
- Born: 9 February 1775; Alixan, Drôme
- Died: 12 January 1849 (aged 73); Le Passage, Isère
- Military career
- Allegiance: Kingdom of France; Kingdom of France; French Republic; French Empire
- Service years: 1791–1831
- Rank: Lieutenant general
- Awards: Baron of the Empire; Legion of Honour; Order of Saint Louis

Joachim Jérôme Quiot du Passage (English: /kjoʊ duː pɑːˈsɑːʒ/ kyo-doo-pa-SAZH, French: [ʒwaʃɛ̃ ʒeʁom kjo dy pasaʒ]; 2 February 1775 – 12 January 1849) was a French military leader who served in the French Revolutionary Wars and Napoleonic Wars.

== Military career ==
=== Early career ===
Joachim Jérôme Quiot du Passage joined the 3rd Volunteer Battalion of Drôme under Claude-Victor Perrin in the fall of 1791, when he was just sixteen. Assigned to the Army of the Alps, his unit elected him captain in 1793. He first saw battle at the siege of Toulon before being transferred to the Army of the Eastern Pyrenees. Quiot du Passage was restationed with the Army of Italy following the 1795 Peace of Basel that ended the War of the Pyrenees. He served under Napoleon Bonaparte during his 1796-1799 campaign in Italy. He was reunited with Perrin, now a general, and served as Perrin’s aide-de-camp. Quiot was wounded at the Battle of Rivoli and later commanded the left wing of Perrin’s division during the Battle of Marengo, which drove Austria out of Italy.

=== Commander in Napoleonic Wars ===
As aide-de-camp to Marshal Jean Lannes in 1805, Quiot participated in the battles of Ulm and Austerlitz, before receiving his own command, that of the 100th Regiment of the Line. In 1806, he was wounded at the Battle of Jena-Auerstedt, the decisive defeat of the Prussian Army. His successful attack on the Prussian left flank earned him the Legion of Honor. When the War of the Fourth Coalition concluded in 1807, he moved to Spain where he served in the Peninsular War. He served in the brutal but successful second siege of Zaragoza in 1808-1809 and was rewarded by being made a peer of the Empire.

In 1810 Quiot defeated a Spanish division under General Luis de Lacy, taking 800 prisoners and capturing two regimental flags. During the siege of Badajoz, he led two sorties that repelled sallies by the Spanish garrison, suffering a head wound due to canister artillery fire. In 1811, after the Battle of the Gebora, he was made governor of the recently captured Portuguese city of Campo Maior, whose fortifications were not yet repaired. When Quiot learned that a large enemy force under British General William Carr Beresford was approaching, he led a rearguard action, defending against several cavalry charges as his main force retreated to Badajoz. For this feat he received praise from Marshal Édouard Mortier, one of the senior French generals in Iberia, and was promoted to the rank of brigadier general. He served in the indecisive Battle of Albuera against a combined British, Portuguese, and Spanish force before returning to France.

Quiot did not participate in the French invasion of Russia in 1812 but he did serve in the subsequent War of the Sixth Coalition under General François Antoine Teste. Wounded in the shoulder leading troops against the forces of Prussian Field Marshal Friedrich Graf Kleist von Nollendorf, Quiot became a prisoner of war. He was not released until after the defeat of Napoleon and the restoration of the Bourbon monarchs. Made a Knight of Saint Louis by Louis XVIII, he administered the territory of Drôme.

=== Hundred Days ===
When Napoleon returned to France during the Hundred Days, Quiot rallied to the restored Emperor and received command of the 1st Division under General Jean-Baptiste Drouet d'Erlon, replacing General Jacques Alexandre Allix de Vaux. During the 1815 Battle of Waterloo, his division took part in the assault on La Haye Sainte on the right of the British, Dutch, and Hanoverian defenses. The King’s German Legion resisted the attack until they ran out of ammunition, but the farmhouse was not taken until it was too late to change the course of the battle.

== Retirement and death ==
After Napoleon’s defeat and second exile, Quiot remained in good graces with the royal government. In 1823 he became a lieutenant general before retiring with a pension in 1831. He lived in Le Passage in the Isère department, serving on its departmental council for several sessions. He died on 12 January 1849 and was buried in the Saint-Roch cemetery in Grenoble. His name is inscribed on the south side of the Arc de Triomphe in Paris, France.
