= Heinrich Christoph Karl Herrmann, Reichsgraf von Wylich und Lottum =

German general (1773–1830)

Major General Heinrich Christoph Karl Herrmann
- Born: January 8, 1773; Cleves, Prussia
- Died: February 7, 1830 (aged 56–57); Berlin, Prussia
- Military career
- Allegiance: Kingdom of Prussia
- Conflicts: Napoleonic Wars

Major General Heinrich Christoph Karl Herrmann, Reichsgraf von Wylich und Lottum (8 January 1773 in Cleves – night of 7/8 February 1830, in Berlin) was a Prussian officer who fought in the Napoleonic Wars including the Waterloo Campaign in 1815.

== Sources ==
- Ernst Friedlaender (1884). "Lottum Graf von Wylich, Heinrich Christoph Karl Hermann" . Allgemeine Deutsche Biographie (in German). Vol. 19. Leipzig: Duncker & Humblot. p. 284.
