= Jean-Baptiste Jeanin =

French military commander

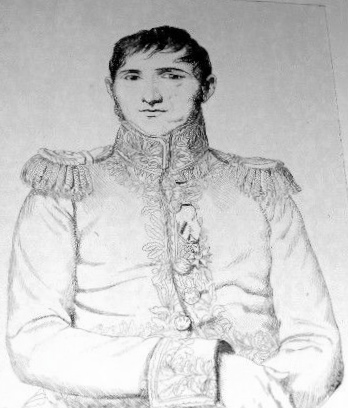
- drawing after a portrait by his father-in-law, Jacques-Louis David
- Born: 22 January 1769; Val-d'Épy
- Died: 2 May 1830 (aged 61); Saulieu

Jean-Baptiste Jeanin (French pronunciation: [ʒɑ̃ batist ʒanɛ̃]; 22 January 1771 in Val-d'Épy – 2 May 1830) was a French military commander during the French Revolutionary Wars and Napoleonic Wars, and a brigadier general during the Peninsular War. During the Hundred Days, he commanded the 20th Infantry Division at Ligny and Waterloo.
