= Friedrich Erhard von Röder =

Prussian officer (1768–1834)

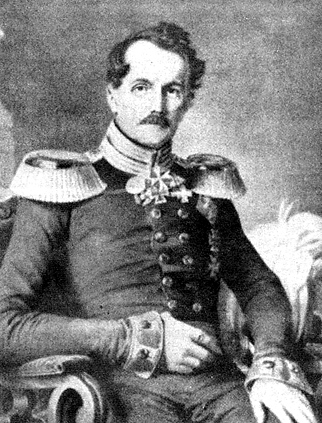
Friedrich von Röder

General of Cavalry Friedrich Erhard Leopold von Röder (24 January 1768 – 7 December 1834) was a Prussian officer during the Napoleonic Wars, and from 1818 to 1819 president of the Schlesischen Gesellschaft für vaterländische Kultur ("Silesian Society for patriotic culture").
