= Georg Ludwig von Wahlen-Jürgass =

Georg Ludwig Alexander von Wahlen-Jürgass (1758–1833) was a Prussian cavalry officer during the Napoleonic Wars.
