= Georg Dubislav Ludwig von Pirch =

Prussian military office

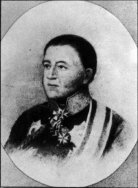
- Born: 13 December 1763; Magdeburg, Duchy of Magdeburg, Kingdom of Prussia, Holy Roman Empire
- Died: 3 April 1838 (aged 74); Berlin, Kingdom of Prussia
- Burial place: Invalids' Cemetery
- Relatives: Otto Karl Lorenz von Pirch (brother)
- Military career
- Allegiance: Prussia
- Branch: Prussian Army
- Conflicts: Napoleonic Wars

Georg Dubislav Ludwig von Pirch (13 December 1763 – 3 April 1838) was a Prussian lieutenant general who fought in the Napoleonic Wars, participating in the battles of Leipzig and Waterloo. He is sometimes referred as Pirch I to distinguish him from his younger brother, Otto Karl Lorenz von Pirch, referred as Pirch II.

== Biography ==
Georg Dubislav Ludwig von Pirch was born on 13 December 1763 in Magdeburg.

In 1775 Pirch began his career in the Prussian military, becoming a cadet in the Hessen-Kassel Nr. 45 infantry regiment. In 1787 he saw action in the Prussian invasion of Holland and in 1793 he participated in Siege of Mainz. He became a French prisoner for two years after Prussian defeat in Battle of Jena in 1806. When the War of the Sixth Coalition began Pirch was appointed commander of a brigade in April 1813. Serving under the Army of Bohemia, he fought in the battles of Lützen, Bautzen, Dresden, and Kulm, earning promotion to the rank of Major General and both classes of the Iron Cross. At the Battle of Leipzig he led the capture of the village of Probstheida, despite suffering heavy casualties in his brigade; for his role in the battle he was awarded the Pour le Mérite with oak leaves and the Russian Order of Saint Anna 1st class. In 1814 he participated in the Battle of Laon under the command of Blücher.

In May 1815 General Karl Ludwig von Borstell, commander of the Prussian II Corps, was sent home after protesting against the rough treatment of revolting Saxon units. Pirch replaced him as commander of the corps. At the beginning of Waterloo campaign, II Corps under Pirch's command numbered 30,000 men and officers. The corps was heavily engaged in the Battle of Ligny on 16 June, suffering about 6,000 casualties and similar number of deserters. On 18 June Pirch's Corps set off from Wavre following after Bülow's IV Corps, eventually reaching Napoleon's flank at the Battle of Waterloo. Pirch's leading unit, 5th Infantry Brigade, joined the heavy fighting over Plancenoit village. Only part of Pirch's II Corps saw action in the battle, with a significant portion being bogged down in muddy country roads. After the battle Pirch was tasked with stopping the retreat of Grouchy's force at Wavre, but his assault on Namur failed due to the exhaustion of his troops and lack of reconnaissance. After Waterloo Pirch handed over the command of II Corps to Prince Augustus of Prussia.

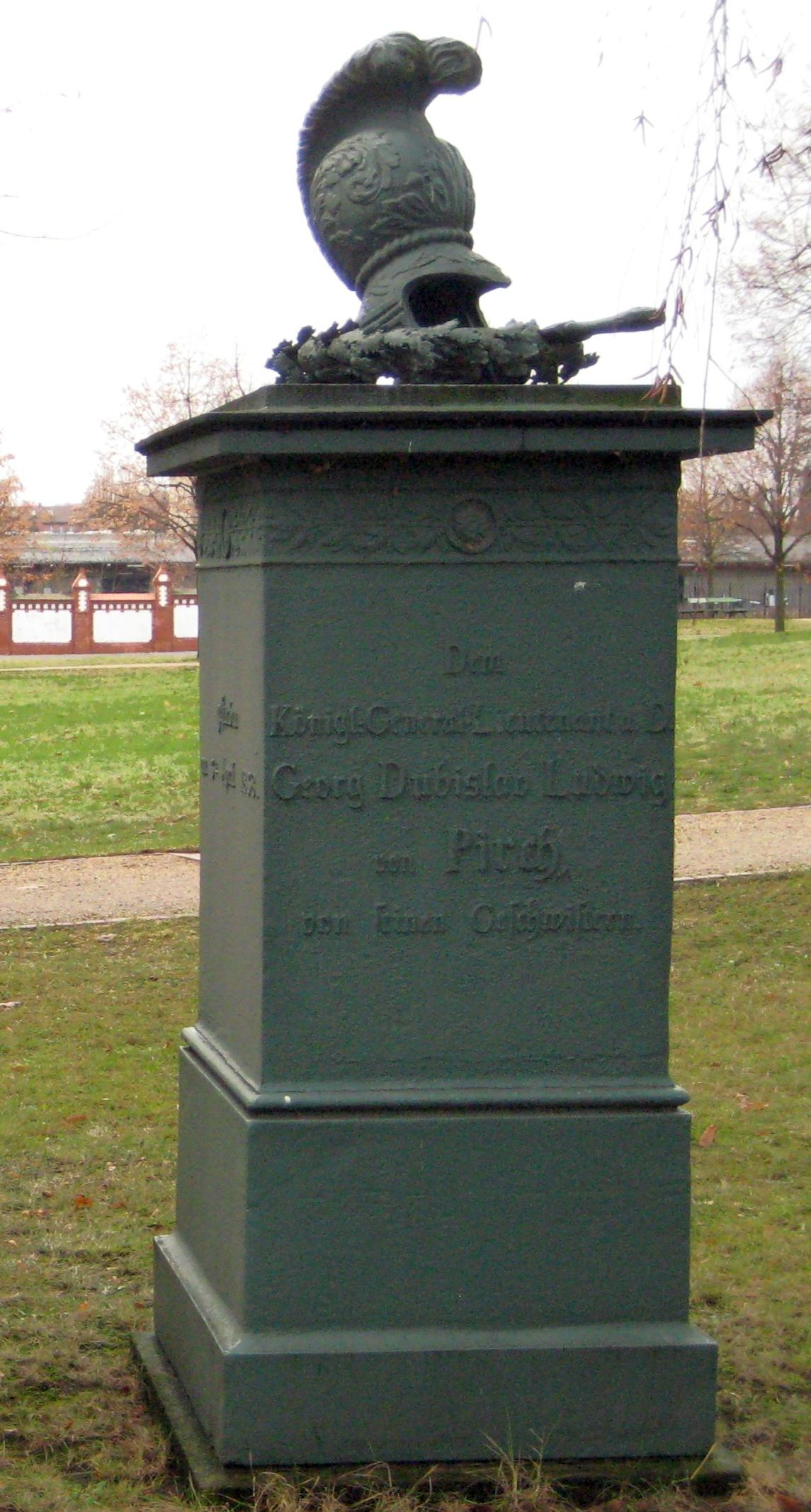
Grave of Pirch at the Invalids' Cemetery

After the end of the war Pirch was promoted to lieutenant general and received a gift of 4,000 thaler and multiple awards, including the Order of the Red Eagle 1st class with oak leaves and the Russian Order of St. George 3rd class. He retired in 1816 as increasing deafness made him unfit for service. Pirch died in Berlin on 3 April 1838.

== Assessment ==
Prussian general August von Nostitz characterized Pirch as a leader better suited for lower level commands, where he would properly carry out his orders, and would not be required to act independently taking into account circumstances and greater goals.

== Bibliography ==
- Hofschroer, Peter (2005). Waterloo 1815: Quatre Bras: Quatre Bras. Pen and Sword. ISBN 9781473801240.
- Smith, Digby (2011). "Prussian Generals of the Napoleonic Wars 1793-1815: Pirch, Georg Dubislav Ludwig von (Pirch I)". The Napoleon Series.
- Summerville, Christopher (2014). Who was Who at Waterloo: A Biography of the Battle. Routledge. ISBN 9781317868187.
