= Karl Friedrich Franciscus von Steinmetz =

Prussian officer and cartographer

Karl Friedrich von Steinmetz
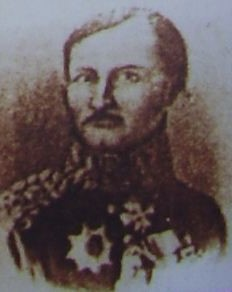
- Karl Friedrich von Steinmetz
- Born: October 26, 1768; Silesia, Prussia
- Died: March 11, 1837 (aged 68); Potsdam, Prussia
- Relatives: Field Marshal Karl Friedrich von Steinmetz (nephew and son-in-law)
- Military career
- Allegiance: Kingdom of Prussia
- Branch: Prussian Army
- Rank: Brigadier General
- Conflicts: Napoleonic Wars, Waterloo campaign

Karl Friedrich von Steinmetz (26 October 1768 in Silesia – 11 March 1837 in Potsdam) was a Prussian officer and cartographer who fought in the Napoleonic Wars. Steinmetz commanded a brigade in the Waterloo campaign. He was the uncle, and through his daughter Julie, father-in-law of Field Marshal Karl Friedrich von Steinmetz.
