= Jean-Siméon Domon =

French cavalry officer

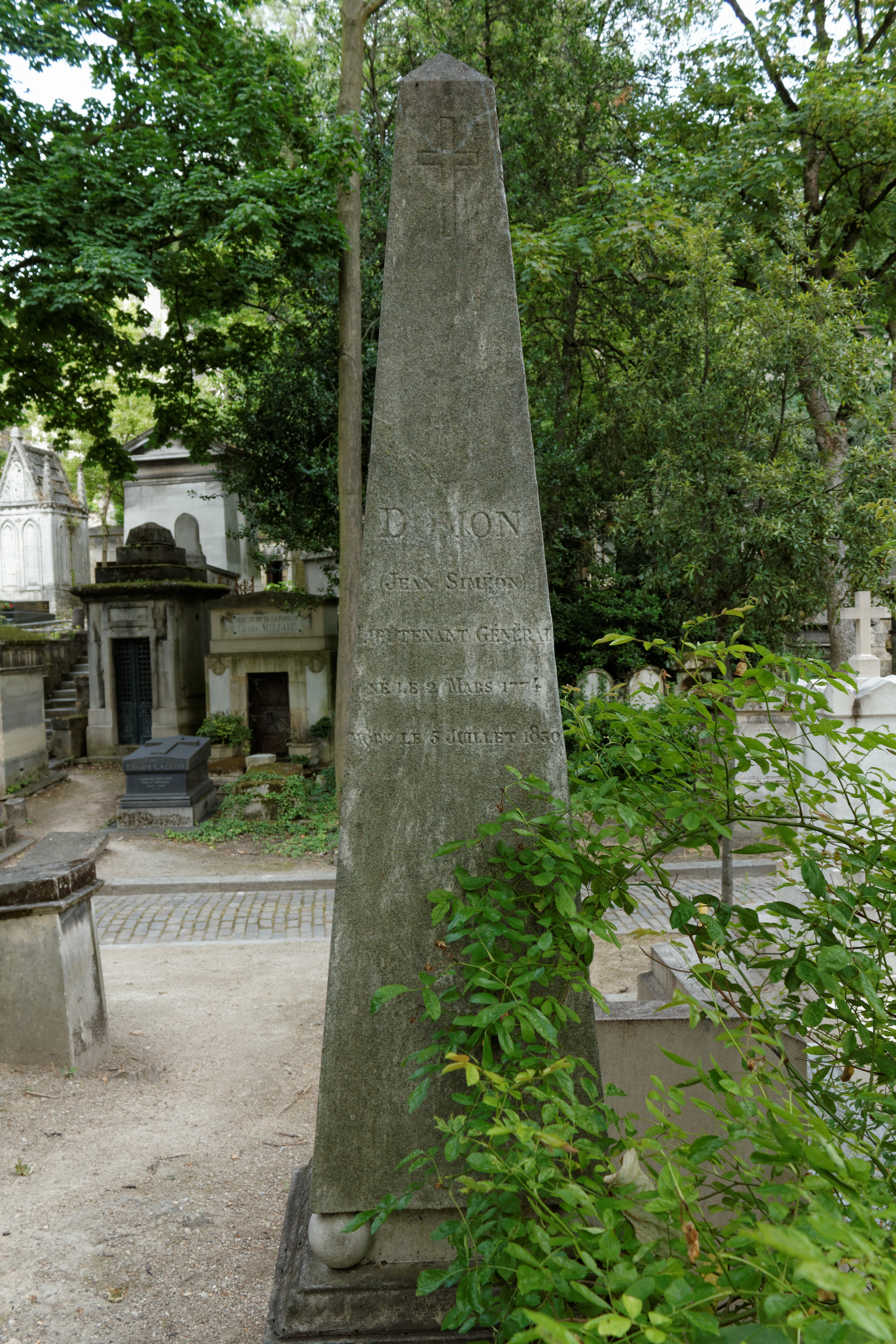
Grave obelisk of Jean Simeon Domon in the Père-Lachaise Cemetery, Paris.

Jean Siméon Domon (French pronunciation: [ʒɑ̃ sime.ɔ̃ dɔmɔ̃]; 2 March 1774 in Leforest, Maurepas – 5 July 1830 In Paris), was a French cavalry officer during the French Revolutionary and Napoleonic Wars.
