= Zastrow =

Zastrow is a surname. Notable people with the surname include:

- Alexander Heinrich Gebhard von Zastrow (1768–1815), Prussian officer
- Berndt Zastrow-Küssow (1802–1872), Prussian-American politician
- Charles Zastrow (born 1942), American social scientist
- Heinrich von Zastrow (1801–1875), Prussian general
- Holger Zastrow (born 1969), German politician
- Mitja Zastrow (born 1977), Dutch swimmer
