= News channel (disambiguation) =

A news channel is a specialty television channel which focus on presenting news content.

News channel may also refer to:

- ABS-CBN News Channel, an English-language news TV channel for Filipino audiences
- All News Channel, a former American TV channel
- CTV News Channel (disambiguation)
- Fox News Channel, an American news network
- ITV News Channel, a defunct British television news channel
- TVB News Channel, a Hong Kong 24-hour non-stop news channel
- The News Channel (Australian TV channel), a defunct Australian television news channel
- the Wii Menu channel
