= NewsOne =

NewsOne or News 1 or variations, may refer to:

- CTV News1, Canadian cable news channel
- NewsOne (Ukrainian TV channel), a former Ukrainian TV news channel
- News1, Israeli news website
- News1 (Thai TV channel)

== See also ==
- NewsON
- One News (disambiguation)
- News (disambiguation)
- One (disambiguation)
