= Unett =

Unett is a surname. Notable people with the surname include:

- Bernard Unett (1936–2000), British racing driver
- George Wilkes Unett (1772–1825), British Royal Artillery officer
