= One News =

One News or 1News or variation, may refer to:

- RTÉ News: One O'Clock (Ireland)
- One News (TV channel), a Philippine-based news channel operated by Cignal TV
- 1News (Malaysia), online TV service
- 1News, news division of New Zealand broadcaster TVNZ

== See also ==
- Channel One News (U.S.A.), content provider
- NewsOne (disambiguation)
- News (disambiguation)
- One (disambiguation)
