= George Johnstone (British Army officer) =

Major-General George Johnstone
- Died: 19 December 1825; Edinburgh, Scotland
- Other name: George Johnston
- Military career
- Allegiance: United Kingdom
- Branch: British Army
- Service years: 1780–1825
- Rank: Major-General
- Unit: 29th Regiment of Foot
- Commands: New Brunswick Fencibles; 93rd Regiment of Foot; Highland Brigade; 6th Brigade, 4th Division
- Conflicts: American Revolutionary War; French Revolutionary Wars; West Indies campaign; Fédon's rebellion; Irish Rebellion of 1798; Napoleonic Wars; Capture of Cambrai
- Awards: Waterloo Medal

Major-General George Johnstone (died 19 December 1825) was a British Army officer. He was commissioned into the infantry 1780, serving in Grenada during Fédon's rebellion in 1795–96. He was afterwards transferred to command a regiment of fencibles in New Brunswick, where he served for a year as acting Lieutenant Governor. In 1810, he was given command of a Highland regiment which served on garrison duty in Cape Colony. Johnstone was promoted to major general in 1814 and given command of the 6th Brigade in the 1815 Waterloo campaign. His brigade was not engaged in the 18 June Battle of Waterloo as they were posted to the extreme right flank, protecting the approaches to Brussels and Ostend. His men fought in the subsequent advance to Paris and helped to storm the fortress of Cambrai on 24 June.

== Early career ==
George Johnstone was appointed ensign in the 29th Regiment of Foot on 1 November 1780. He was promoted to lieutenant in 1787, captain lieutenant in 1792, adjutant in 1793 and captain in 1794. During this time, the regiment was based at various locations in England, but in early 1793, they were posted to Hilsea Barracks near Portsmouth, where they were to provide detachments of soldiers to act as marines aboard Royal Navy warships during the War of the First Coalition. At the end of December 1794, Johnstone joined a battalion of 21 officers and 640 men, formed from those in the 29th who were not detached to warships; they embarked on the troopship Maria for the Caribbean island of Grenada, where discontent would lead to an insurrection, known as Fédon's Rebellion or the Brigand's War, in the coming months. On their return to England in July 1796, the battalion had been reduced by battle casualties and disease to 5 officers and 87 men. Johnstone was promoted to major in 1799.

On 9 July 1803, Johnstone was promoted to lieutenant colonel and posted to operational command of the New Brunswick Fencibles, a new local defence regiment later redesignated the 104th (New Brunswick) Regiment of Foot. Johnstone was in Scotland at the time of his appointment and recruited Scottish and Irish men for his new regiment before embarking for British North America. The British province of New Brunswick was regarded as strategically important because of its border with the United States; however, the appointed lieutenant governor, Thomas Carleton, had returned to the United Kingdom early in 1803 and refused to return in a dispute about seniority. Therefore, the duties of the office fell upon the senior British officer in the province, a role undertaken by Johnstone between December 1808 and April 1809. Johnstone wrote to the Governor General, Sir James Henry Craig, requesting a temporary promotion to brigadier general so that he could wield more influence with the Legislative Assembly and asking for compensation for his loss of pay caused by relinquishing command of his regiment while in office; however, neither request was accepted before the end of his tenure.

After resuming command of the New Brunswick Fencibles, Johnstone returned to the United Kingdom on leave in December 1809. While at home, he was posted to command the 93rd (Highland) Regiment of Foot, which had been on garrison duty in the Cape Colony (in present-day South Africa) since their participation in the Battle of Blaauwberg in 1806. He remained with the regiment there for four years until he was summoned home and promoted in 1814.

== Waterloo campaign ==
By the time of the Waterloo campaign in 1815 Johnstone had risen to the rank of major general. He commanded the 6th Brigade in Charles Colville's 4th Division, his command included:

- 2nd battalion, 35th (Sussex) Regiment of Foot
- 1st battalion, 54th (West Norfolk) Regiment of Foot
- 2nd battalion, 59th (2nd Nottinghamshire) Regiment of Foot
- 1st battalion, 91st Regiment of Foot

Colville's division formed the extreme right wing of the British army in the campaign and was tasked with preventing the French from outflanking Wellington and threatening Brussels from the south west. On 18 June, the morning of the Battle of Waterloo, the 6th Brigade were encamped at Braine-le-Comte, together with James Frederick Lyon's 6th Hanoverian Brigade of the same division. During the day of the battle they were ordered to move back to a position 1 mile (1.6 km) south south-west of Halle to protect the approach to Brussels from the Braine-le-Comte and Enghien roads. This position also protected the route to the British supply depot at Ostend.

Colville's other brigade, Hugh Henry Mitchell's 4th Brigade, was deployed on the Waterloo battlefield, at the extreme right of the British army at Braine-l'Alleud. Johnstone and Lyon's brigades were not engaged on the day of the battle, though they may have dissuaded a body of French cavalry from probing the flank; Colville's brigade was lightly engaged in fighting associated with the French attack on Hougoumont. Despite Wellington's army being hard pressed at times he refused to draw men from the 4th Division into the main battle as he considered their role on the flank as too important. The men of Johnstone's division remained ignorant of the fact that a major battle was being fought just a few miles away.

Colville's division played a key part in the allied pursuit of the French the morning after the battle; Johnstone was ordered to march early to occupy Nivelles. Johnstone and Mitchell's brigades stormed Cambrai on 24 June and reached the outskirts of Paris on 30 June, the war ending soon afterwards. The units of Johnstone's brigade did not receive the "Waterloo" battle honour but were awarded the Waterloo Medal and additional pay allowances related to the battle.

== Death ==
Johnstone died at Edinburgh on 19 December 1825.
