= Heinrich von Zastrow =

Alexander Friedrich Adolf Heinrich von Zastrow
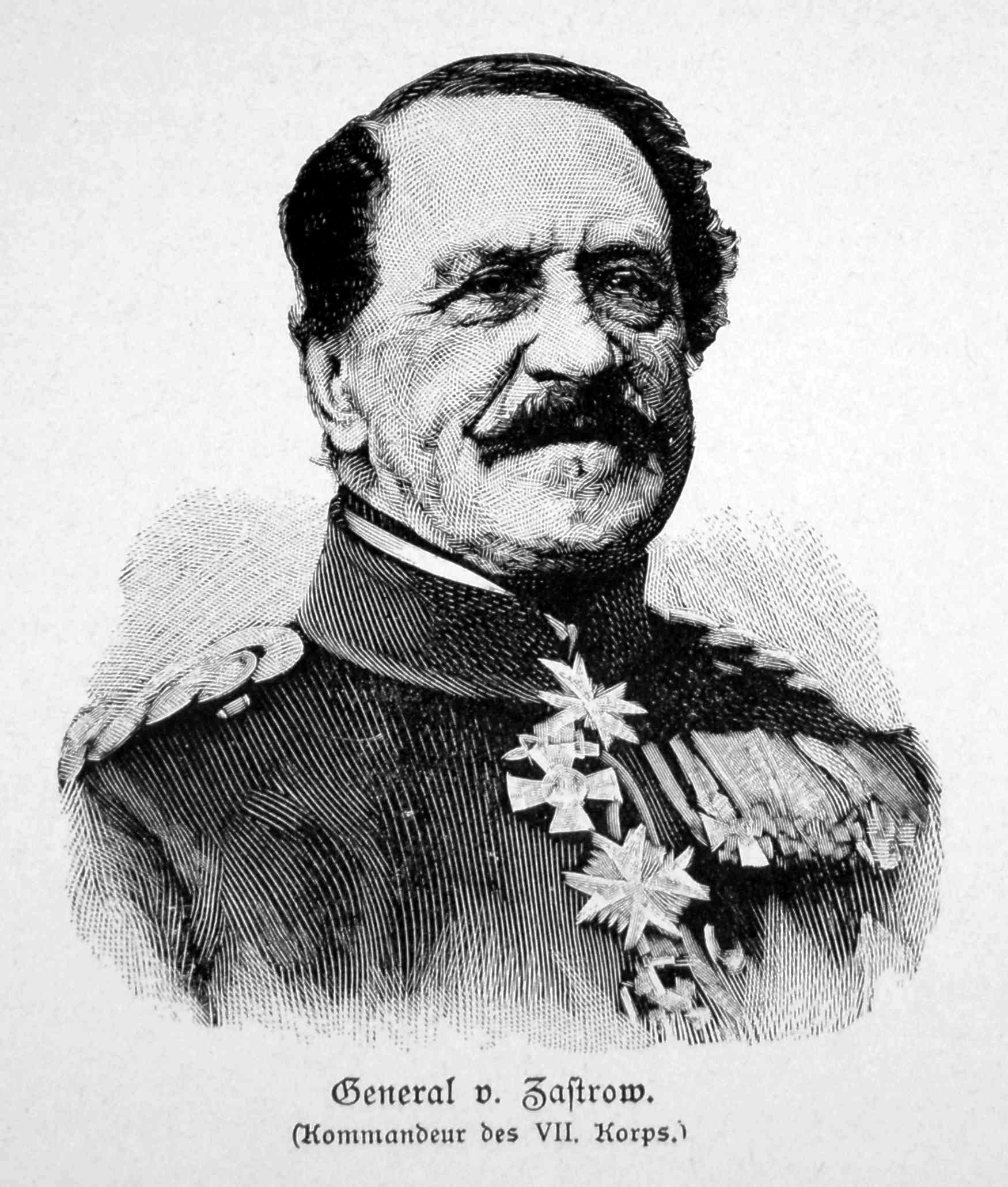
- Born: 11 August 1801; Danzig
- Died: 12 August 1875 (aged 74); Schöneberg, Berlin
- Military career
- Allegiance: (Kingdom of Prussia) Prussia; (German Empire) Imperial Germany
- Branch: Prussian Army
- Rank: General of the Infantry
- Commands: 11th Division; VII Corps
- Conflicts: Austro-Prussian War; Franco-Prussian War
- Awards: Pour le Mérite

Alexander Friedrich Adolf Heinrich von Zastrow (11 August 1801 – 12 August 1875) was a Prussian general who served in the Austro-Prussian War and the Franco-German War.

== Life ==
Heinrich von Zastrow was born in 1801 a member of the ancient noble Zastrow family, the son of Alexander Heinrich Gebhard von Zastrow (1768–1815) and Mathilde von Blankenstein (1777–1868). Zastrow entered the Prussian infantry as a second lieutenant in 1819. In 1836 he became a member of the Prussian General Staff. From 1839 to 1842 he was sent to Turkey. Zastrow was promoted to major in 1848 and served in Schleswig. In 1850 he was given command of a battalion in the 2nd Infantry Regiment. In 1852 Zastrow was made commandant of the garrison at Stralsund. In 1856, aged 55, Zastrow married countess Ottilie von Rantzau, who was sixteen years his junior. Promoted to colonel he commanded the 28th Infantry Regiment and afterwards the 19th brigade as a major general. In 1863 he was given command of the 11th Infantry Division with the rank of lieutenant-general.

During the Austro-Prussian War Heinrich von Zastrow commanded 11th Division part of Second Army. He participated in the Battle of Königgrätz. During the battle, his division captured Nedeliste. On 16 September 1866, Zastrow was awarded the Pour le Mérite. When the Franco-German War erupted in 1870 Zastrow was given command of VII Corps (part of Steinmetz's First Army), with which he distinguished himself at Spicheren, Gravelotte and the siege of Metz. After the fall of Metz Zastrow besieged Thionville, Montmédy and Mézières. In the last phase of the war VII Corps was part of Manteuffel's Army of the South. After the end of the war he was given a dotation of 100.000 thaler in recognition of his service. He retired from the army in 1872.
