= Noos =

Noos may refer to

- Nous or noos, concept in Greek philosophy
- Noos, French cable operator and ISP now merged with Numericable
- North West Shelf Operational Oceanographic System (NOOS)
- Nóos case, corruption case in Spain
- Joseph François Noos (1766 – 1826), French army officer
