= Poix-du-Nord =

- Commune
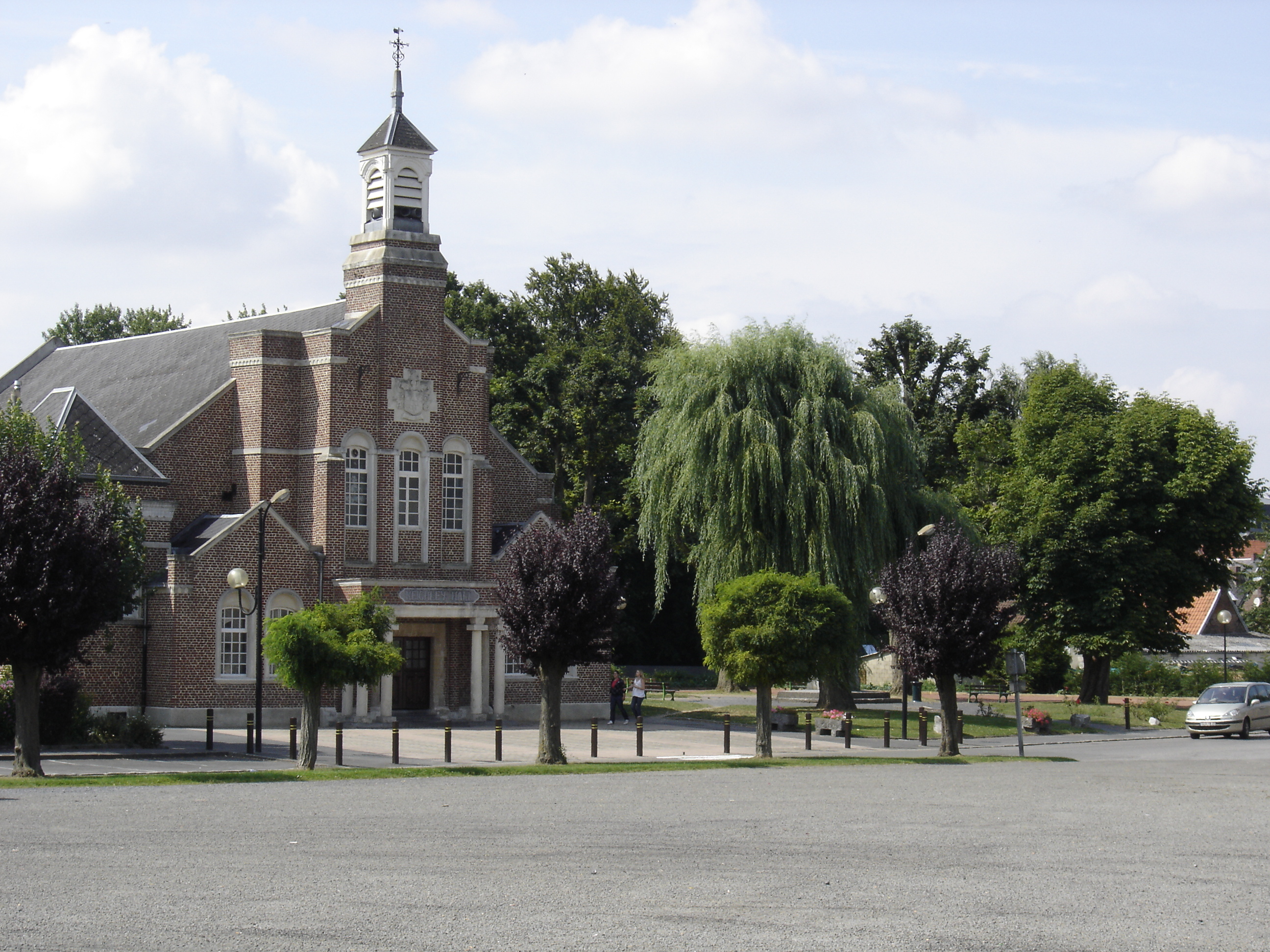
- Keighley Hall

- Coat of arms
- Location of Poix-du-Nord
- Location within France Location within Hauts-de-France
- Coordinates: 50°11′23″N 3°36′31″E
- Country: France
- Region: Hauts-de-France
- Department: Nord
- Arrondissement: Avesnes-sur-Helpe
- Canton: Avesnes-sur-Helpe
- Intercommunality: Pays de Mormal

Government
  - Mayor (2020–2026): Jean-Pierre Mazingue
- Area^{1}: 8.67 km^{2} (3.35 sq mi)
- Elevation: 126 m (413 ft)
- Highest elevation: 151 m (495 ft)
- Lowest elevation: 104 m (341 ft)
- Population (2023): 2,126
  - Density: 245/km^{2} (635/sq mi)
- Time zone: UTC+01:00 (CET)
  - Summer (DST): UTC+02:00 (CEST)
- INSEE/Postal code: 59464 /59218
- ^{1} French Land Register data, which excludes lakes, ponds, glaciers > 1 km^{2} (0.386 sq mi or 247 acres) and river estuaries.

Poix-du-Nord (French pronunciation: [pwa dy nɔʁ]) is a commune in the Nord department in northern France, in the region of Hauts-de-France.

== Population ==
Historical population
| Year | Pop. | ±% p.a. |
|---|---|---|
| 1968 | 2,134 | — |
| 1975 | 2,259 | +0.82% |
| 1982 | 2,277 | +0.11% |
| 1990 | 2,056 | −1.27% |
| 1999 | 2,013 | −0.23% |
| 2007 | 2,023 | +0.06% |
| 2012 | 2,182 | +1.52% |
| 2017 | 2,203 | +0.19% |
| 2023 | 2,126 | −0.59% |
Source: INSEE

== Heraldry ==
| Arms of Poix-du-Nord | The arms of Poix-du-Nord are blazoned : Vair, 3 pales gules. (Englefontaine, Louvignies-Quesnoy, Poix-du-Nord and Saint-Waast-la-Vallée use the same arms.) |

== History ==
World War I (1914-1918): The end of the Great War (1914-1918) was marked by a civilian tragedy. As fierce fighting raged for control of the Englefontaine crossroads between the British and Germans, the civilian population of Poix-du-Nord sought refuge in the cellars of their village homes. At that time (late October 1918), German artillery was still firing shells from its position in the Mormal Forest, including gas shells (it is estimated that in 1918, one in five shells fired was gas-laced). Civilians were thus trapped in the village cellars. On October 24, 1918, the town was liberated by British troops. The bombardments resulted in 58 civilian casualties and 95 soldiers killed. An extension was then made to the municipal cemetery to commemorate the British who fought to liberate Poix-du-Nord.

1922: Inauguration of Keighley Hall, an English-style building that now serves as a function hall. The building was financed in part by a public subscription in England with the town of Keighley (Yorkshire). At the time, the construction was entrusted to a British architect, Arthur Studgen.

== See also ==
- Communes of the Nord department
