= Belgrade, Namur =

Sub-municipality of the city of Namur, Belgium

Belgrade Belgråde (Walloon)
- Sub-municipality of Namur
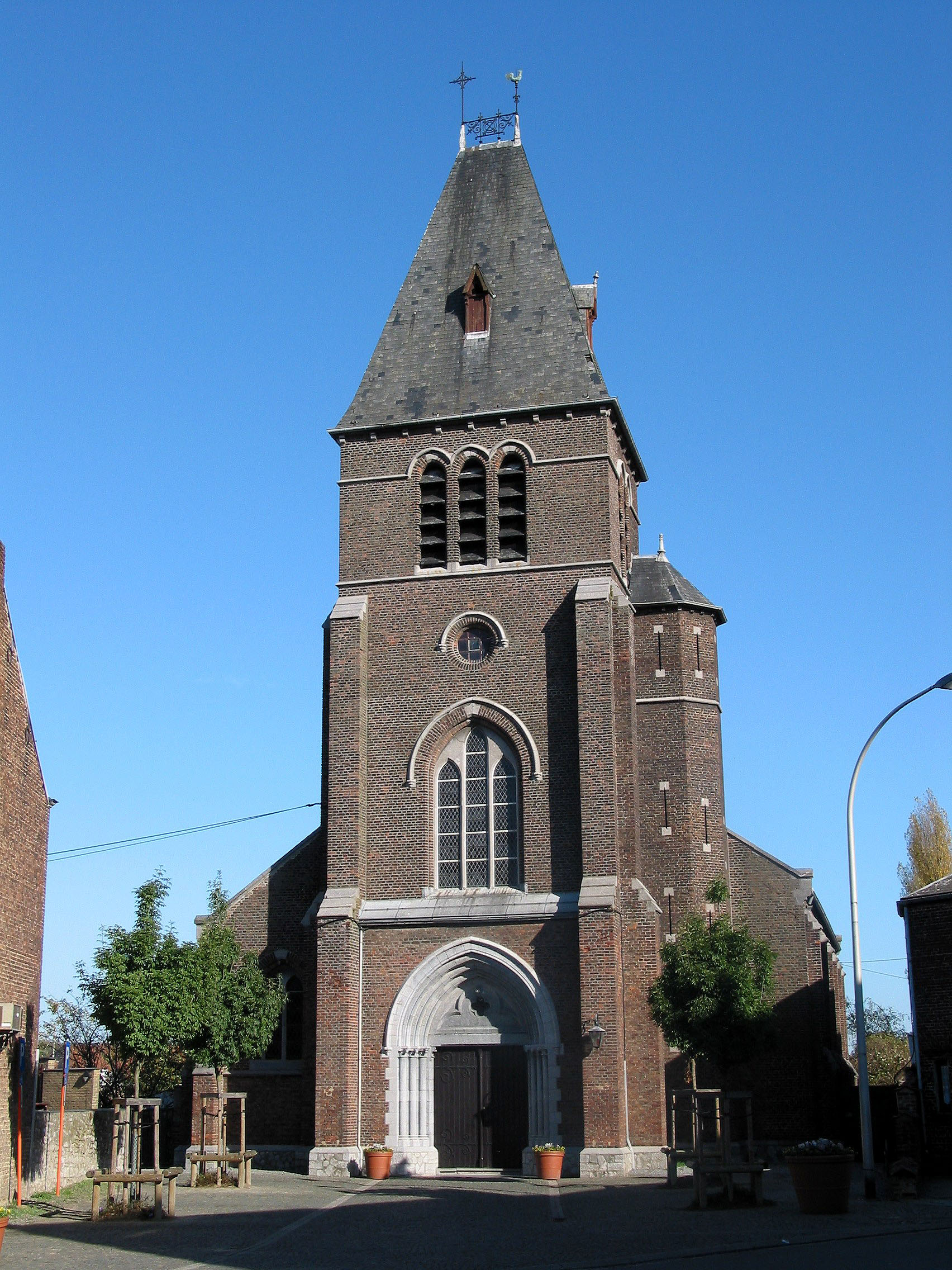
- Saint-Joseph Church

- Location of Belgrade in Namur
- Interactive map of Belgrade
- Location within Belgium Location within Namur Province
- Coordinates: 50°28′00″N 4°49′00″E
- Country: Belgium
- Community: French Community
- Region: Wallonia
- Province: Namur
- Arrondissement: Namur
- Municipality: Namur

Area
  - Total: 2.93 km^{2} (1.13 sq mi)

Population (2024-01-01)
  - Total: 5,216
  - Density: 1,780/km^{2} (4,610/sq mi)
- Postal codes: 5001
- Area codes: 081

Belgrade (French pronunciation: [bɛlɡʁad]; Walloon: Belgråde) is a sub-municipality of the city of Namur located in the province of Namur, Wallonia, Belgium. The municipality of Belgrade was formed on 2 August 1897, when it was detached from the municipality of Flawinne. On 1 January 1977, Belgrade was merged into Namur.

== History ==
It was named after Belgrade, Serbia in 1718 to commemorate the Austrian Empire's conquest of the city from the Ottoman Turks (the county of Namur was a dependency of the Austria-ruling royal house of Habsburg).
