= Saint-Waast =

- Commune
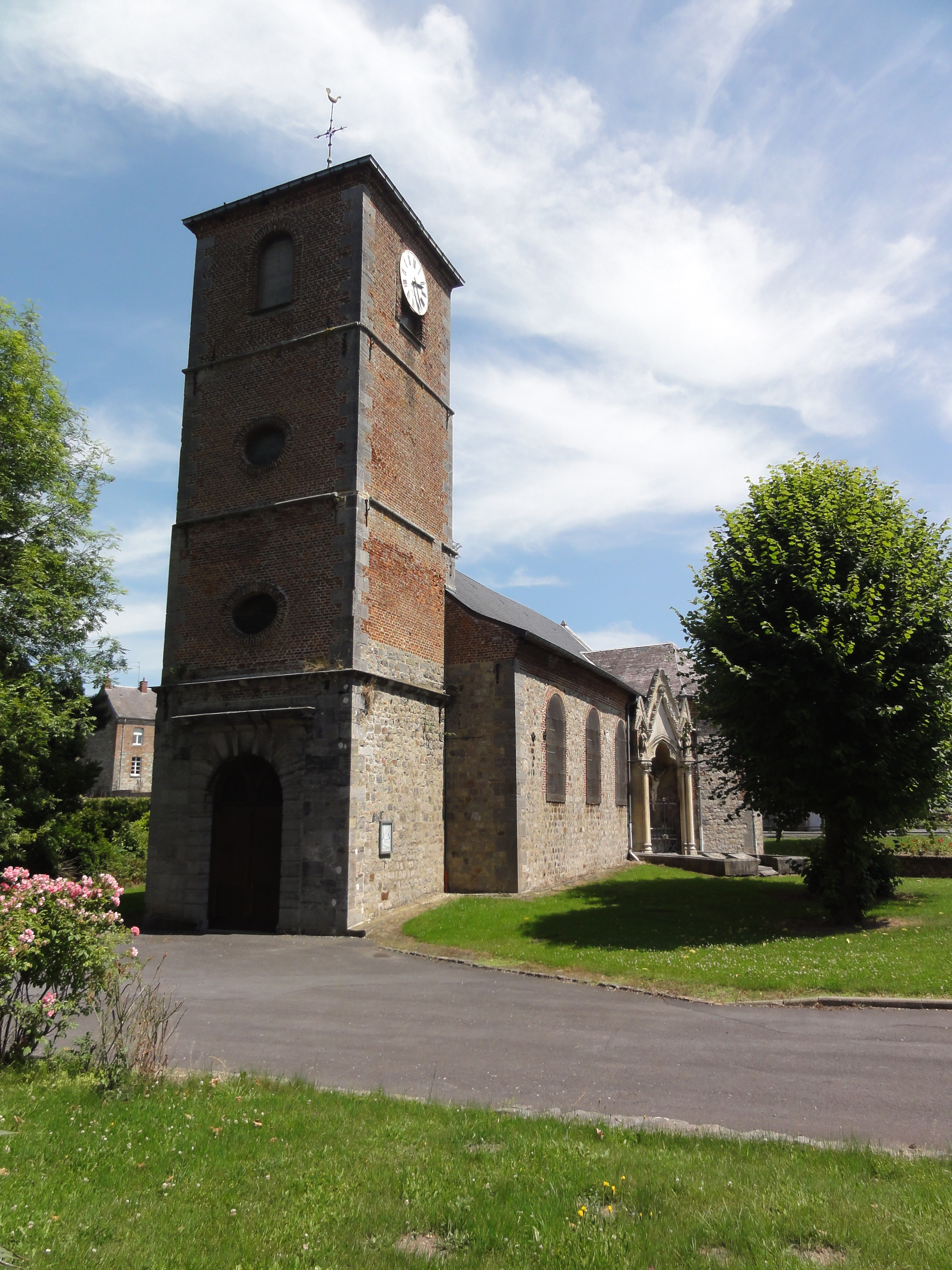
- The church in Saint-Waast

- Coat of arms
- Location of Saint-Waast
- Location within France Location within Hauts-de-France
- Coordinates: 50°18′18″N 3°44′53″E
- Country: France
- Region: Hauts-de-France
- Department: Nord
- Arrondissement: Avesnes-sur-Helpe
- Canton: Aulnoye-Aymeries
- Intercommunality: CC Pays de Mormal

Government
  - Mayor (2023–2026): Eric Hiroux
- Area^{1}: 5.91 km^{2} (2.28 sq mi)
- Elevation: 120 m (390 ft)
- Highest elevation: 142 m (466 ft)
- Lowest elevation: 85 m (279 ft)
- Population (2023): 686
  - Density: 116/km^{2} (301/sq mi)
- Time zone: UTC+01:00 (CET)
  - Summer (DST): UTC+02:00 (CEST)
- INSEE/Postal code: 59548 /59570
- ^{1} French Land Register data, which excludes lakes, ponds, glaciers > 1 km^{2} (0.386 sq mi or 247 acres) and river estuaries.

Saint-Waast is a commune in the Nord department in northern France.

== Heraldry ==
Arms of Saint-Waast	The arms of Saint-Waast are blazoned : Vair, 3 pales gules. (Englefontaine, Louvignies-Quesnoy, Poix-du-Nord and Saint-Waast-la-Vallée use the same arms.)

== Local Culture and Heritage ==
The Carrière des Nerviens Regional Nature Reserve is partially located in the communal territory just 1,700 metres (5,600 ft) south-east of the town centre.

== See also ==
- Communes of the Nord department
