= Ernst Ludwig Wilhelm von Bismarck =

Colonel Ernst Ludwig Wilhelm von Bismarck (7 April 1772 in Magdeburg – 20 June 1815 in Namur) was a Prussian officer during the Napoleonic Wars.

== Biography ==
Bismarck, born in Magdeburg on 7 April 1772 was the son of Georg Wilhelm I von Bismarck (1741–1808) and Friederike Luise Eleonore von Alvensleben. As a child, he was adopted by his uncle Achatz Christoph von Bismarck (1737–1796) and his wife née von Kaphengst, as an heir. When that couple had an own son, Heinrich Friedrich Wilhelm Achatz von Bismarck (1786-1856), Bismarck lost his position as an heir.

In 1799 Bismarck was a grenadier captain in von Kleist's regiment in Magdeburg. On 4 July 1800 he was made a knight of the Order of Saint John. In 1811 he was a major in the Foot Guards Regiment of King Frederick William III of Prussia in Potsdam. In 1814 he was a lieutenant colonel in the 1st Elbe Landwehr Regiment, and took part in the later stages of the Siege of Magdeburg. The 1st Elbe Landwehr Regiment was part of the 6th Brigade of Prussian II Corps during the Waterloo Campaign and Bismarck was its colonel. On 16 June 1815 the regiment fought at the Battle of Ligny suffering about 300 casualties. On 20 June Bismarck was killed leading his regiment in the attack on Namur which was being held by General Teste's division, the rearguard of Grouchy's wing of the French Army of the North, during the French army's retreat to Paris.

== Family ==
In Bittkau, on 10 November 1807, Bismarck married Sofie Charlotte von Plotho, daughter of Edler Lord Bittkau and Charlotte von Itzenplitz. They had six children.

== See also ==
- House of Bismarck
