= News (disambiguation) =

News is new information, typically relating to current events.

News or The News may also refer to:

== Arts and entertainment ==
=== Film, television and theatre ===
- The News (film), a 1989 Indian Malayalam film
- News (film), a 2005 Indian Kannada film
- The News (musical), a 1985 Broadway musical
- "The News" (The Amazing World of Gumball), a television episode

=== Media ===
- 5 News, a British news programme
- A News (TV series), local newscasts on the A television system in Canada
- ABC News (United States)
- ABC News (Australian TV channel), an Australian television news channel
- ABS-CBN News, a news division of Philippine media company ABS-CBN Corporation
  - ABS-CBN News Channel, an English-language news TV channel for Filipino audiences
- Africanews, a pan-African television news channel
- Australian News Channel, parent company of many Australian cable news channels
- ATV News
- Band News, a Brazilian television news channel
- BTV News, a Bangladeshi television news channel
- CBC News
  - CBC News Network
- CBS News
- CTV News
- CNews, a French television news channel
- DW News, a German news program from Deutsche Welle
- DZRH News Television, an Philippine television channel
- E! News
- Euronews, a pan-European television news channel
- Global News
- GloboNews, a Brazilian television news channel
- GMA News Online, a news website of Philippine media company GMA Network Inc.
- GMA News TV, a former domestic and current international television news channel of Philippine media company GMA Network Inc.
- iNews, an Indonesian television channel
- ITV News
  - ITV News Channel, a defunct British television news channel
- NBC News
  - NBC News NOW
- News5, a news division of Philippine media company TV5 Network
  - One News (TV channel), an Philippine television news channel
- NewsVision, a defunct Singaporean television news channel
- The News Channel (Australian TV channel), a defunct Australian television channel
- The News (Mexico City), a Mexican English-language newspaper
- The News with Brian Williams, an American television news program
- PTV News, a Pakistani television news channel
- Radio SRF 4 News, a Swiss German-language radio station
- RTÉ News
- SABC News
- Sky News, a British and international television news channel
  - Sky News Australia
  - Sky News Ireland
  - Sky News New Zealand
- TBS News (channel), a Japanese television news channel
- TV 2 News, a Danish television news channel
- TV4 News, a defunct Swedish television news channel
- TVB News
  - TVB News Channel
- Zee News, an Indian television news channel

=== Music ===
==== Performers ====
- NEWS (band), a J-pop band

==== Albums ====
- News (album), by News, 2013
- N.E.W.S. (Golden Earring album), 1984
- N·E·W·S (Prince album), 2003
- News (EP), by Tokyo Jihen, 2020
- The News, an EP by Carbon/Silicon, 2006

==== Songs ====
- "News", by Dire Straits from Communiqué, 1979
- "The News" (song), a 2022 song by Paramore
- "The News", by PartyNextDoor from Partymobile, 2020
- "The News", by Train from A Girl, a Bottle, a Boat, 2017
- "News", by tUnE-yArDs from Bird-Brains, 2009

== Companies and organizations ==
- News (publishing), an Austrian publisher of news magazines
- News Corporation, a media conglomerate
  - News Corp Australia, Australian subsidiary
  - News UK, British subsidiary
- Network of European Worldshops, a network of national associations of worldshops

== Computing ==
- A News or news, a program for serving and reading Usenet newsgroups
- news.*, one of the Big 8 (Usenet) hierarchies
- News (Apple), a news reader software bundled with iOS
- NeWS (Network extensible Window System), developed by Sun Microsystems in the mid 1980s
- Sony NEWS, a computer workstation

== Newspapers and magazines ==
=== Europe ===
- Le News, an English-language newspaper in Switzerland
- News (Austrian magazine)
- News (newspaper), a defunct newspaper based Zürich, Switzerland
- The News (Portsmouth), a newspaper in Portsmouth, England

=== North America ===
- Bangor Daily News (sometimes called "The News"), Bangor, Maine, US
- The Greenville News, Greenville, South Carolina, US
- News (National Library Service for the Blind and Physically Handicapped), a quarterly magazine published by the U.S. Library of Congress
- The News (Chicago), Illinois, US
- The News (Mexico City), a Mexican English-language newspaper
- The News (New Glasgow), a daily newspaper serving New Glasgow and Pictou County, Nova Scotia, Canada
- The News, of Frederick, Maryland, absorbed in 2002 into the Frederick News-Post
- The Port Arthur News (nicknamed "The News"), Port Arthur, Texas, US
- The Temple News (formerly nicknamed "The News"), Philadelphia, Pennsylvania, US

=== Other places ===
- The News (Adelaide), a defunct newspaper in South Australia
- The News, a newspaper in Alexandra, New Zealand
- The News International, Pakistan (Karachi, Lahore and Islamabad)

== People ==
- William Carver (Wild Bunch) (1868–1901), nicknamed "News", American Old West outlaw
- P. N. News, Paul Neu (born 1966), American professional wrestler

== See also ==
- BBC News
- Noos (disambiguation)
- New (disambiguation)
