= Louvignies-Quesnoy =

- Commune
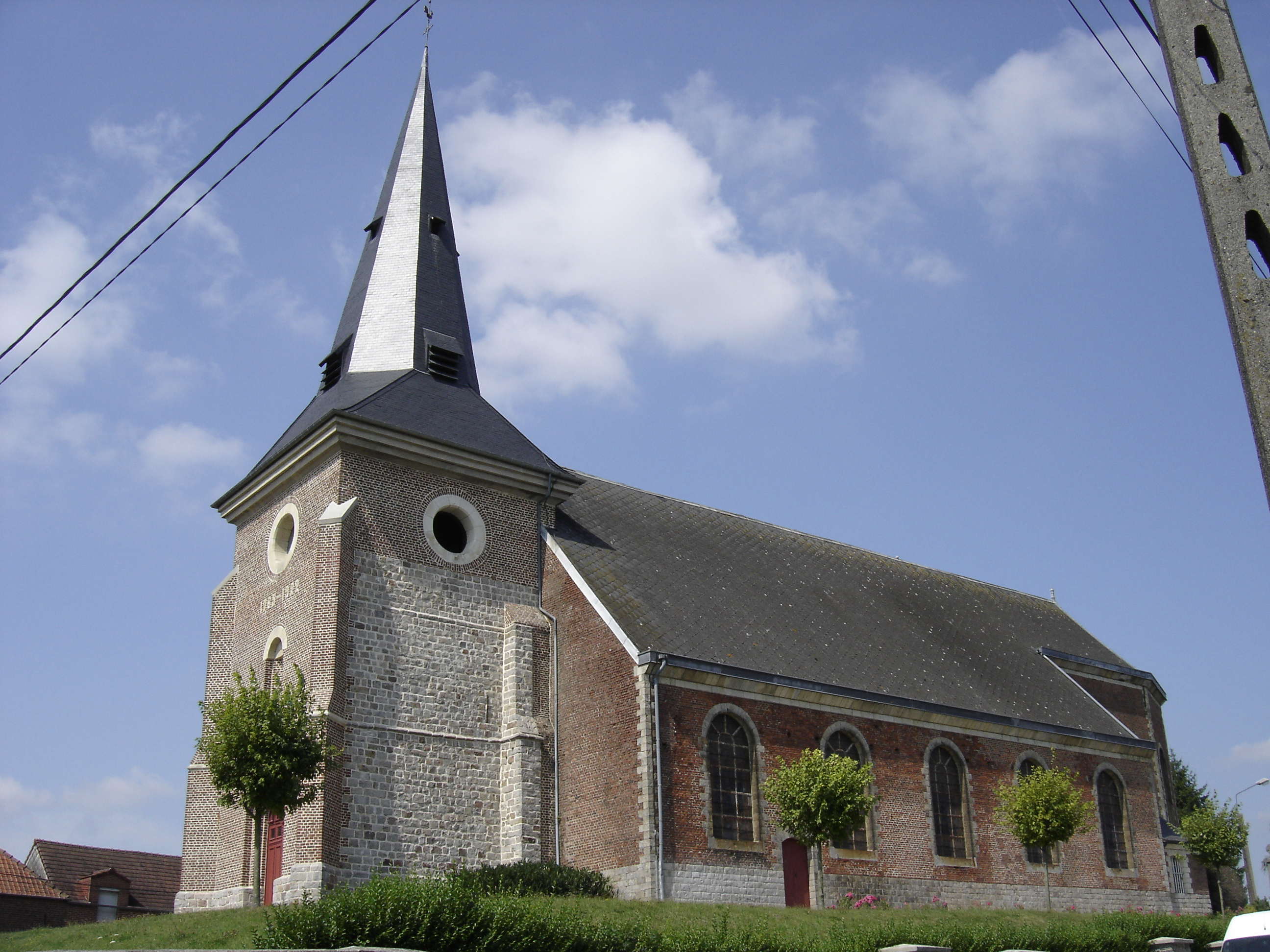
- The church in Louvignies-Quesnoy

- Coat of arms
- Location of Louvignies-Quesnoy
- Location within France Location within Hauts-de-France
- Coordinates: 50°13′29″N 3°38′35″E
- Country: France
- Region: Hauts-de-France
- Department: Nord
- Arrondissement: Avesnes-sur-Helpe
- Canton: Avesnes-sur-Helpe
- Intercommunality: Pays de Mormal

Government
  - Mayor (2020–2026): Alain Michaux
- Area^{1}: 8.43 km^{2} (3.25 sq mi)
- Elevation: 130 m (430 ft)
- Highest elevation: 148 m (486 ft)
- Lowest elevation: 107 m (351 ft)
- Population (2023): 899
  - Density: 107/km^{2} (276/sq mi)
- Time zone: UTC+01:00 (CET)
  - Summer (DST): UTC+02:00 (CEST)
- INSEE/Postal code: 59363 /59530
- ^{1} French Land Register data, which excludes lakes, ponds, glaciers > 1 km^{2} (0.386 sq mi or 247 acres) and river estuaries.

Louvignies-Quesnoy (French pronunciation: [luviɲi kenwa]) is a commune in the Nord department in northern France.

It is 2 km (1.2 mi) south of Le Quesnoy.

== Heraldry ==
Arms of Louvignies-Quesnoy	The arms of Louvignies-Quesnoy are blazoned : Vair, 3 pales gules. (Englefontaine, Louvignies-Quesnoy, Poix-du-Nord and Saint-Waast-la-Vallée use the same arms.)

== See also ==
- Communes of the Nord department
