= Château de Flawinne =

Castle in Flawinne, Belgium

Coordinates: 50.46641°N 4.800925°E

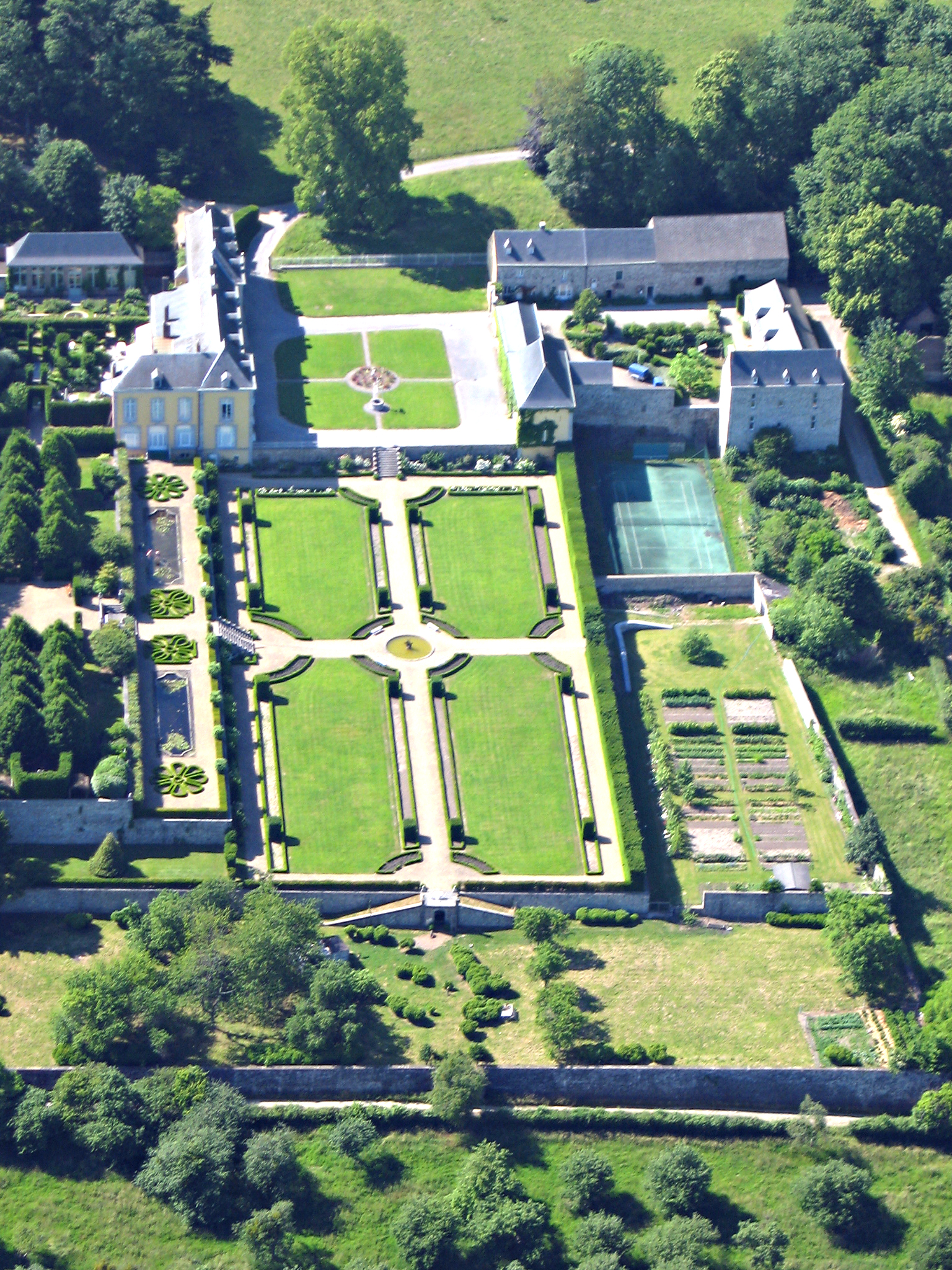
Château de Flawinne in Flawinne

The château de Flawinne or Castle of Flawinne is in the Belgian village of Flawinne on the outskirts of Namur, Wallonia.
