= Fesmy-le-Sart =

- Commune
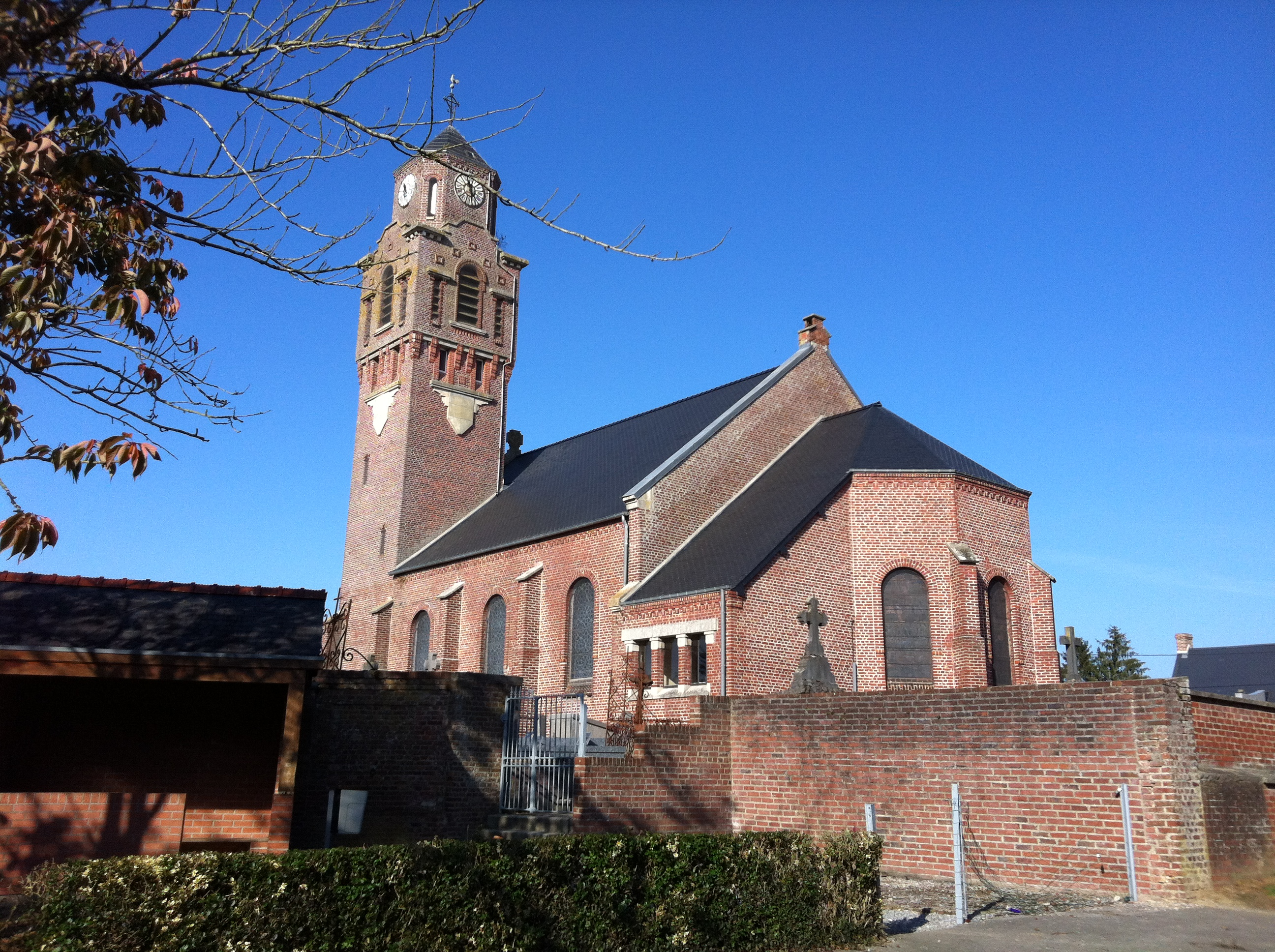
- The church of Fesmy-le-Sart
- Location of Fesmy-le-Sart
- Location within France Location within Hauts-de-France
- Coordinates: 50°02′33″N 3°40′45″E
- Country: France
- Region: Hauts-de-France
- Department: Aisne
- Arrondissement: Vervins
- Canton: Guise
- Intercommunality: Thiérache du Centre

Government
  - Mayor (2026–32): Gaspard Riou
- Area^{1}: 16.06 km^{2} (6.20 sq mi)
- Elevation: 150 m (490 ft)
- Highest elevation: 192 m (630 ft)
- Lowest elevation: 137 m (449 ft)
- Population (2023): 519
  - Density: 32.3/km^{2} (83.7/sq mi)
- Time zone: UTC+01:00 (CET)
  - Summer (DST): UTC+02:00 (CEST)
- INSEE/Postal code: 02308 /02450
- ^{1} French Land Register data, which excludes lakes, ponds, glaciers > 1 km^{2} (0.386 sq mi or 247 acres) and river estuaries.

Fesmy-le-Sart (French pronunciation: [fɛmi lə saʁ]) is a commune in the Aisne department in Hauts-de-France in northern France.

== Population ==
Historical population
Year	Pop.	±% p.a.
1968	625	—
1975	555	−1.68%
1982	509	−1.23%
1990	485	−0.60%
1999	463	−0.51%
2007	474	+0.29%
2012	509	+1.44%
2017	486	−0.92%
2023	519	+1.10%
Source: INSEE

== See also ==
- Communes of the Aisne department
