= Nouvion-et-Catillon =

- Commune
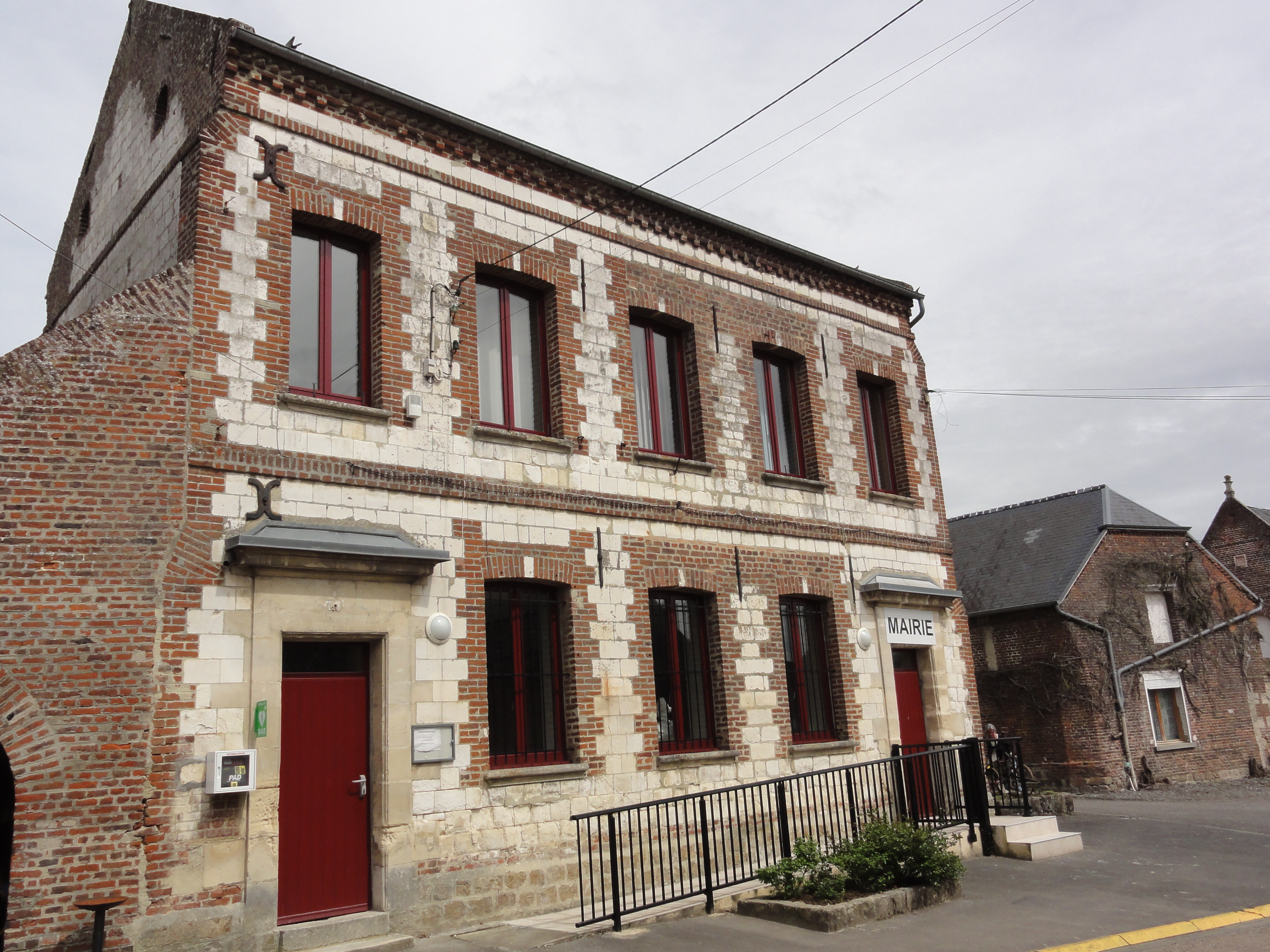
- The town hall of Nouvion-et-Catillon
- Location of Nouvion-et-Catillon
- Location within France Location within Hauts-de-France
- Coordinates: 49°42′08″N 3°29′06″E
- Country: France
- Region: Hauts-de-France
- Department: Aisne
- Arrondissement: Laon
- Canton: Marle
- Intercommunality: Pays de la Serre

Government
  - Mayor (2026–32): Thierry Lecomte
- Area^{1}: 16.67 km^{2} (6.44 sq mi)
- Elevation: 45 m (148 ft)
- Highest elevation: 122 m (400 ft)
- Lowest elevation: 52 m (171 ft)
- Population (2023): 527
  - Density: 31.6/km^{2} (81.9/sq mi)
- Time zone: UTC+01:00 (CET)
  - Summer (DST): UTC+02:00 (CEST)
- INSEE/Postal code: 02559 /02270
- ^{1} French Land Register data, which excludes lakes, ponds, glaciers > 1 km^{2} (0.386 sq mi or 247 acres) and river estuaries.

Nouvion-et-Catillon (French pronunciation: [nuvjɔ̃ e katijɔ̃]) is a commune in the Aisne department in Hauts-de-France in northern France.

== Population ==
Historical population
Year	Pop.	±% p.a.
1968	599	—
1975	573	−0.63%
1982	506	−1.76%
1990	547	+0.98%
1999	500	−0.99%
2007	535	+0.85%
2012	538	+0.11%
2017	474	−2.50%
2023	527	+1.78%
Source: INSEE

== See also ==
- Communes of the Aisne department
