= Neděliště =

- Municipality
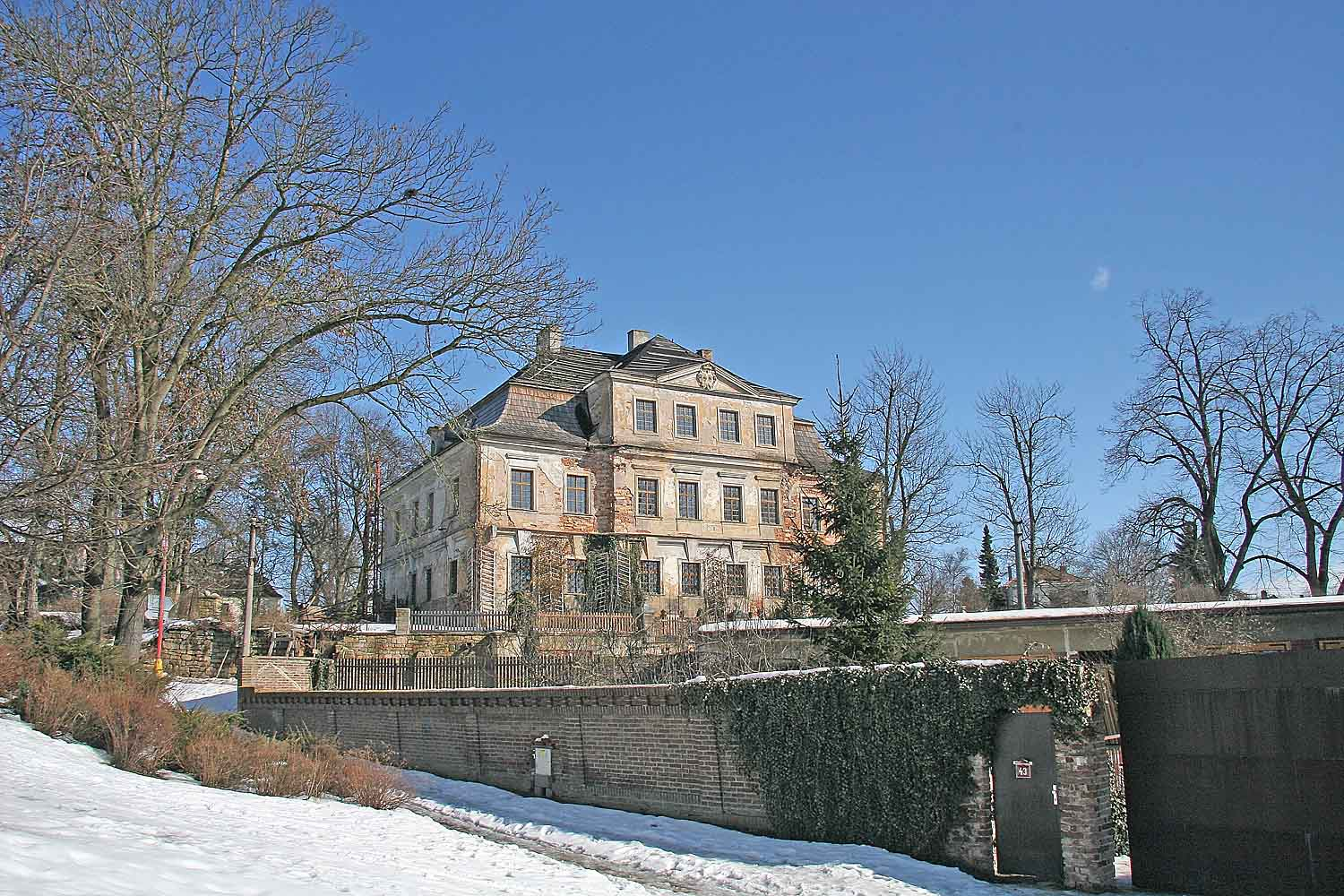
- Neděliště Castle

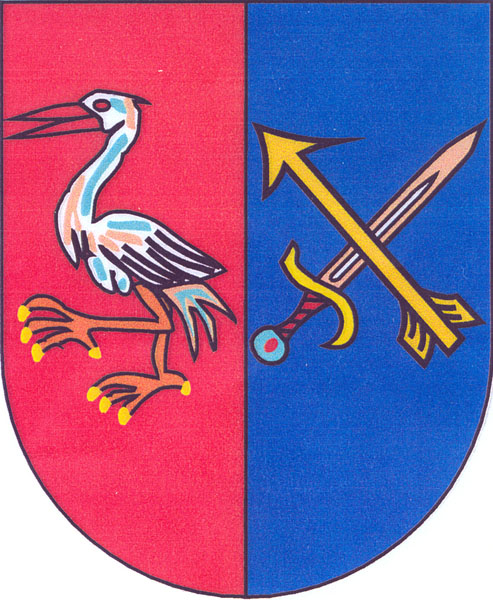
- Coat of arms

- Location in the Czech Republic
- Coordinates: 50°16′36″N 15°47′8″E
- Country: Czech Republic
- Region: Hradec Králové
- District: Hradec Králové
- First mentioned: 1073

Area
  - Total: 5.84 km^{2} (2.25 sq mi)
- Elevation: 265 m (869 ft)

Population (2026-01-01)
  - Total: 377
  - Density: 64.6/km^{2} (167/sq mi)
- Time zone: UTC+1 (CET)
  - Summer (DST): UTC+2 (CEST)
- Postal code: 503 12
- Website: www.nedeliste.cz

Neděliště (Czech pronunciation: [ˈnɛɟɛlɪʃcɛ]) is a municipality and village in Hradec Králové District in the Hradec Králové Region of the Czech Republic. It has about 400 inhabitants.

== Demographics ==
Historical population
| Year | Pop. | ±% |
|---|---|---|
| 1869 | 546 | — |
| 1880 | 521 | −4.6% |
| 1890 | 509 | −2.3% |
| 1900 | 527 | +3.5% |
| 1910 | 543 | +3.0% |
| 1921 | 544 | +0.2% |
| 1930 | 554 | +1.8% |
| 1950 | 378 | −31.8% |
| 1961 | 395 | +4.5% |
| 1970 | 360 | −8.9% |
| 1980 | 385 | +6.9% |
| 1991 | 349 | −9.4% |
| 2001 | 342 | −2.0% |
| 2011 | 351 | +2.6% |
| 2021 | 375 | +6.8% |
Source: Censuses
