= Alexander Heinrich Gebhard von Zastrow =

- Born: 20 August 1768
- Died: 23 June 1815 (aged 46)
- Military career
- Allegiance: Kingdom of Prussia
- Branch: Prussian Army
- Rank: Colonel
- Commands: 6th Infantry Brigade
- Conflicts: Napoleonic Wars; Action at Namur †

Colonel Alexander Heinrich Gebhard von Zastrow (20 August 1768 in Kolpin – 23 June 1815 in Namur) was a Prussian officer during the Napoleonic Wars.

== Biography ==
Von Zastrow was mortally wounded during the storming of Namure on 20 June 1815 leading the Prussian 6th Brigade in an attack on the French rearguard.

== Family ==
Von Zastrow was married to Mathilde von Blankenstein (1777–1868). They had a notable son:

- Heinrich (1801–1875) who became a Prussian general and served in the Austro-Prussian War and the Franco-German War
