= Flawinne =

Sub-municipality of the city of Namur, Belgium

Flawinne Flawene (Walloon)
- Sub-municipality of Namur
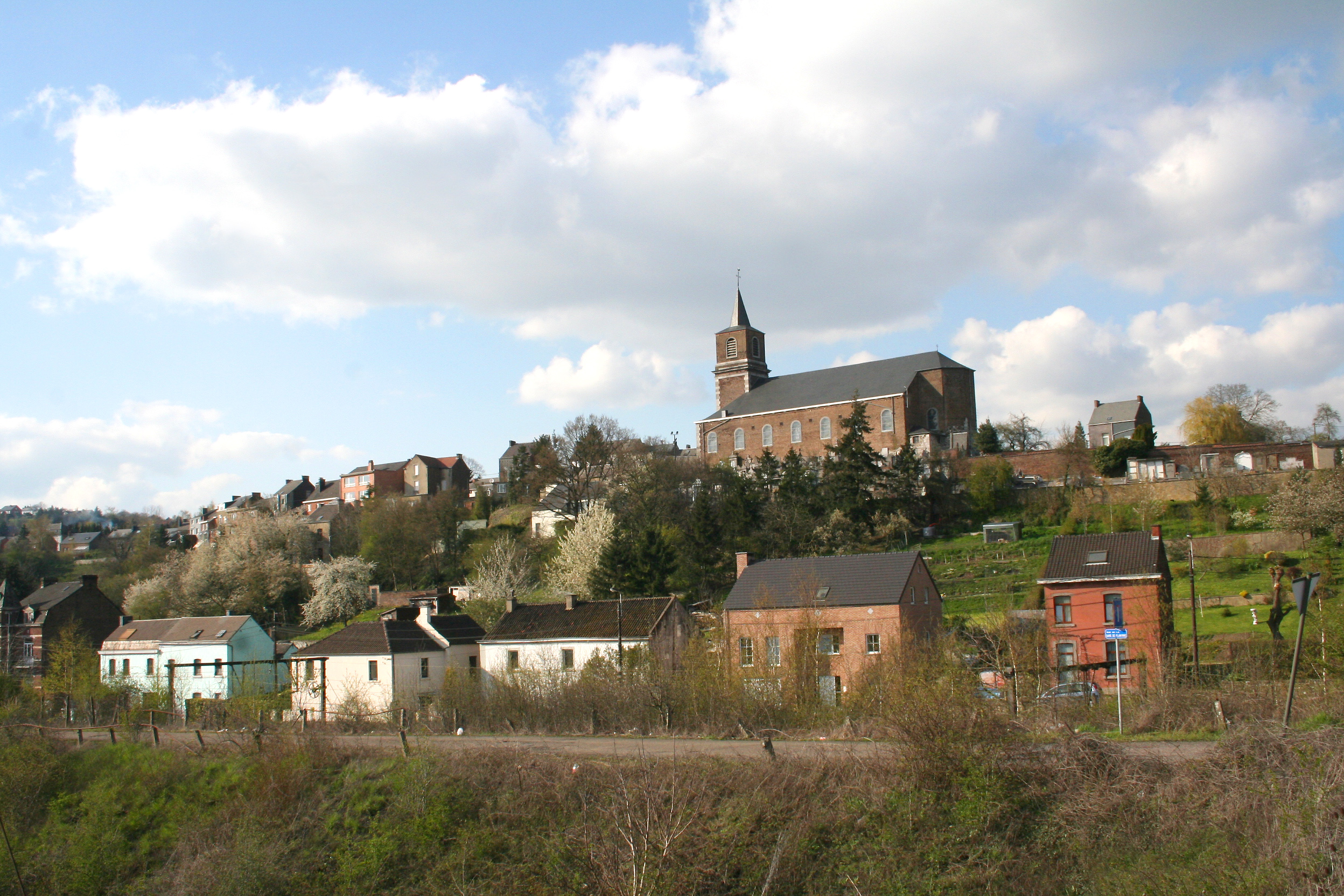

- Location of Flawinne in Namur
- Interactive map of Flawinne
- Location within Belgium Location within Namur Province
- Coordinates: 50°27′00″N 4°48′00″E
- Country: Belgium
- Community: French Community
- Region: Wallonia
- Province: Namur
- Arrondissement: Namur
- Municipality: Namur

Area
  - Total: 6.74 km^{2} (2.60 sq mi)

Population (2020-01-01)
  - Total: 4,625
  - Density: 686/km^{2} (1,780/sq mi)
- Postal codes: 5020
- Area codes: 081

Flawinne (French pronunciation: [flawin]; Walloon: Flawene) is a sub-municipality of the city of Namur located in the province of Namur, Wallonia, Belgium. It was a separate municipality until 1977. On 2 August 1897, Belgrade was detached from Flawinne. On 1 January 1977, Flawinne was merged into Namur.

== See also ==
- Château de Flawinne
- 2nd Commando Battalion
