= CTV News Channel =

CTV News Channel may refer to:

- CTV News Channel (Canadian TV channel), a Canadian news channel formerly known as CTV Newsnet
- CTV News Channel (Taiwanese TV channel), a news channel based in Taiwan
