= Hannapes =

- Commune
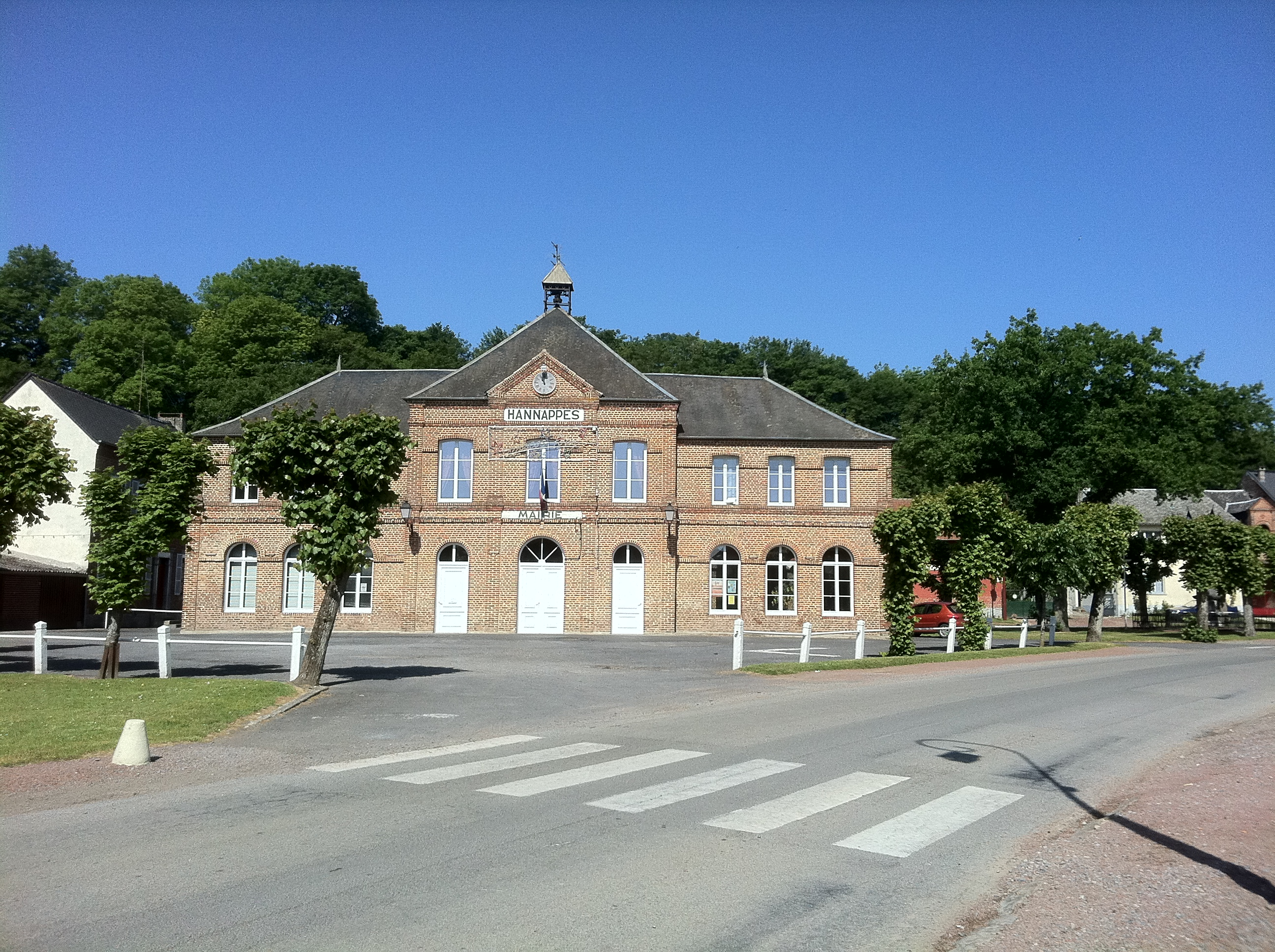
- The town hall of Hannapes
- Location of Hannapes
- Location within France Location within Hauts-de-France
- Coordinates: 49°58′22″N 3°37′34″E
- Country: France
- Region: Hauts-de-France
- Department: Aisne
- Arrondissement: Vervins
- Canton: Guise
- Intercommunality: Thiérache Sambre et Oise

Government
  - Mayor (2026–32): Christophe Ringenbach
- Area^{1}: 9.16 km^{2} (3.54 sq mi)
- Elevation: 177 m (581 ft)
- Highest elevation: 185 m (607 ft)
- Lowest elevation: 100 m (330 ft)
- Population (2023): 320
  - Density: 35/km^{2} (90/sq mi)
- Time zone: UTC+01:00 (CET)
  - Summer (DST): UTC+02:00 (CEST)
- INSEE/Postal code: 02366 /02510
- ^{1} French Land Register data, which excludes lakes, ponds, glaciers > 1 km^{2} (0.386 sq mi or 247 acres) and river estuaries.

Hannapes (French pronunciation: [anap]) is a commune in the Aisne department in Hauts-de-France in northern France.

== Population ==
Historical population
Year	Pop.	±% p.a.
1968	386	—
1975	359	−1.03%
1982	351	−0.32%
1990	272	−3.14%
1999	278	+0.24%
2007	267	−0.50%
2012	300	+2.36%
2017	318	+1.17%
2023	320	+0.10%
Source: INSEE

== See also ==
- Communes of the Aisne department
