= George Wilkes Unett =

George Wilkes Unett (1772–1825) was a British Royal Artillery officer who fought in the Napoleonic Wars.

== Biography ==
Unett was the fourth son of the Rev. Thomas Unett (1731–1785), rector of Coppenhall, in Cheshire, and prebendary of Lichfield Cathedral, and Frances Godwin, of Stafford.

George Unett followed the example of his elder brother, Richard, by entering the Royal Artillery, and rose to the rank of major. He was present at the taking of Copenhagen (1807), and in several engagements in the West Indies. He was at the Battle of Waterloo (1815), and afterwards on the advance on Paris at the capture of Cambrai. He was presented with the Waterloo Medal. He died in 1825.

== Family ==
In 1822, when he was about of 50 years old, he married Eliza Jones, the sister of Sir John Thomas Jones, of the Royal Engineers. They had a daughter Frances-Eliza (1824–1844).
