= Englefontaine =

- Commune
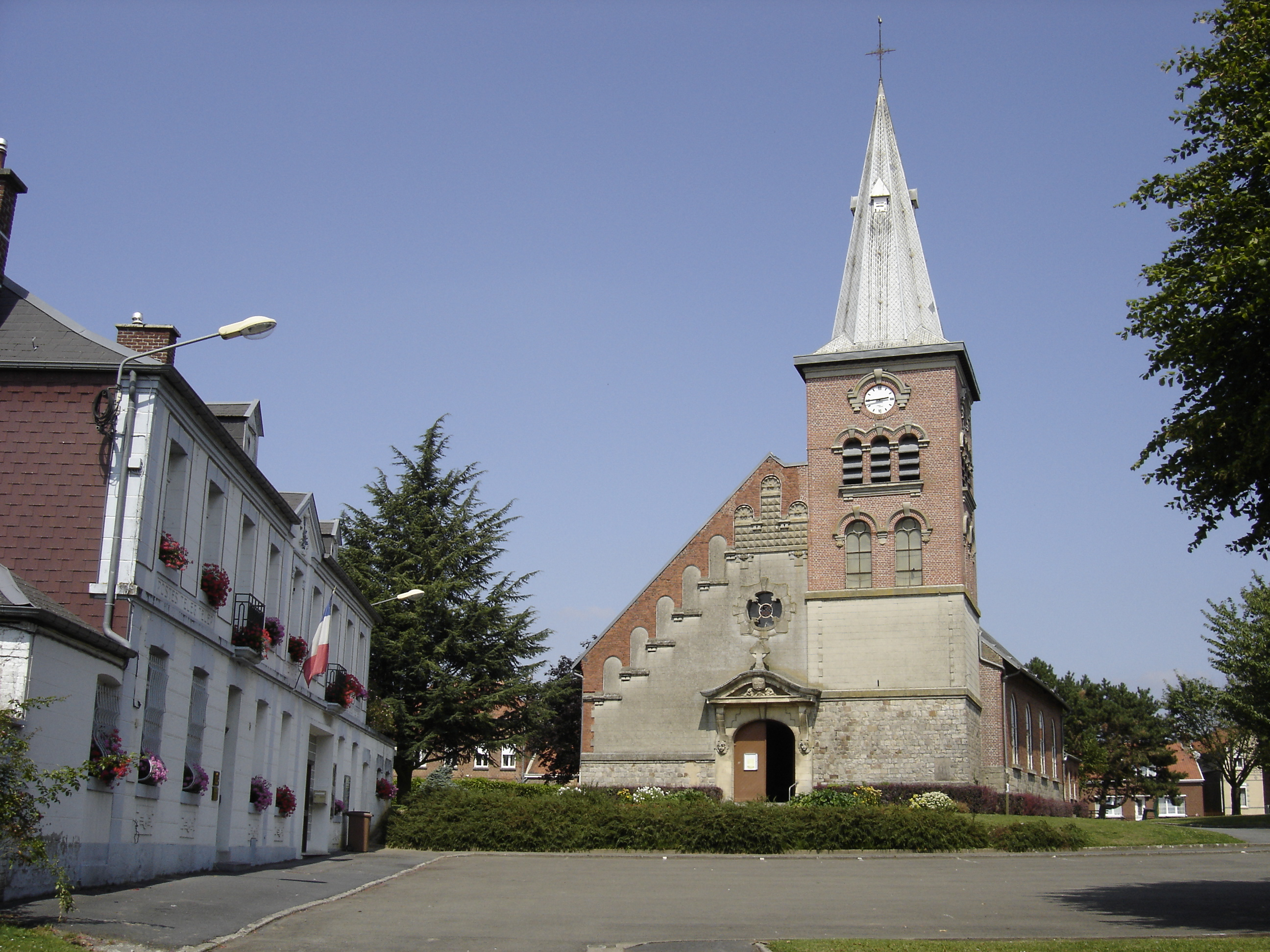
- The church in Englefontaine

- Coat of arms
- Location of Englefontaine
- Location within France Location within Hauts-de-France
- Coordinates: 50°11′32″N 3°38′37″E
- Country: France
- Region: Hauts-de-France
- Department: Nord
- Arrondissement: Avesnes-sur-Helpe
- Canton: Avesnes-sur-Helpe
- Intercommunality: CC Pays de Mormal

Government
  - Mayor (2020–2026): Sandra Pluchart
- Area^{1}: 4.62 km^{2} (1.78 sq mi)
- Elevation: 135 m (443 ft)
- Highest elevation: 152 m (499 ft)
- Lowest elevation: 128 m (420 ft)
- Population (2023): 1,291
  - Density: 279/km^{2} (724/sq mi)
- Time zone: UTC+01:00 (CET)
  - Summer (DST): UTC+02:00 (CEST)
- INSEE/Postal code: 59194 /59530
- ^{1} French Land Register data, which excludes lakes, ponds, glaciers > 1 km^{2} (0.386 sq mi or 247 acres) and river estuaries.

Englefontaine (French pronunciation: [ɑ̃ɡləfɔ̃tɛn]) is a commune in the Nord department in northern France.

== Heraldry ==
Arms of Englefontaine	The arms of Englefontaine are blazoned : Vair, 3 pales gules. (Englefontaine, Louvignies-Quesnoy, Poix-du-Nord and Saint-Waast-la-Vallée use the same arms.)

== See also ==
- Communes of the Nord department
