= Ferdinand Ernst Wilhelm August von Schmiedeberg =

Prussian general (1778–1824)

Major General Ferdinand Ernst Wilhelm August von Schmiedeberg (1778–1824) was a Prussian officer during the Napoleonic Wars.

== Biography ==
Schmiedeberg began his operational military career in 1806 as a second lieutenant in von Heising's Cuirassier Regiment (Cuirassiers Goertz (No. 8)) participating in the Polish campaign including the defence of Neisse (1806–1807) for which he received the Pour le Mérite. During this campaign he distinguished himself not only as brave but also as a capable officer. In July 1808 he was promoted to captain and placed on the staff of the army, In June 1809 he requested and received a military retirement, but he was seconded the Austrian army and remained with them until the end of the war.

He rejoined the Prussian in 1811 and in 1813 he joined the Silesian Ulanen Regiment and was appointed their commander in the next year. He fought in the Waterloo Campaign and after the death of von Thümen his immediate superior at the Battle of Ligny he was promoted to command the 1st Brigade of the II Corps Cavalry.

His health was ruined by the rigours of the campaigns and he retired from active service in 1821 being honoured with an awarded the Iron Cross 1st and 2nd Class a promotion to Major General and a pension. He died on 4 January 1824 at his family seat at Schurgast in Silesia.
