= The News Channel (Australian TV channel) =

Defunct Australian television channel

- Type: News channel
- Country: Australia
- Broadcast area: Australia

Programming
- Language: English
- Picture format: 4:3

Ownership
- Owner: Australian Information Media

History
- Launched: September 1995; 30 years ago
- Closed: September 1995; 30 years ago

The News Channel was an Australian channel operated by Australian Information Media (AIM) that aimed to become Australia's first national cable news channel. The service conducted tests in 1995 but ultimately shut down after missing a deadline that would enable its operation.

== History ==
Australian Information Media was a joint-venture between the Australian Broadcasting Corporation (51%) and a consortium of two private companies: American cable company Cox and Australian publishing company Fairfax Media. In February 1995, AIM planned the launch of two cable channels, The News Channel and a hybrid children and entertainment service which had a content agreement with Nickelodeon. This was partly aligned with Cox’s plan to build a cable network in Queensland, which ultimately never completed due to conflicts with Optus Vision.

Foxtel rejected a carriage agreement in July 1995 on quality grounds. The channel failed to secure an agreement with Optus Vision on 9 August 1995. The move was due to the creation of Sky News Australia, a joint venture between Kerry Packer of PBL and Rupert Murdoch. The company suspended operations on 28 September 1995. On the same day, both the opposition and the Australian Democrats expressed concern to the ruling government's policy for pay television and the disbanding of AIM. Ultimately on 6 October, due to the lack of satellite distribution, its 109 staff were sacked.
