= Joseph François Noos =

French military officer (1766–1826)

Joseph François Noos, Baron of the Empire (11 December 1766 in Bruges – 25 August 1826 in Calais) was an officer in the army of the French Republican and fought thought the French Revolutionary Wars and the Napoleonic Wars. (Note: Noos was governor of the fortress and town of Cambrai in 1815. The town was stormed by the British during their advance on Paris after the Battle of Waterloo. In a contemporary letter about the Cambrai Baron Noos is misnamed Baron Roos, and this misspelling is perpetuated in some British histories about the storming of Cambrai town and the negotiations for the surrender or the citadel.)

== See also ==
- Nobility of the First French Empire

== Bibliography ==
- Pouvesle, Frederic (December 2013), "Noos Joseph", Empire Histofig - Le site de jeu d'histoire, archived from the original on March 28, 2014
