= Names inscribed on the Arc de Triomphe =

The following is a list of the 660 names inscribed on the Arc de Triomphe in Paris. Most of them represent generals who served during the French First Republic (1792–1804) and the First French Empire (1804–1815). Underlined names signify those killed in action. Additionally, the names of specific armies are listed, grouped together by the four compass facades of the arch: North (northern France, lower Rhine, Netherlands), East (Central Europe, Switzerland, Italy), South (Mediterranean Europe, Egypt, southern France) and West (Pyrenees, western France, notable units).

Related list: Battles inscribed on the Arc de Triomphe.

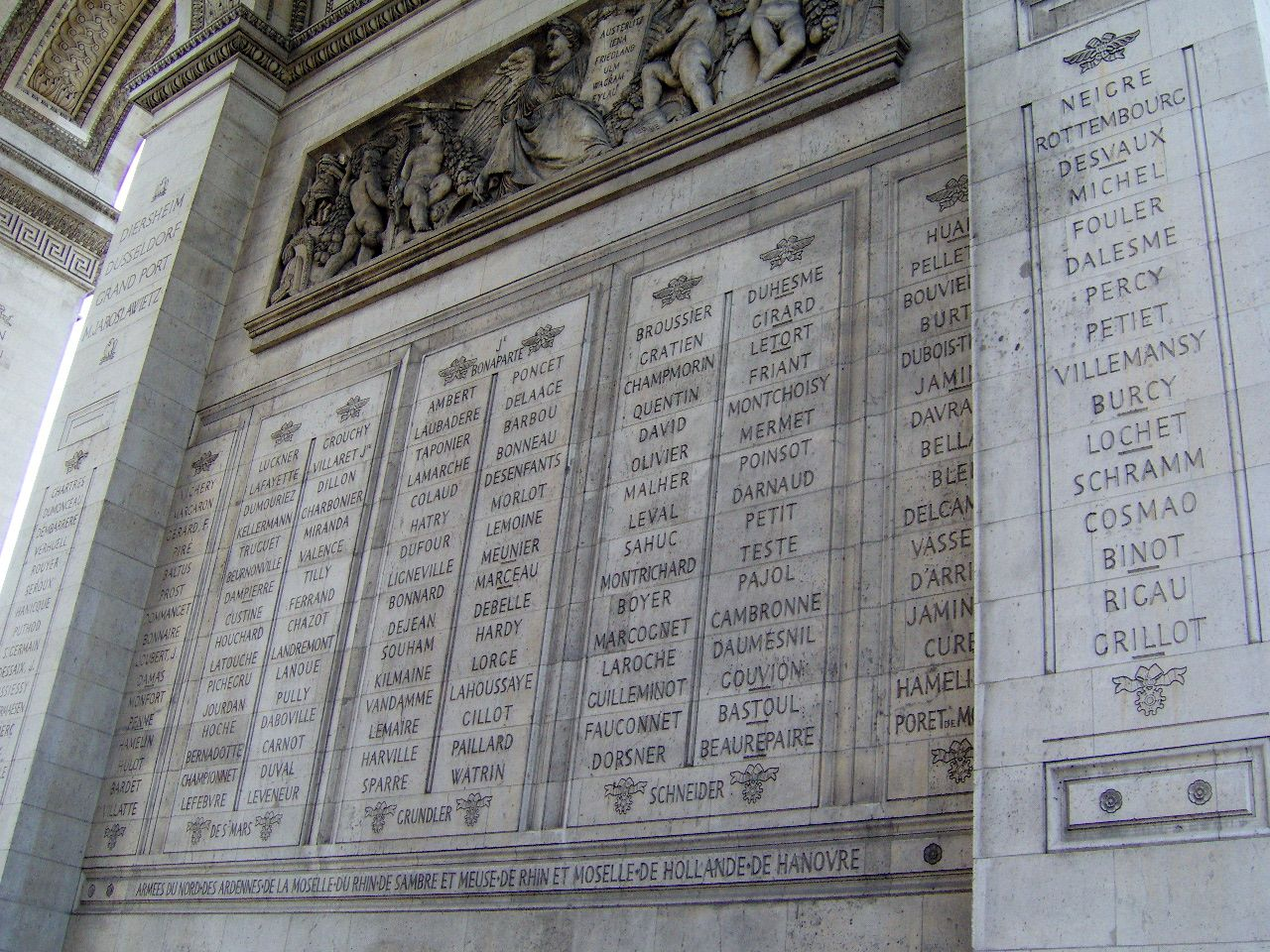
Northern pillar
Armies of northern France, the lower Rhine and the Netherlands.

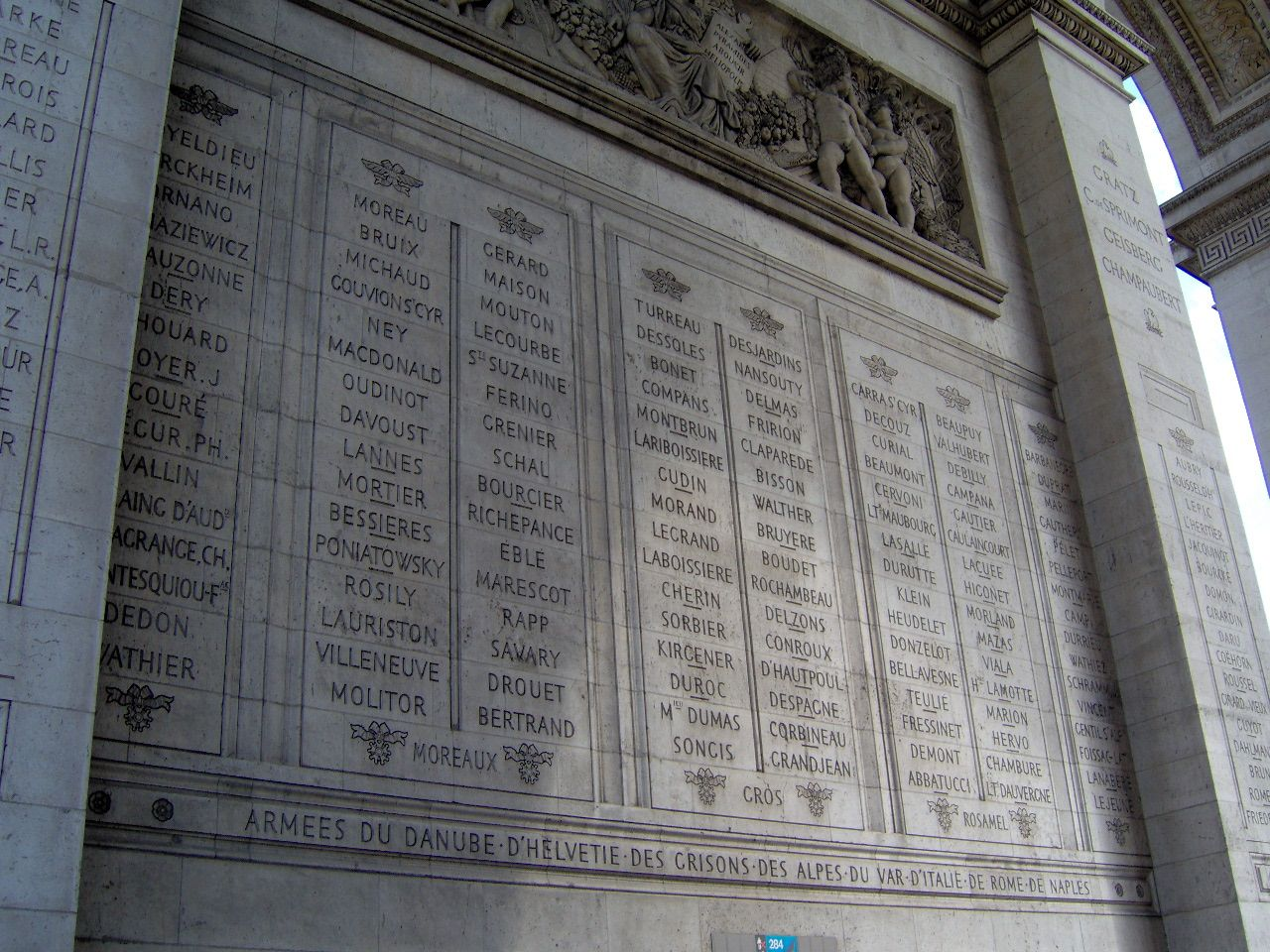
Eastern pillar
Armies of Central Europe, Switzerland and Italy.

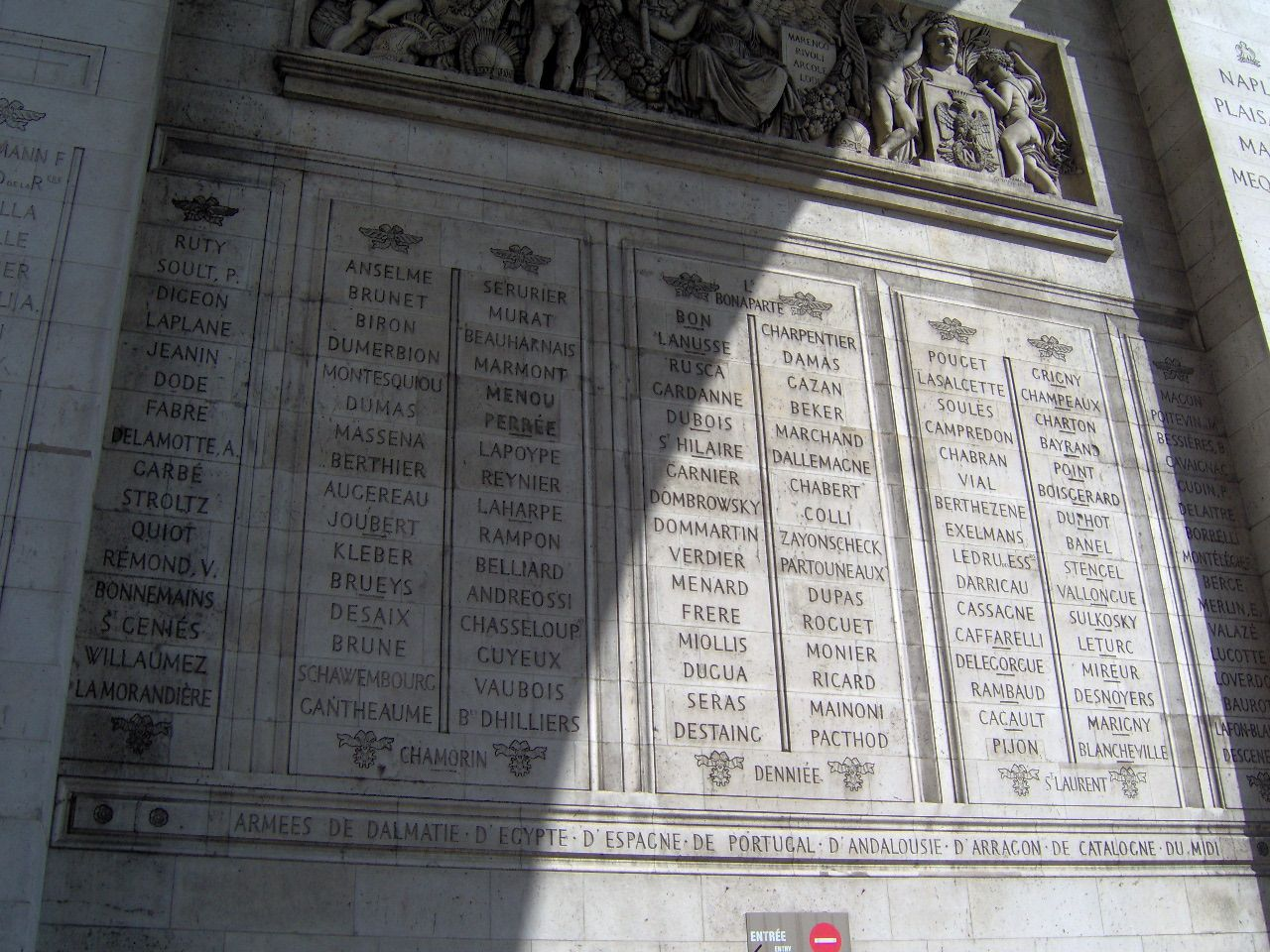
Southern pillar
Armies of Mediterranean Europe, Egypt and southern France.

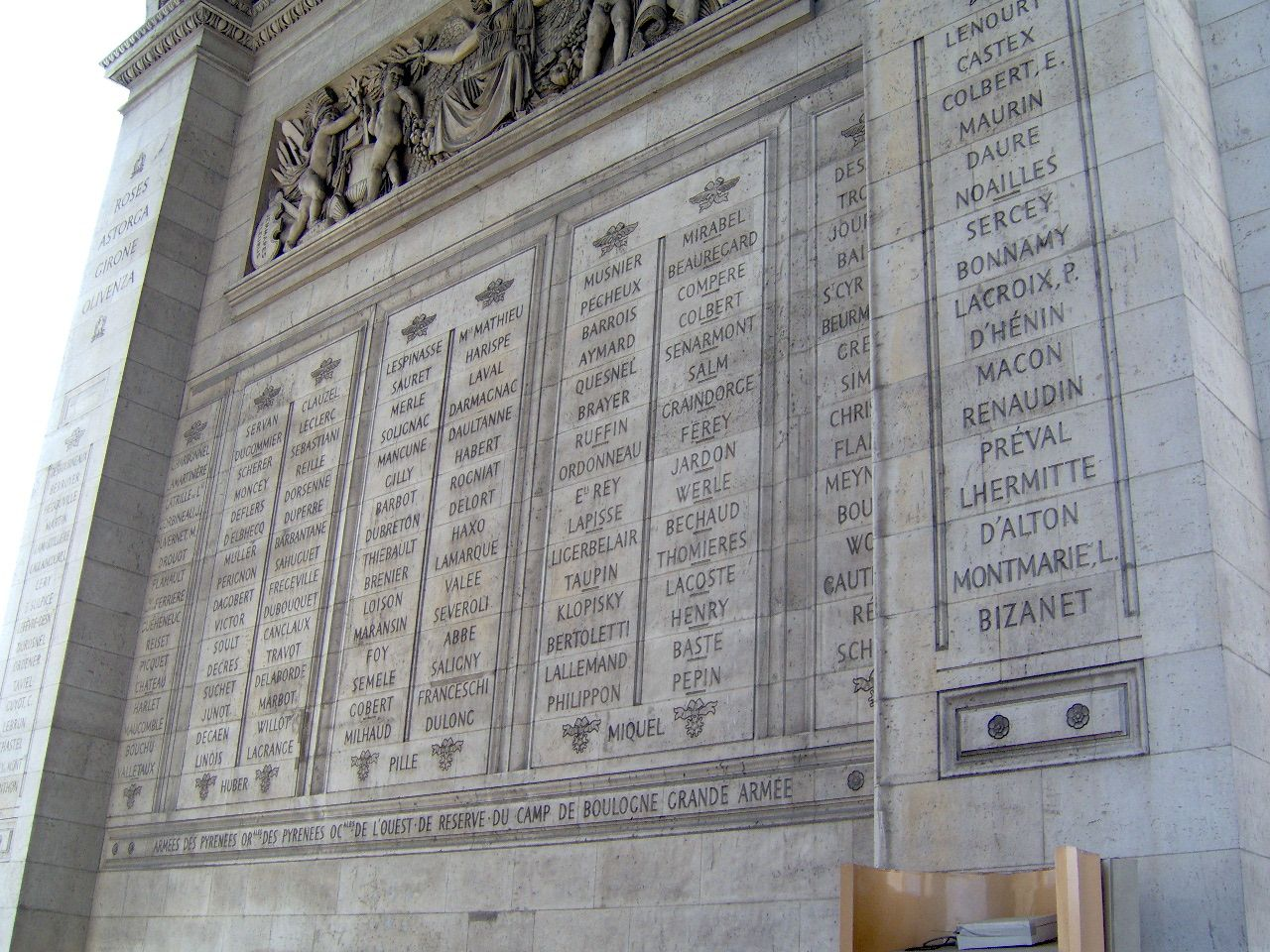
Western pillar
Armies of the Pyrenees, western France and notable units.

== Northern pillar ==
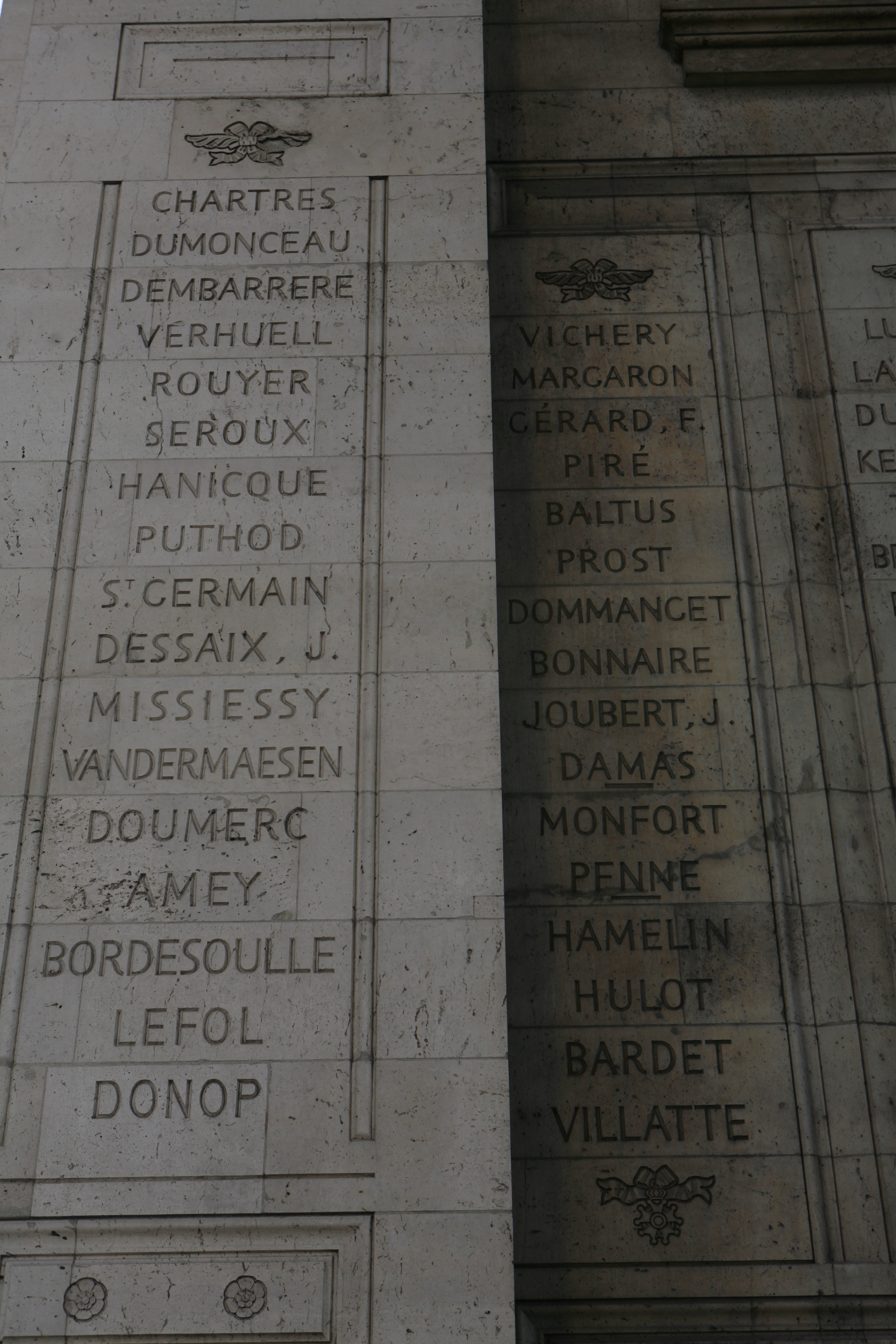
Columns 1, 2.

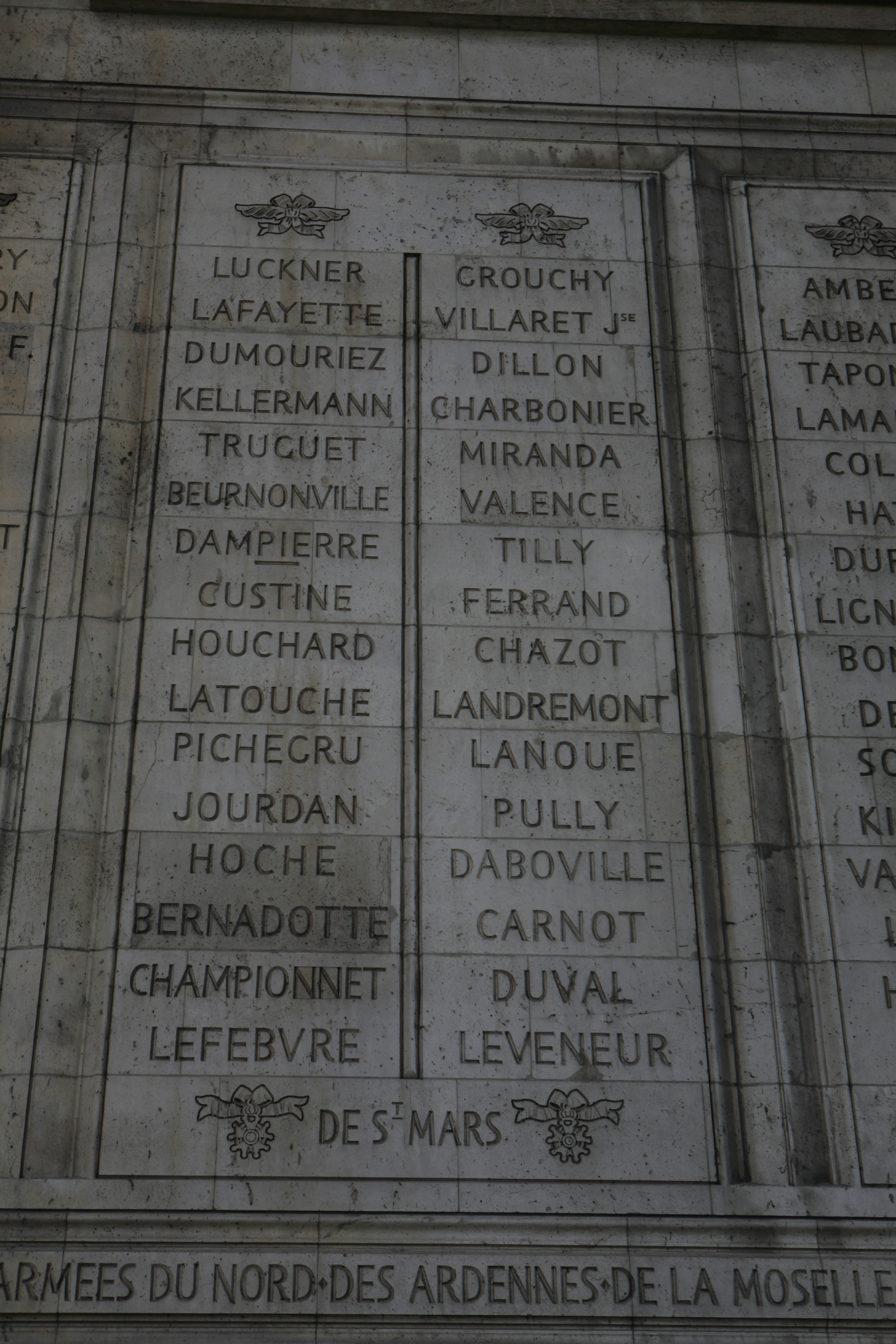
Columns 3, 4.

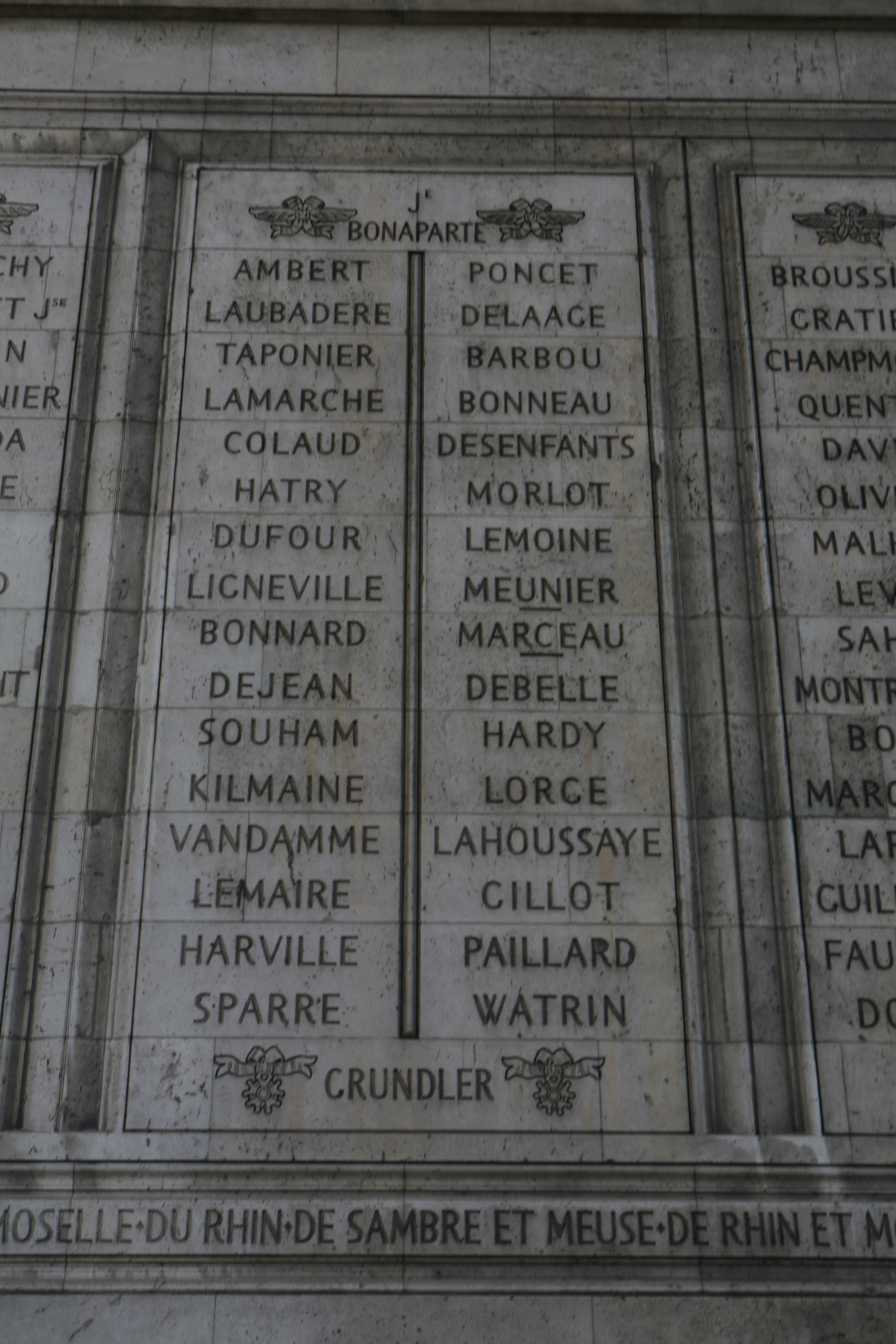
Columns 5, 6.

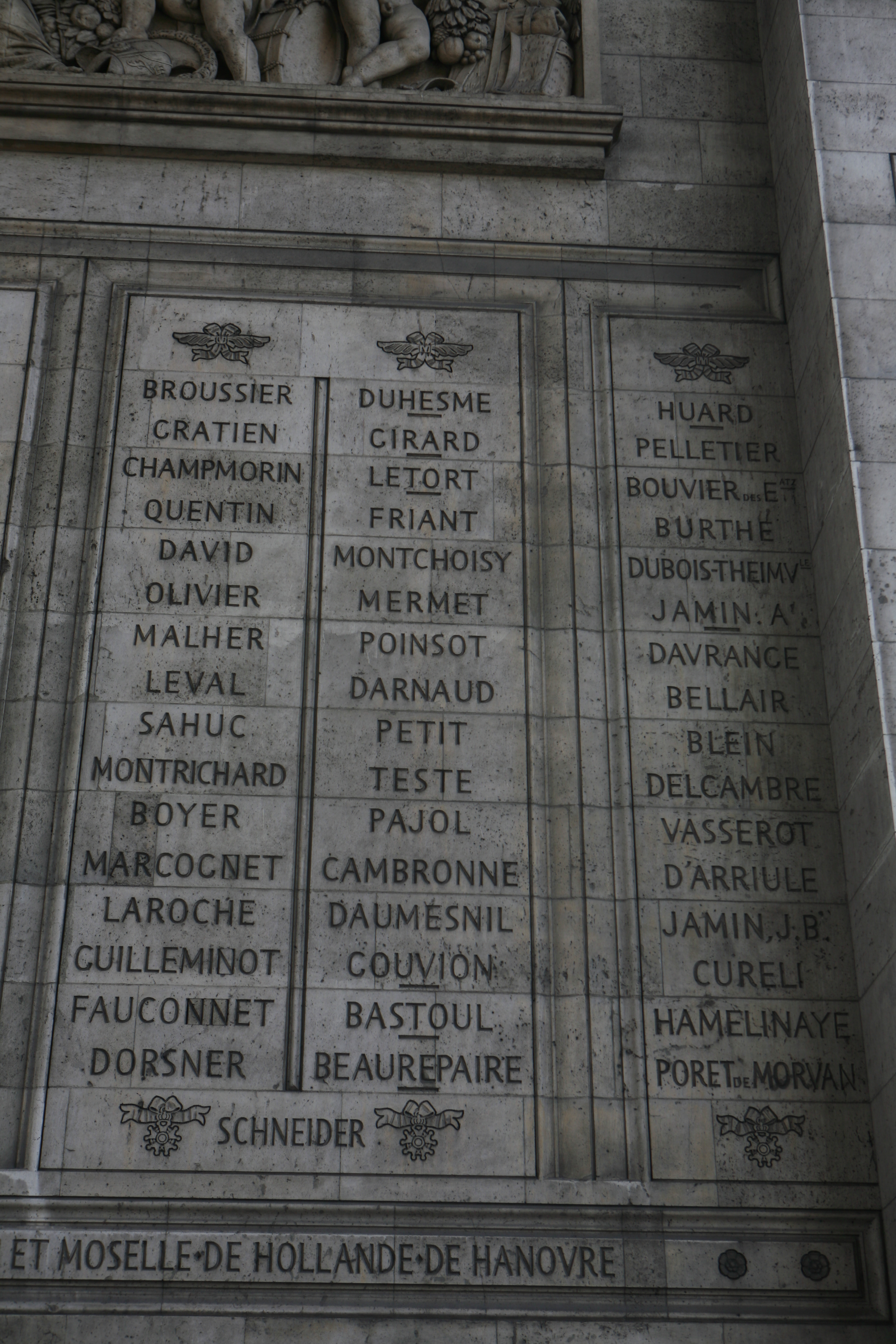
Columns 7, 8, 9.

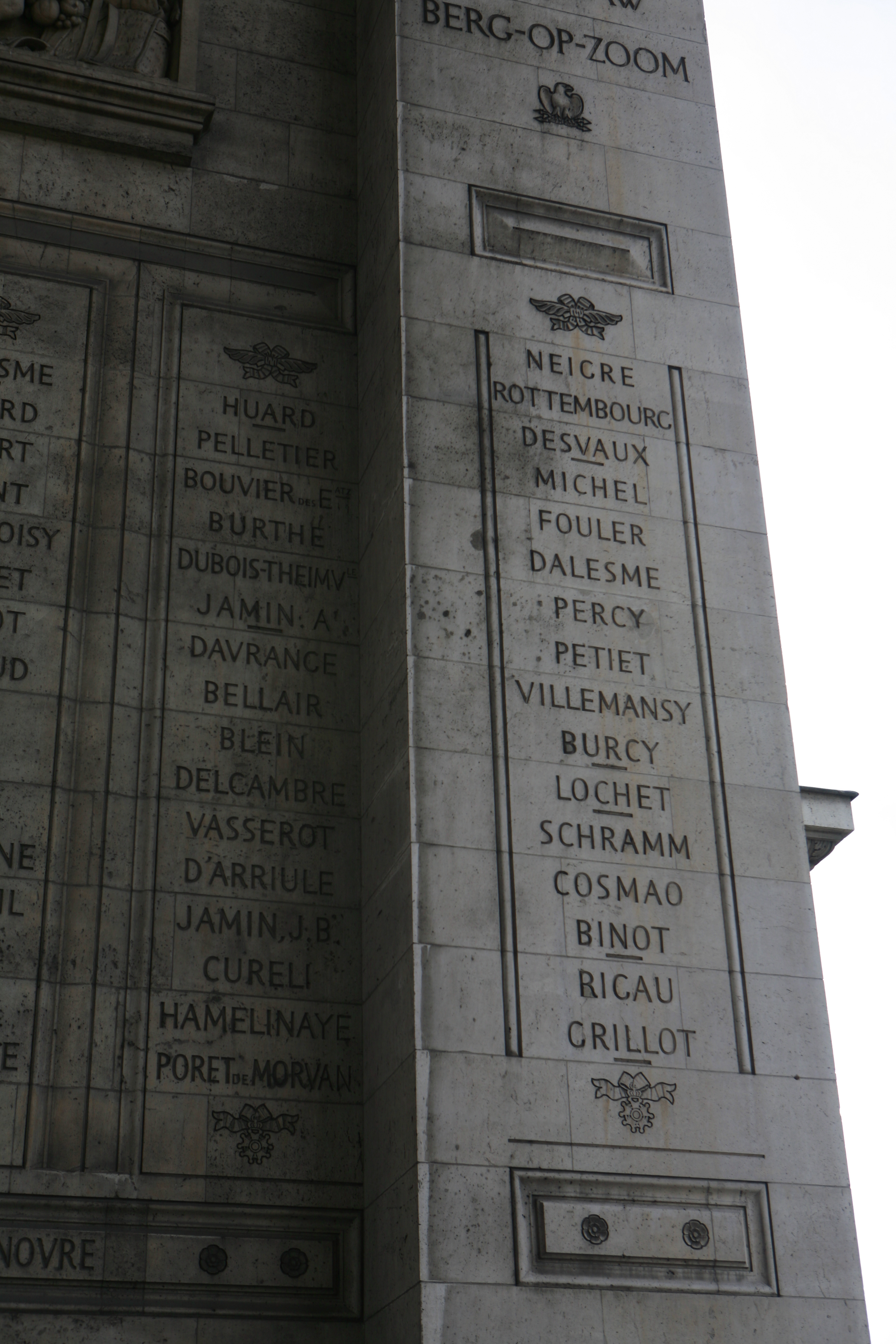
Columns 9, 10.
The 165 names inscribed on the northern pillar (Avenue de la Grande Armée / Avenue de Wagram)

Column 1	Column 2	Column 3	Column 4	Column 5	Column 6	Column 7	Column 8	Column 9	Column 10
•	•	•	•	J^{E} BONAPARTE	•	•	•	•	•
CHARTRES	VICHERY	LUCKNER	GROUCHY	AMBERT	PONCET	BROUSSIER	DUHESME	HUARD	NEIGRE
DUMONCEAU	MARGARON	LAFAYETTE	VILLARET J^{SE}	LAUBADERE	DELAAGE	GRATIEN	GIRARD	PELLETIER	ROTTEMBOURG
DEMBARRERE	GÉRARD, F.	DUMOURIEZ	DILLON	TAPONIER	BARBOU	CHAMPMORIN	LETORT	BOUVIER DES E^{ATZ}	DESVAUX
VERHUELL	PIRÉ	KELLERMANN	CHARBONIER	LAMARCHE	BONNEAU	QUENTIN	FRIANT	BURTHE	MICHEL
ROUYER	BALTUS	TRUGUET	MIRANDA	COLAUD	DESENFANTS	DAVID	MONTCHOISY	DUBOIS-THEIMV^{LE}	FOULER
SEROUX	PROST	BEURNONVILLE	VALENCE	HATRY	MORLOT	OLIVIER	MERMET	JAMIN, A.	DALESME
HANICQUE	DOMMANGET	DAMPIERRE	TILLY	DUFOUR	LEMOINE	MALHER	POINSOT	DAVRANGE	PERCY
PUTHOD	BONNAIRE	CUSTINE	FERRAND	LIGNEVILLE	MEUNIER	LEVAL	DARNAUD	BELLAIR	PETIET
S^{T} GERMAIN	JOUBERT, J.	HOUCHARD	CHAZOT	BONNARD	MARCEAU	SAHUC	PETIT	BLEIN	VILLEMANSY
DESSAIX, J.	DAMAS	LATOUCHE	LANDREMONT	DEJEAN	DEBELLE	MONTRICHARD	TESTE	DELCAMBRE	BURCY
MISSIESSY	MONFORT	PICHEGRU	LANOUE	SOUHAM	HARDY	BOYER	PAJOL	VASSEROT	LOCHET
VANDERMAESEN	PENNE	JOURDAN	PULLY	KILMAINE	LORGE	MARCOGNET	CAMBRONNE	D'ARRIULE	SCHRAMM
DOUMERC	HAMELIN	HOCHE	DABOVILLE	VANDAMME	LAHOUSSAYE	LAROCHE	DAUMESNIL	JAMIN, J.B.	COSMAO
AMEY	HULOT	BERNADOTTE	CARNOT	LEMAIRE	GILOT	GUILLEMINOT	GOUVION	CURELI	BINOT
BORDESOULLE	BARDET	CHAMPIONNET	DUVAL	HARVILLE	PAILLARD	FAUCONNET	BASTOUL	HAMELINAYE	RIGAU
LEFOL	VILLATTE	LEFEBVRE	LEVENEUR	SPARRE	WATRIN	DORSNER	BEAUREPAIRE	PORET DE MORVAN	GRILLOT
DONOP	•	DE S^{T} MARS	•	GRUNDLER	•	SCHNEIDER	•	•	•

ARMEES DU NORD ・ DES ARDENNES ・ DE LA MOSELLE ・ DU RHIN ・ DE SAMBRE ET MEUSE ・ DE RHIN ET MOSELLE ・ DE HOLLANDE ・ DE HANOVRE

== Eastern pillar ==
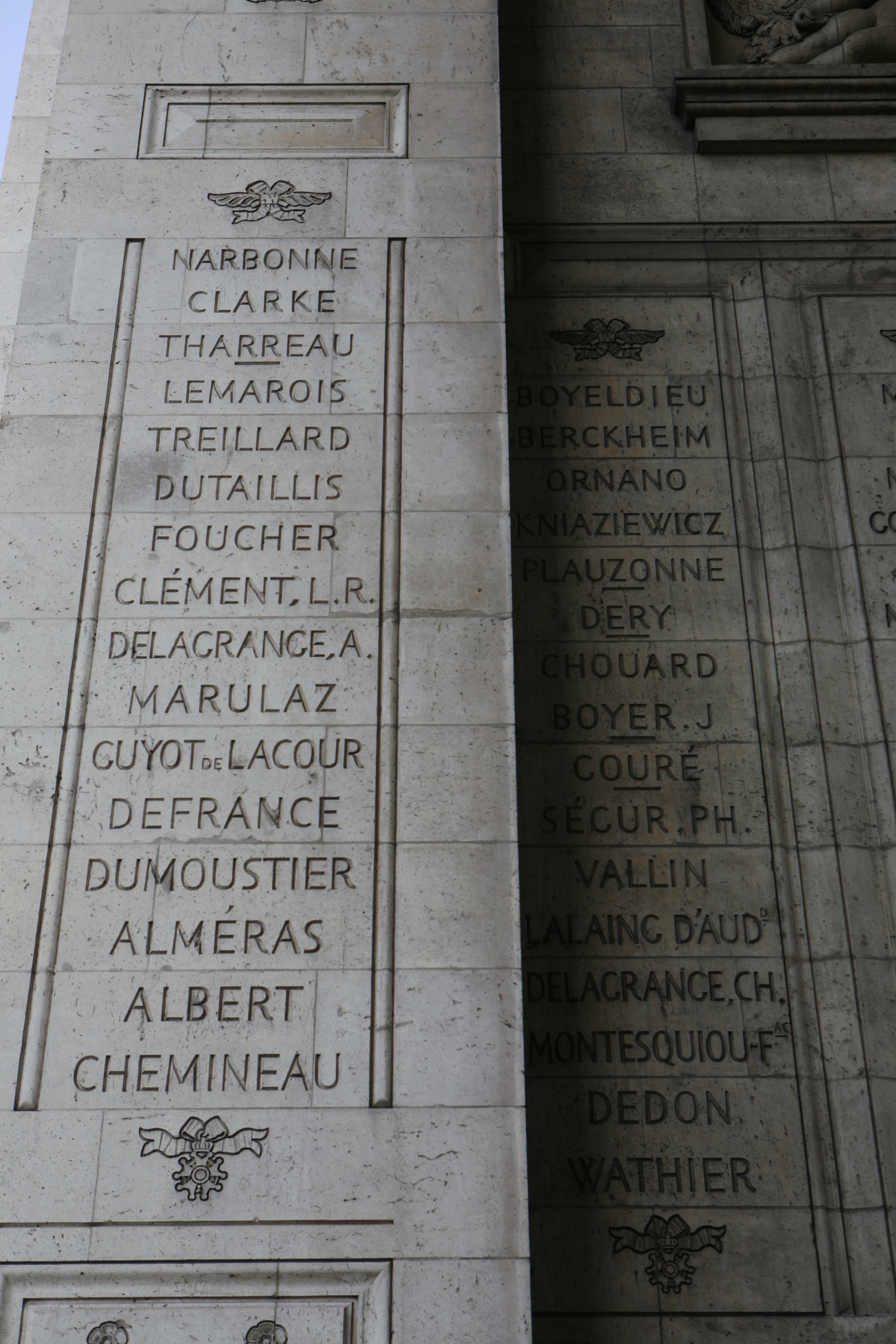
Columns 11, 12.

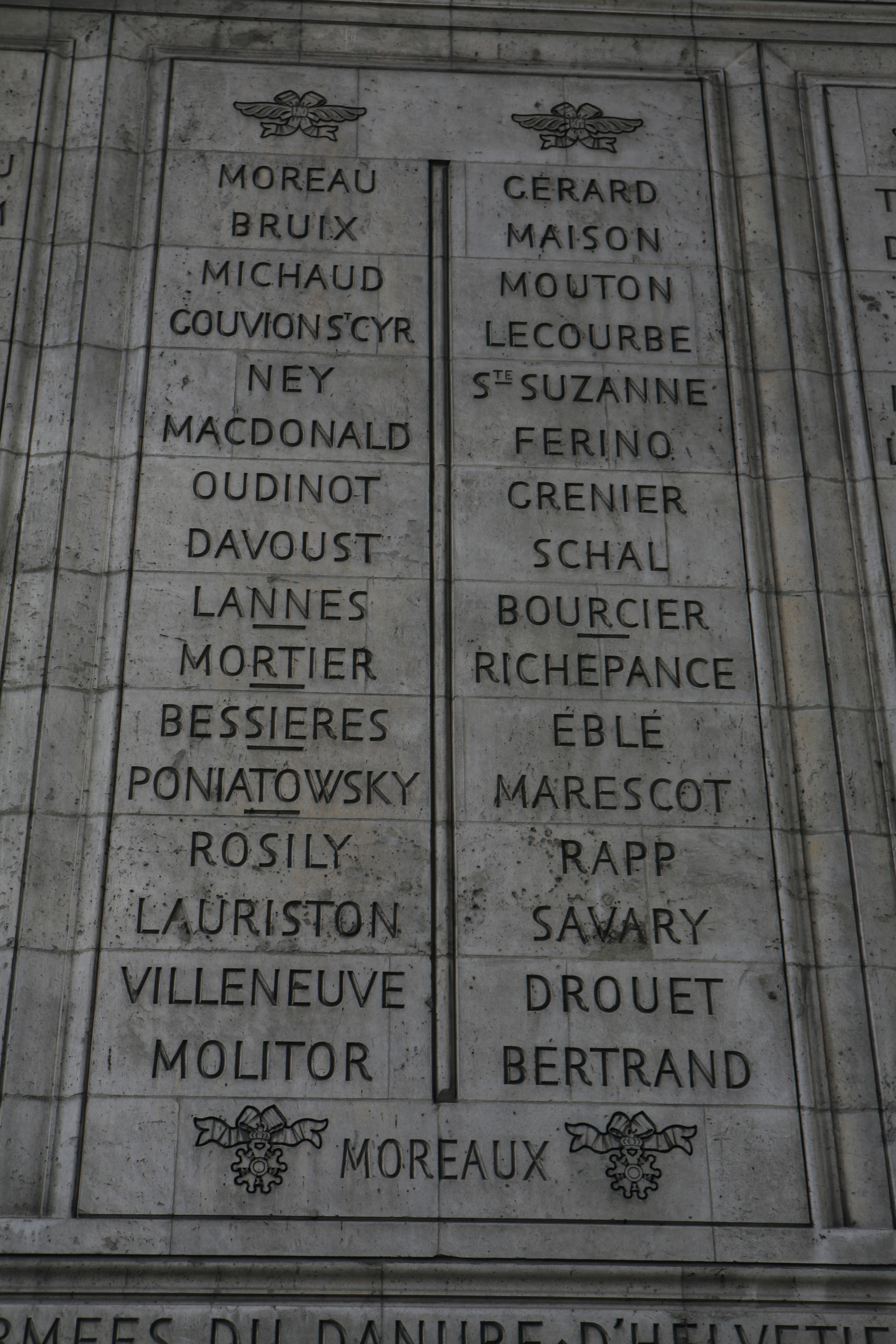
Columns 13, 14.

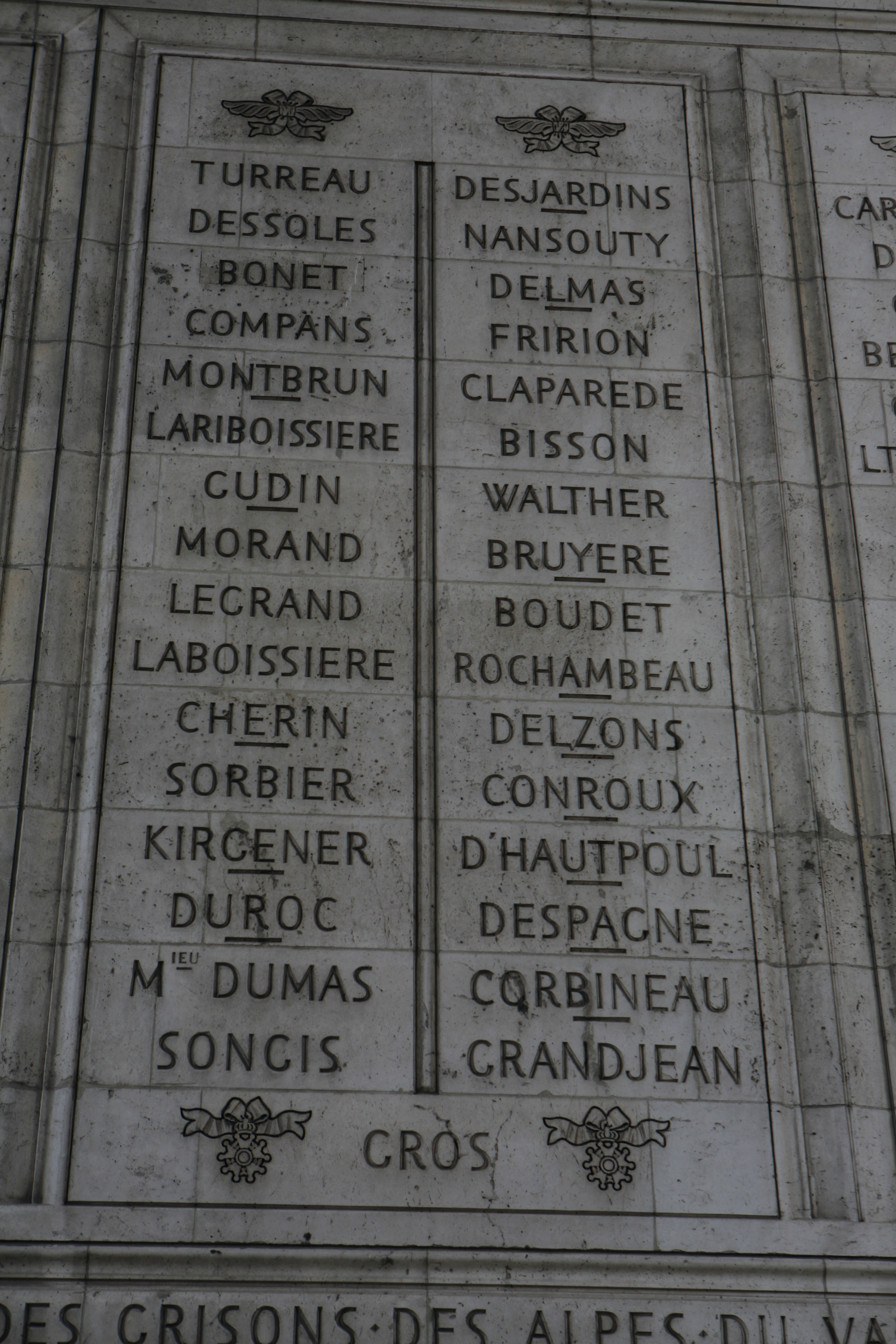
Columns 15, 16.

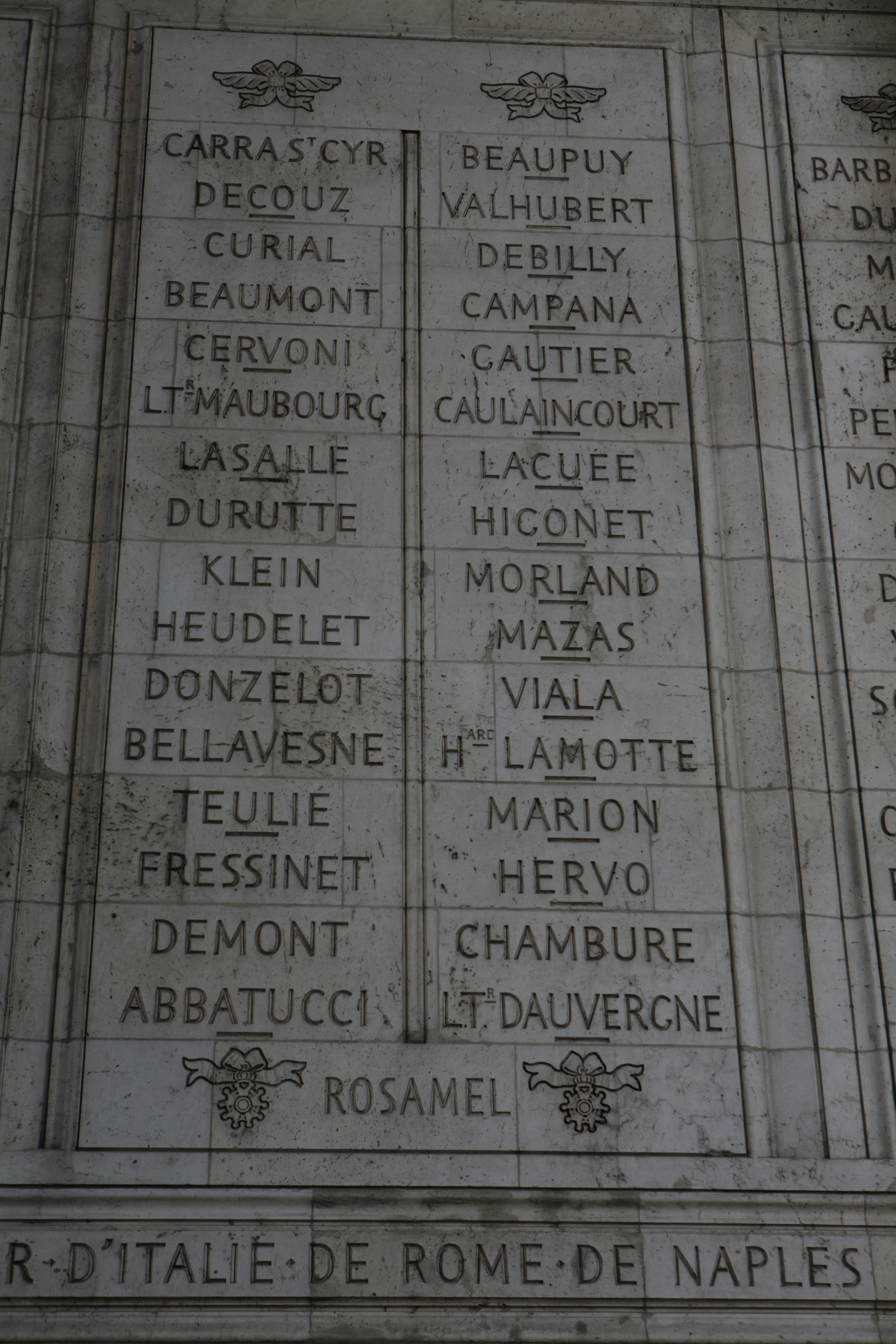
Columns 17, 18.

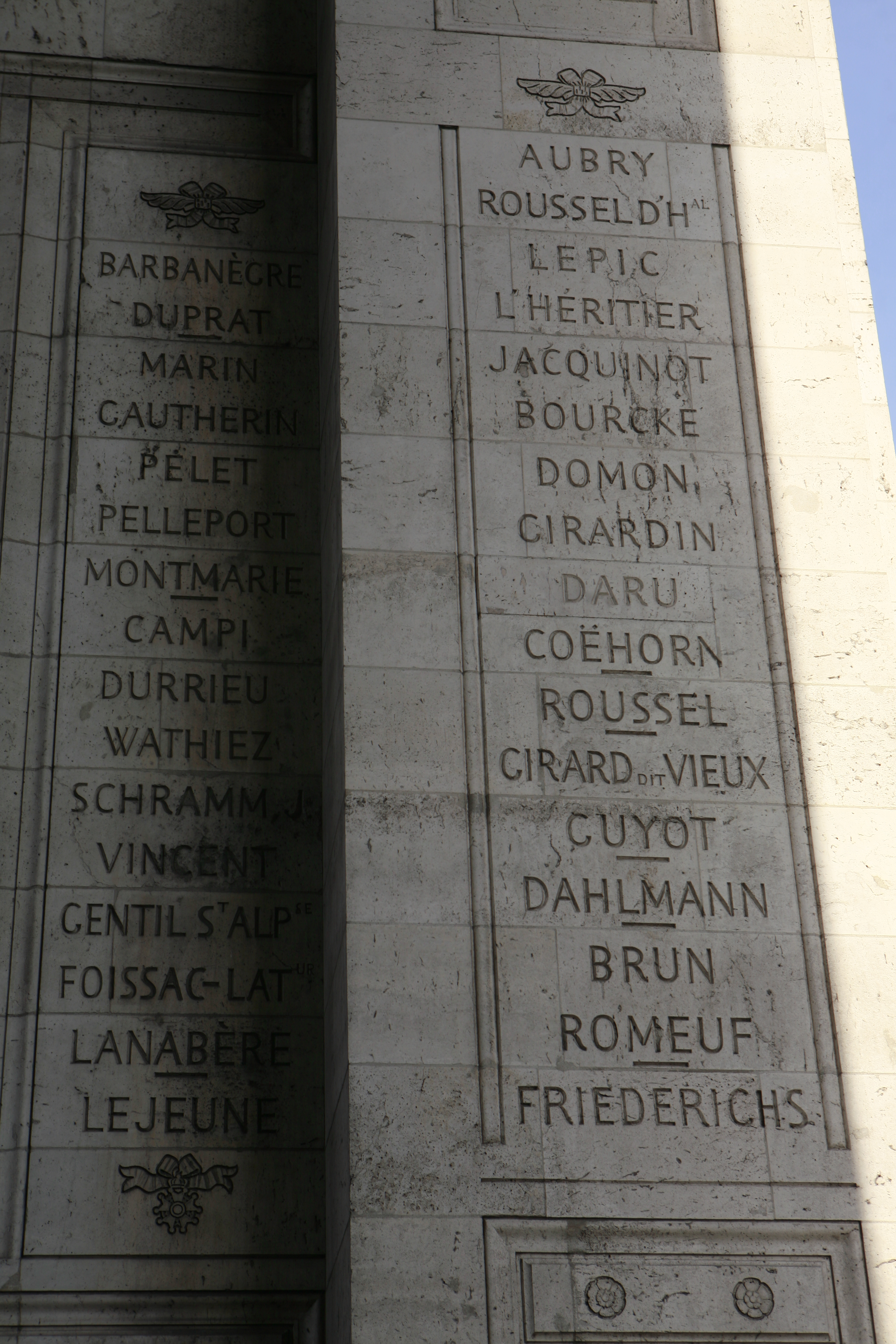
Columns 19, 20.
The 164 names inscribed on the eastern pillar (Avenue des Champs-Élysées / Avenue de Wagram)

Column 11	Column 12	Column 13	Column 14	Column 15	Column 16	Column 17	Column 18	Column 19	Column 20
•	•	•	•	•	•	•	•	•	•
NARBONNE	BOYELDIEU	MOREAU	GERARD	TURREAU	DESJARDINS	CARRA S^{T} CYR	BEAUPUY	BARBANÈGRE	AUBRY
CLARKE	BERCKHEIM	BRUIX	MAISON	DESSOLES	NANSOUTY	DECOUZ	VALHUBERT	DUPRAT	ROUSSEL D'H^{AL}
THARREAU	ORNANO	MICHAUD	MOUTON	BONET	DELMAS	CURIAL	DEBILLY	MARIN	LEPIC
LEMAROIS	KNIAZIEWICZ	GOUVION S^{T} CYR	LECOURBE	COMPANS	FRIRION	BEAUMONT	CAMPANA	GAUTHERIN	L'HÉRITIER
TREILLARD	PLAUZONNE	NEY	S^{TE} SUZANNE	MONTBRUN	CLAPAREDE	CERVONI	GAUTIER	PELET	JACQUINOT
DUTAILLIS	DERY	MACDONALD	FERINO	LARIBOISSIERE	BISSON	L.T^{R} MAUBOURG	CAULAINCOURT	PELLEPORT	BOURCKE
FOUCHER	CHOUARD	OUDINOT	GRENIER	GUDIN	WALTHER	LASALLE	LACUÉE	MONTMARIE	DOMON
CLÉMENT, L.R.	BOYER, J.	DAVOUST	SCHAAL	MORAND	BRUYERE	DURUTTE	HIGONET	CAMPI	GIRARDIN
DELAGRANGE, A.	GOURÉ	LANNES	BOURCIER	LEGRAND	BOUDET	KLEIN	MORLAND	DURRIEU	DARU
MARULAZ	SÉGUR, PH.	MORTIER	RICHEPANCE	LABOISSIERE	ROCHAMBEAU	HEUDELET	MAZAS	WATHIEZ	COËHORN
GUYOT DE LACOUR	VALLIN	BESSIERES	ÉBLÉ	CHERIN	DELZONS	DONZELOT	VIALA	SCHRAMM, J.	ROUSSEL
DEFRANCE	LALAING D'AUD^{DE}	PONIATOWSKY	MARESCOT	SORBIER	CONROUX	BELLAVESNE	H^{ARD} LAMOTTE	VINCENT	GIRARD DIT VIEUX
DUMOUSTIER	DELAGRANGE, CH.	ROSILY	RAPP	KIRGENER	D'HAUTPOUL	TEULIÉ	MARION	GENTIL S^{T} ALP^{SE}	GUYOT
ALMÉRAS	MONTESQUIOU-F^{AC}	LAURISTON	SAVARY	DUROC	DESPAGNE	FRESSINET	HERVO	FOISSAC-LAT^{UR}	DAHLMANN
ALBERT	DEDON	VILLENEUVE	DROUET	M^{IEU} DUMAS	CORBINEAU	DEMONT	CHAMBURE	LANABÈRE	BRUN
CHEMINEAU	WATHIER	MOLITOR	BERTRAND	SONGIS	GRANDJEAN	ABBATUCCI	L.T^{R} DAUVERGNE	LEJEUNE	ROMEUF
•	•	MOREAUX	•	GROS	•	ROSAMEL	•	•	FRIEDERICHS

ARMEES DU DANUBE ・ D'HELVETIE ・ DES GRISONS ・ DES ALPES ・ DU VAR ・ D'ITALIE ・ DE ROME ・ DE NAPLES

== Southern pillar ==
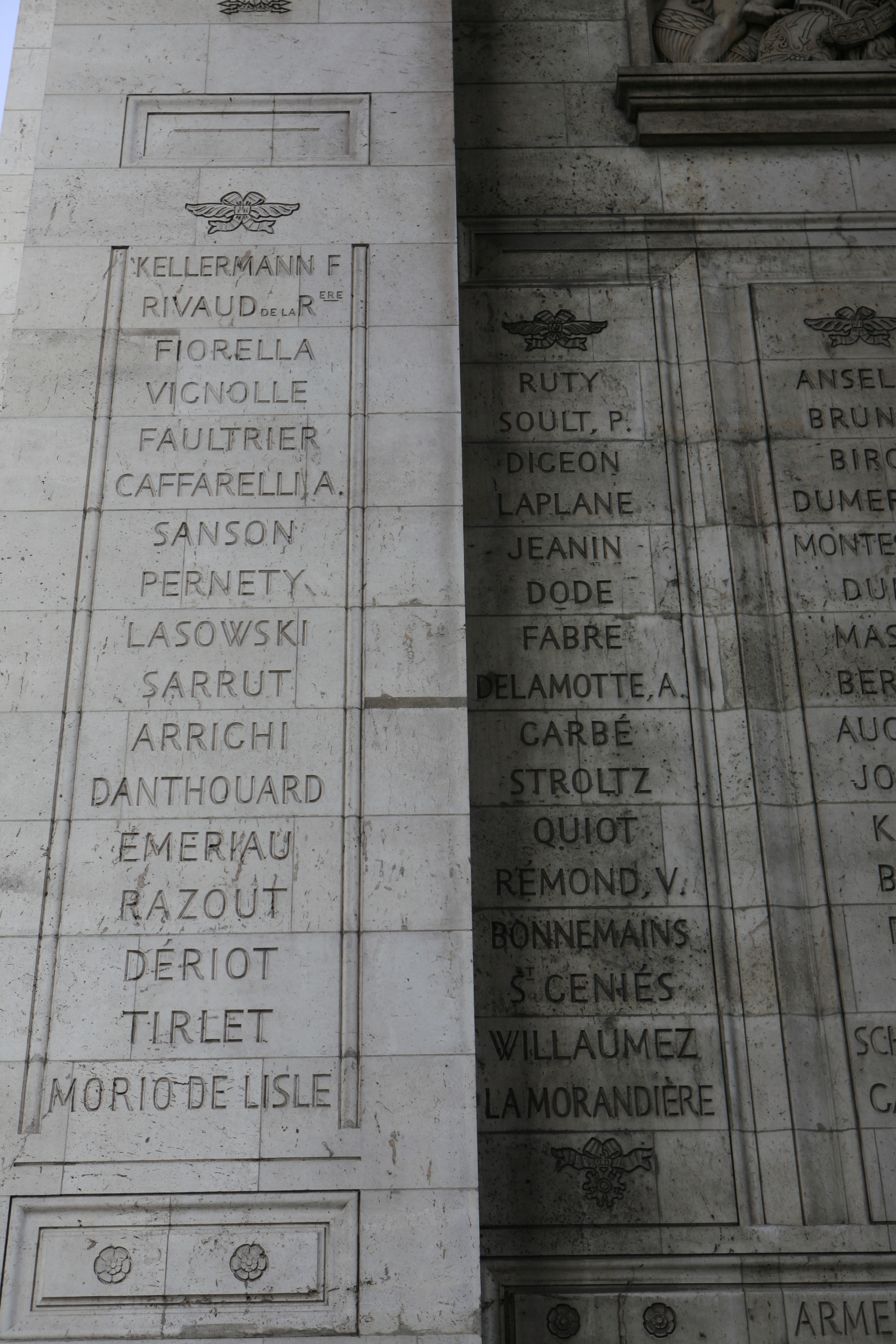
Columns 21, 22.

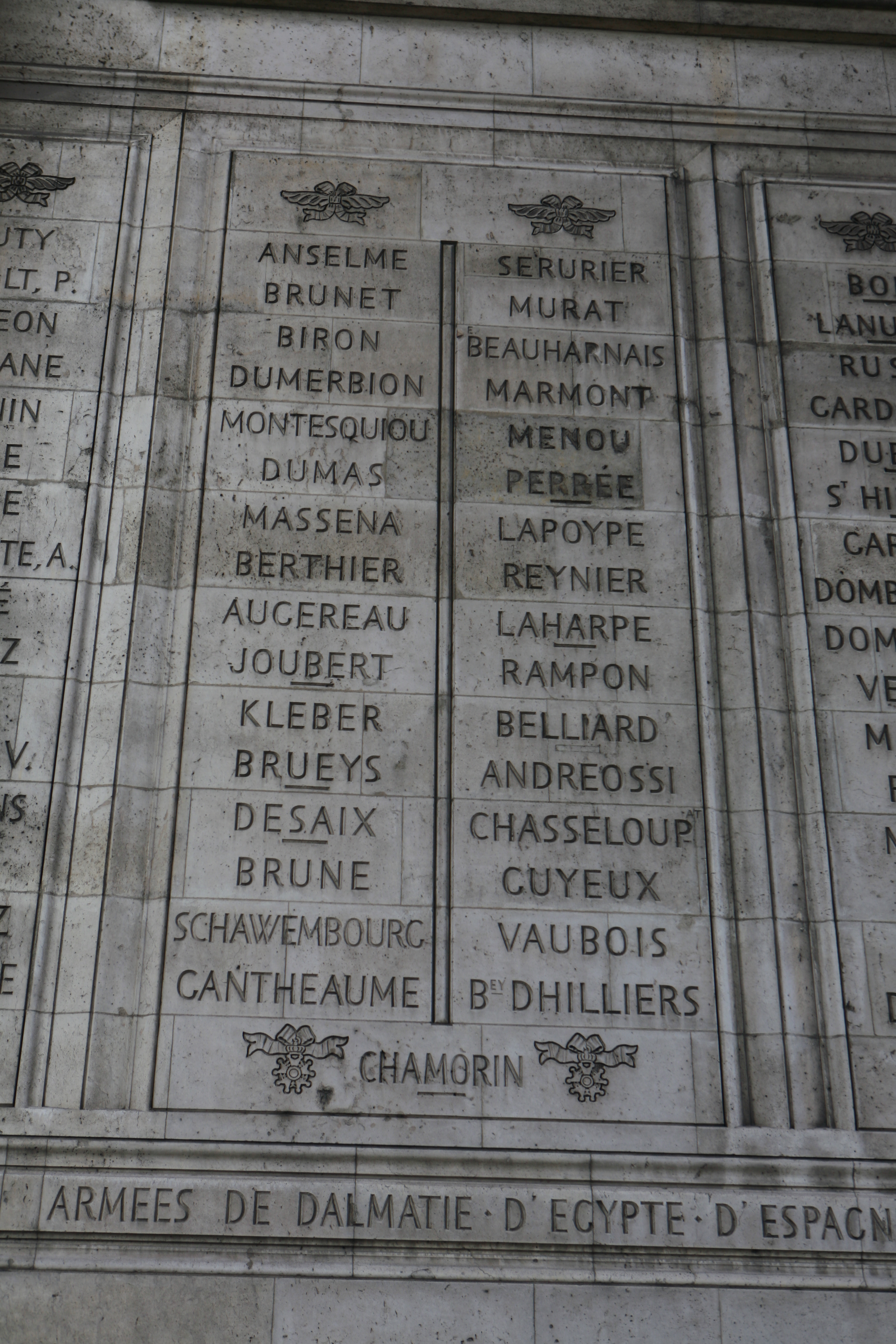
Columns 23, 24.

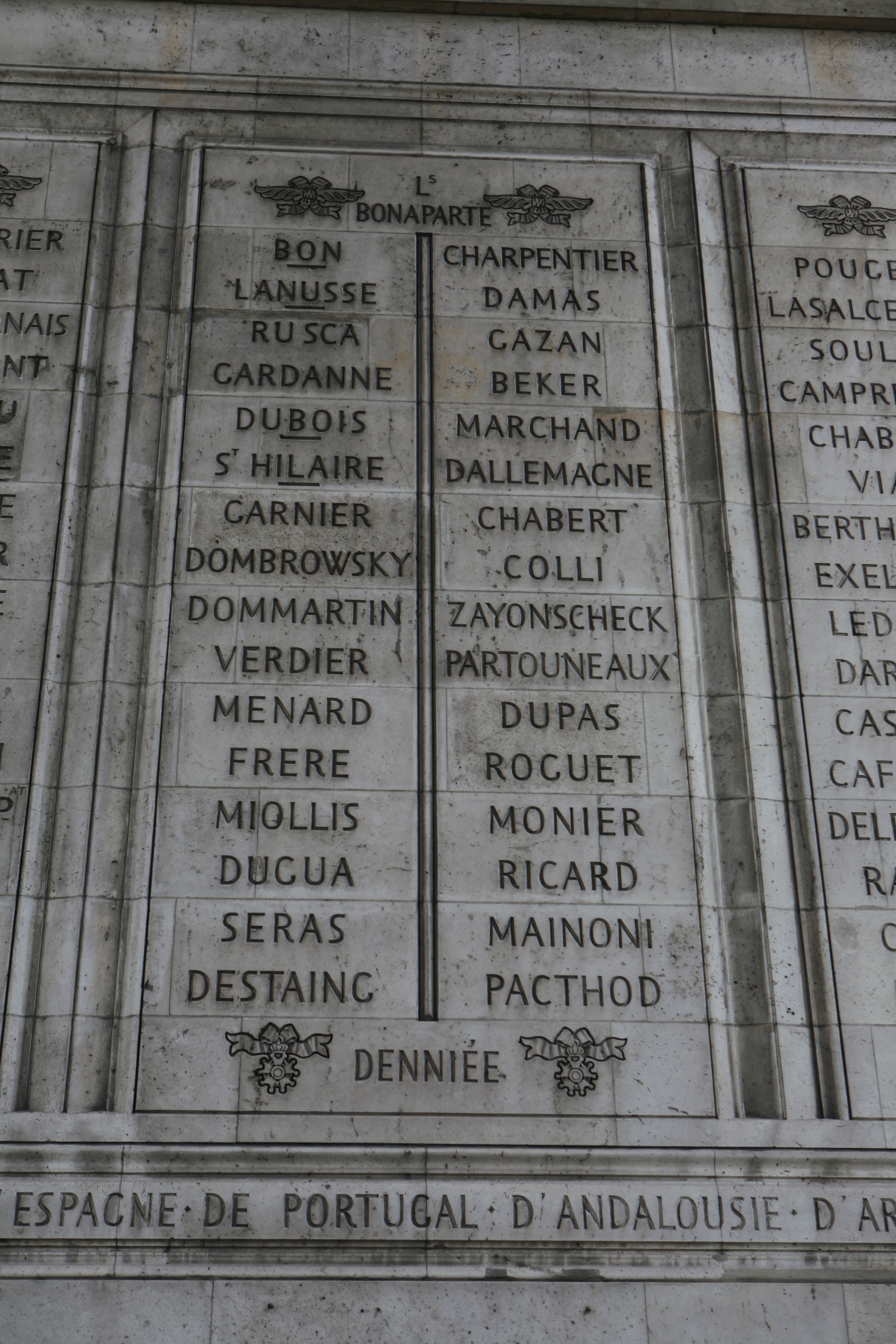
Columns 25, 26.

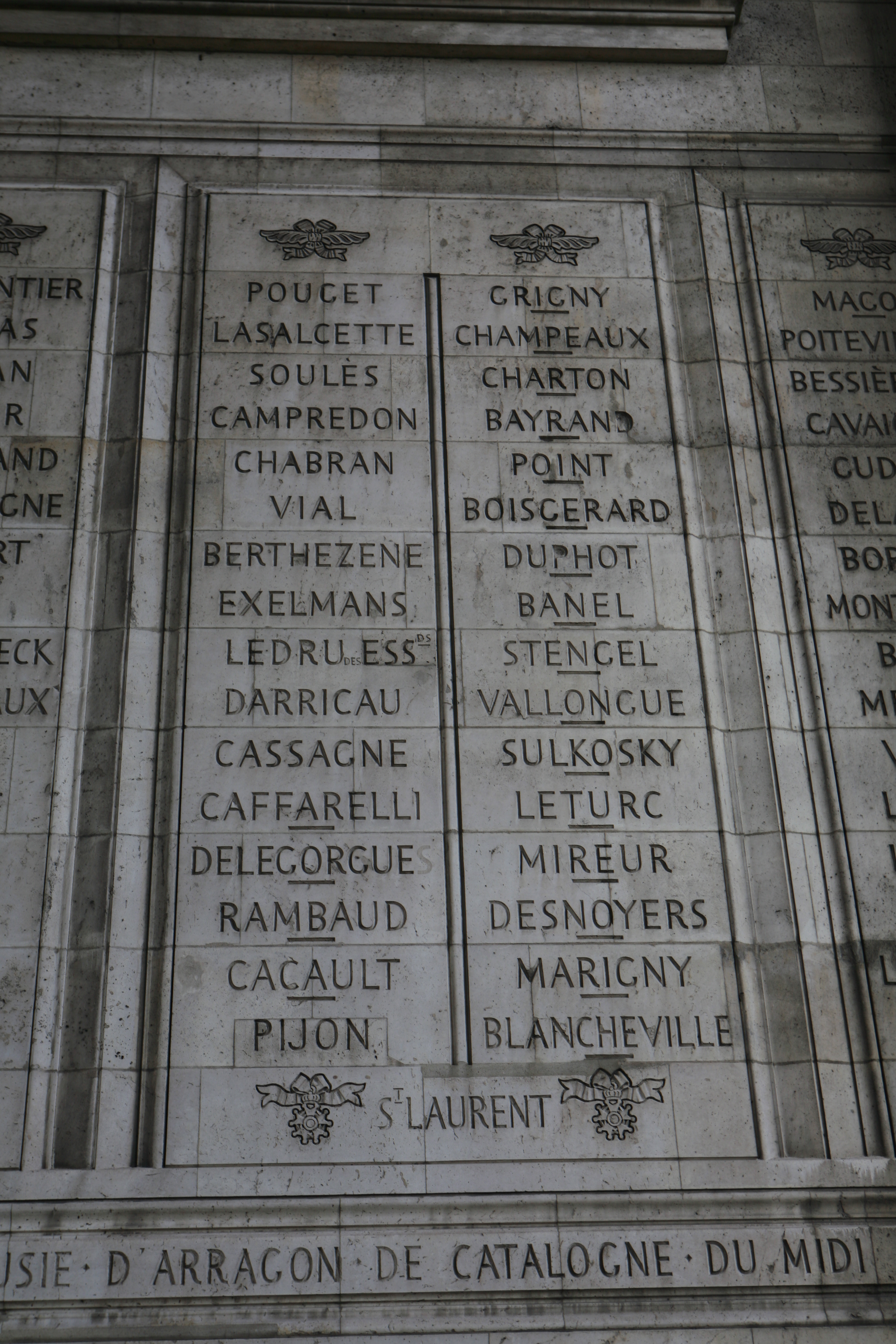
Columns 27, 28.

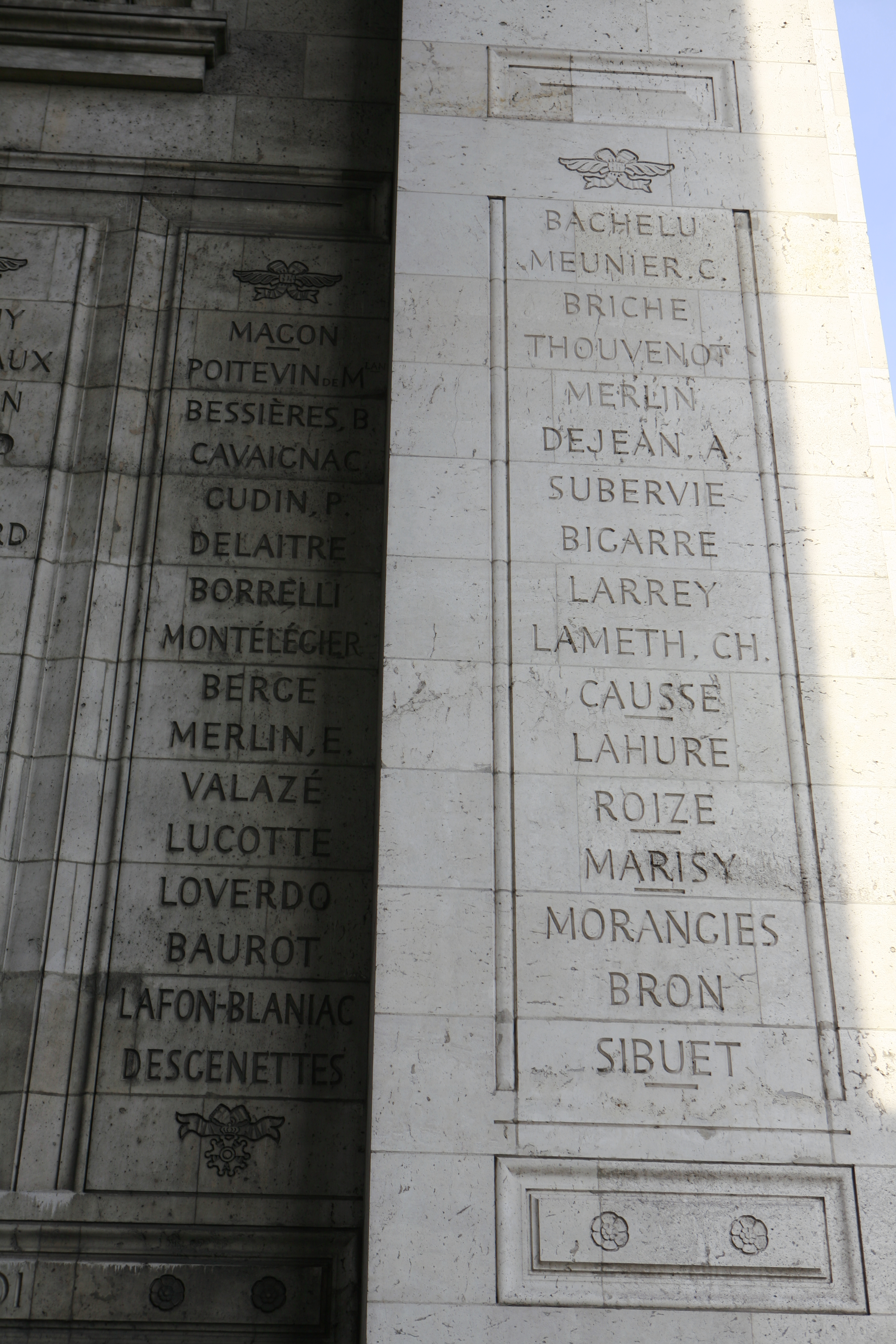
Columns 29, 30.
The 166 names inscribed on the southern pillar (Avenue des Champs-Élysées / Avenue Kléber)

Column 21	Column 22	Column 23	Column 24	Column 25	Column 26	Column 27	Column 28	Column 29	Column 30
•	•	•	•	L^{S} BONAPARTE	•	•	•	•	•
KELLERMANN, F.	RUTY	ANSELME	SERURIER	BON	CHARPENTIER	POUGET	GRIGNY	MAGON	BACHELU
RIVAUD DE LA R^{ÈRE}	SOULT, P.	BRUNET	MURAT	LANUSSE	DAMAS	LASALCETTE	CHAMPEAUX	POITEVIN DE M^{LAN}	MEUNIER, C.
FIORELLA	DIGEON	BIRON	^{E.}BEAUHARNAIS	RUSCA	GAZAN	SOULÈS	CHARTON	BESSIÈRES, B.	BRICHE
VIGNOLLE	LAPLANE	DUMERBION	MARMONT	GARDANNE	BEKER	CAMPREDON	BAYRAND	CAVAIGNAC	THOUVENOT
FAULTRIER	JEANIN	MONTESQUIOU	MENOU	DUBOIS	MARCHAND	CHABRAN	POINT	GUDIN, P.	MERLIN
CAFFARELLI, A.	DODE	DUMAS	PERRÉE	S^{T} HILAIRE	DALLEMAGNE	VIAL	BOISGERARD	DELAITRE	DEJEAN, A.
SANSON	FABRE	MASSENA	LAPOYPE	GARNIER	CHABERT	BERTHEZENE	DUPHOT	BORRELLI	SUBERVIE
PERNETY	DELAMOTTE, A.	BERTHIER	REYNIER	DOMBROWSKY	COLLI	EXELMANS	BANEL	MONTÉLÉGIER	BIGARRE
LASOWSKI	GARBÉ	AUGEREAU	LAHARPE	DOMMARTIN	ZAYONSCHECK	LEDRU DES ESS^{DS}	STENGEL	BERGE	LARREY
SARRUT	STROLTZ	JOUBERT	RAMPON	VERDIER	PARTOUNEAUX	DARRICAU	VALLONGUE	MERLIN, E.	LAMETH, CH.
ARRIGHI	QUIOT	KLEBER	BELLIARD	MENARD	DUPAS	CASSAGNE	SULKOSKY	VALAZÉ	CAUSSE
DANTHOUARD	RÉMOND, V.	BRUEYS	ANDREOSSI	FRERE	ROGUET	CAFFARELLI	LETURC	LUCOTTE	LAHURE
EMERIAU	BONNEMAINS	DESAIX	CHASSELOUP-^{AT}	MIOLLIS	MONIER	DELEGORGUES	MIREUR	LOVERDO	ROIZE
RAZOUT	S^{T} GENIÉS	BRUNE	GUYEUX	DUGUA	RICARD	RAMBAUD	DESNOYERS	BAUROT	MARISY
DÉRIOT	WILLAUMEZ	SCHAWEMBOURG	VAUBOIS	SERAS	MAINONI	CACAULT	MARIGNY	LAFON-BLANIAC	MORANGIES
TIRLET	LAMORANDIÈRE	GANTHEAUME	B^{EY} D'HILLIERS	DESTAING	PACTHOD	PIJON	BLANCHEVILLE	DESGENETTES	BRON
MORIO DE LISLE	•	CHAMORIN	•	DENNIÉE	•	S^{T} LAURENT	•	•	SIBUET

ARMEES DE DALMATIE ・ D'EGYPTE ・ D'ESPAGNE ・ DE PORTUGAL ・ D'ANDALOUSIE ・ D'ARRAGON ・ DE CATALOGNE ・ DU MIDI

== Western pillar ==
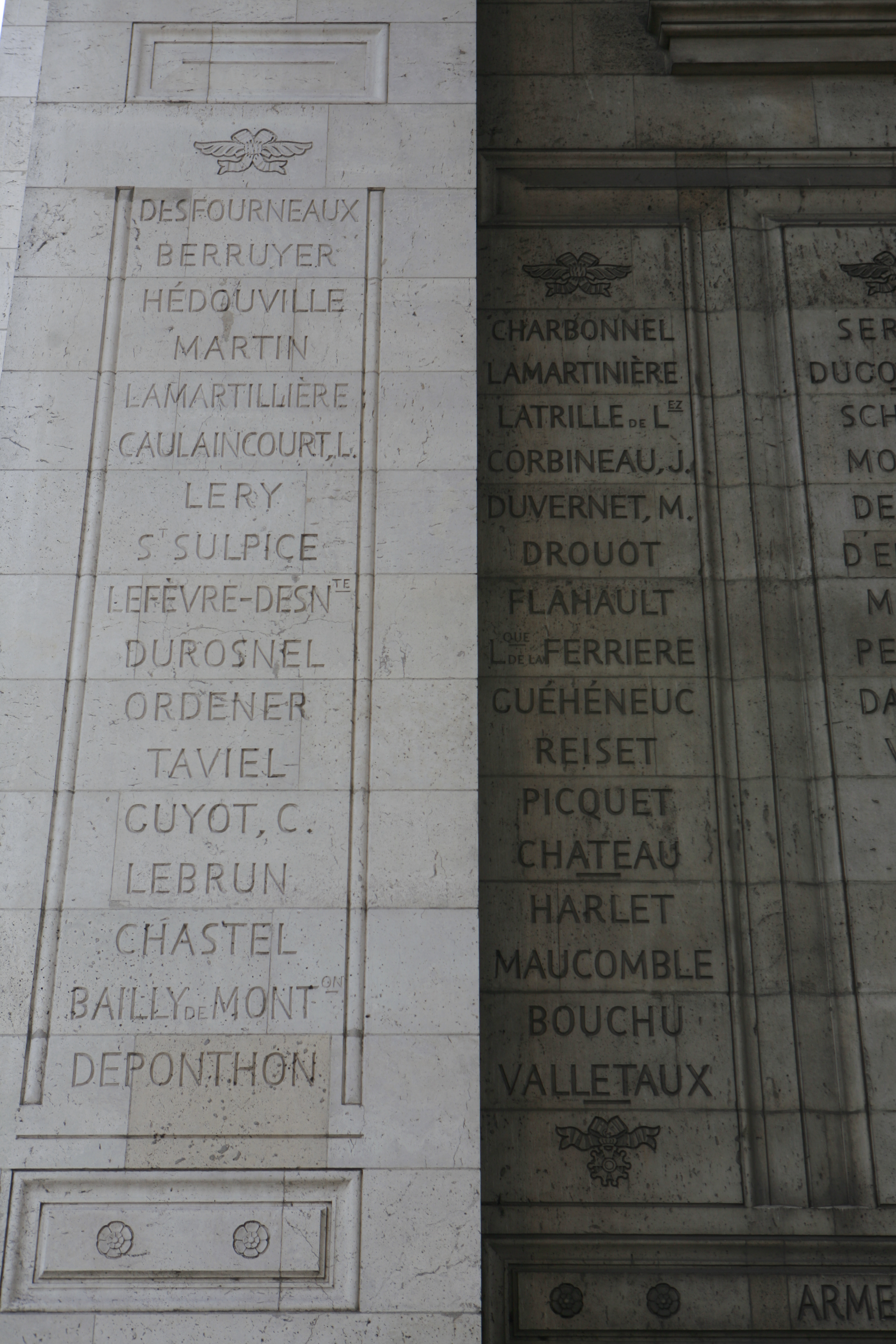
Columns 31, 32.

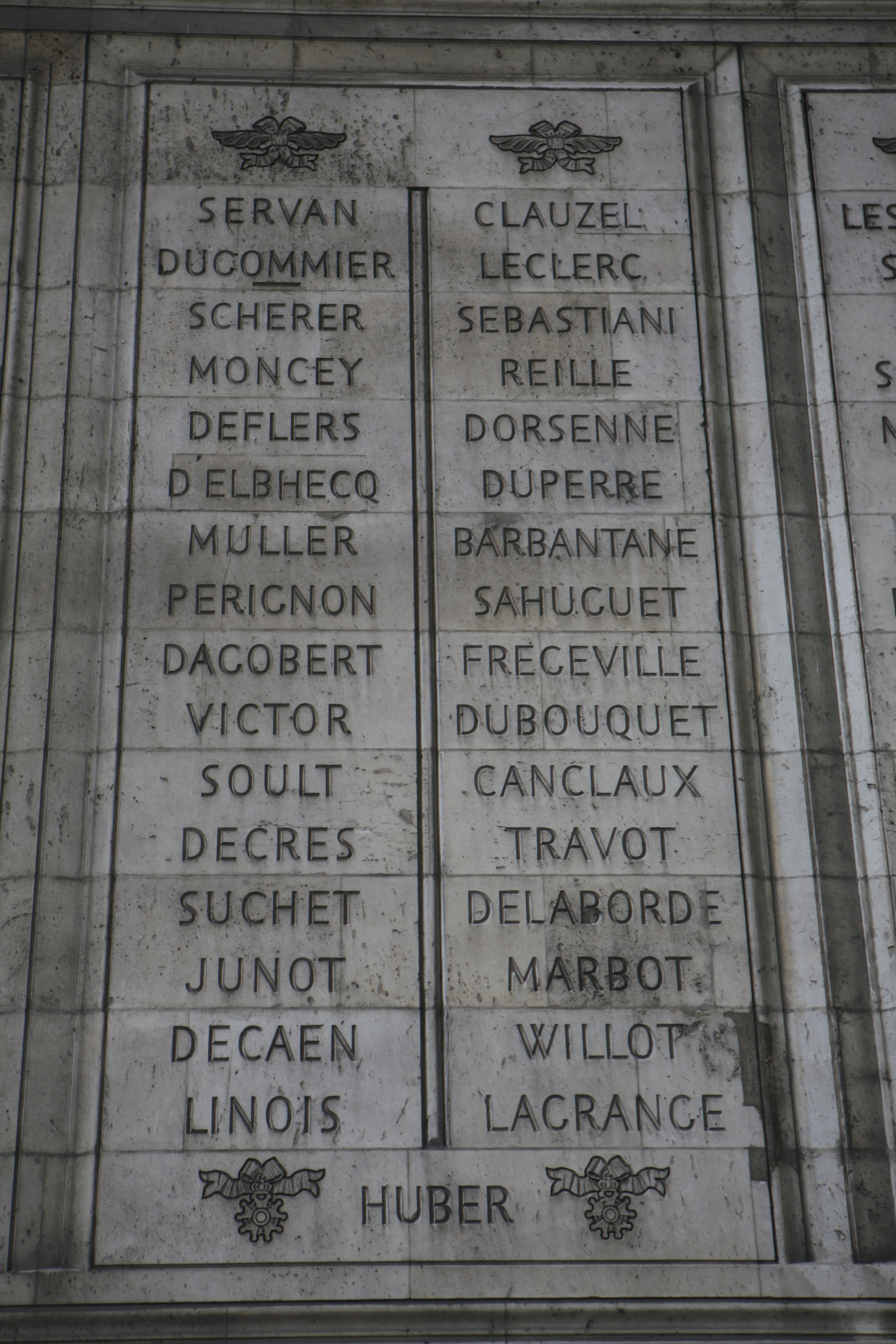
Columns 33, 34.

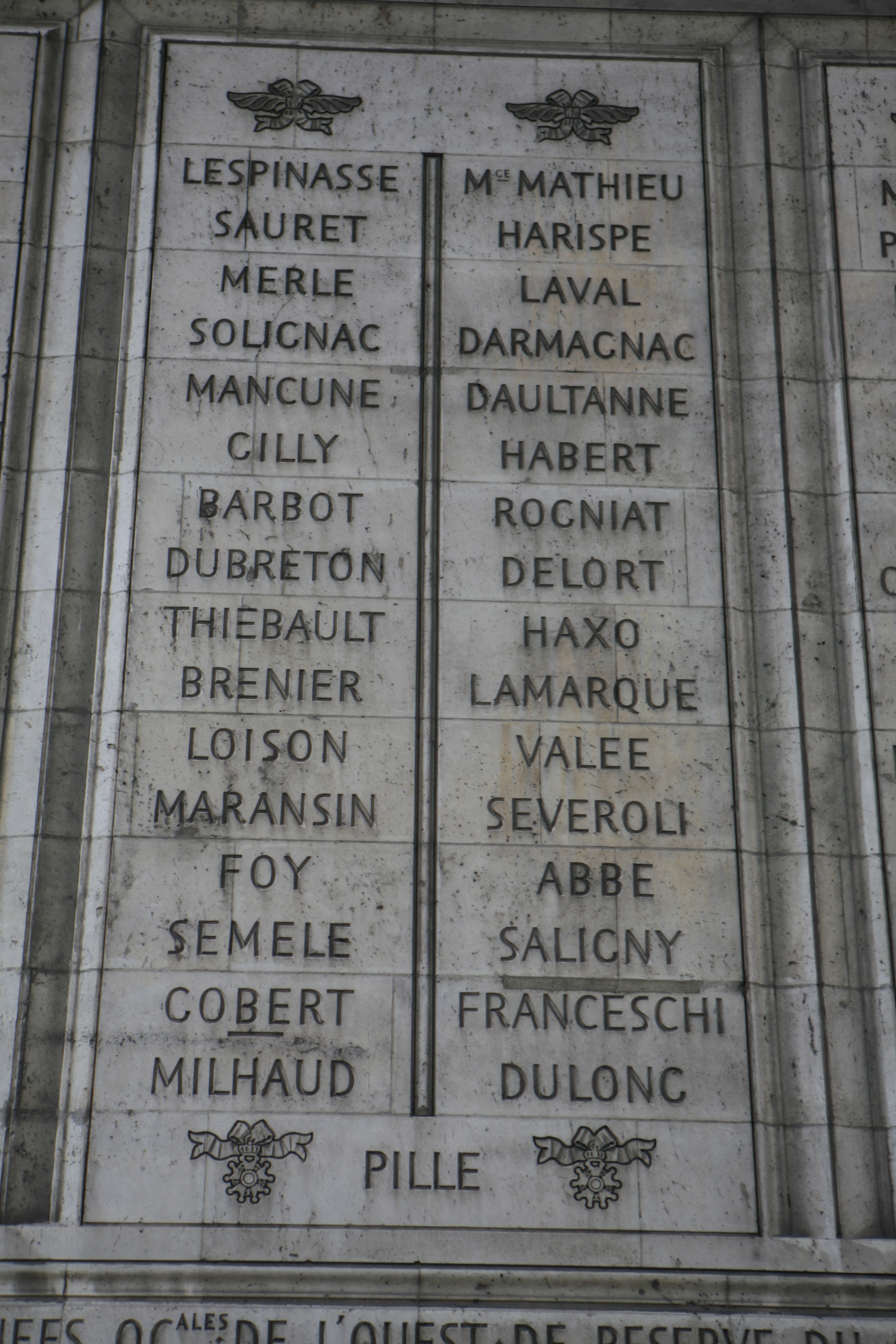
Columns 35, 36.

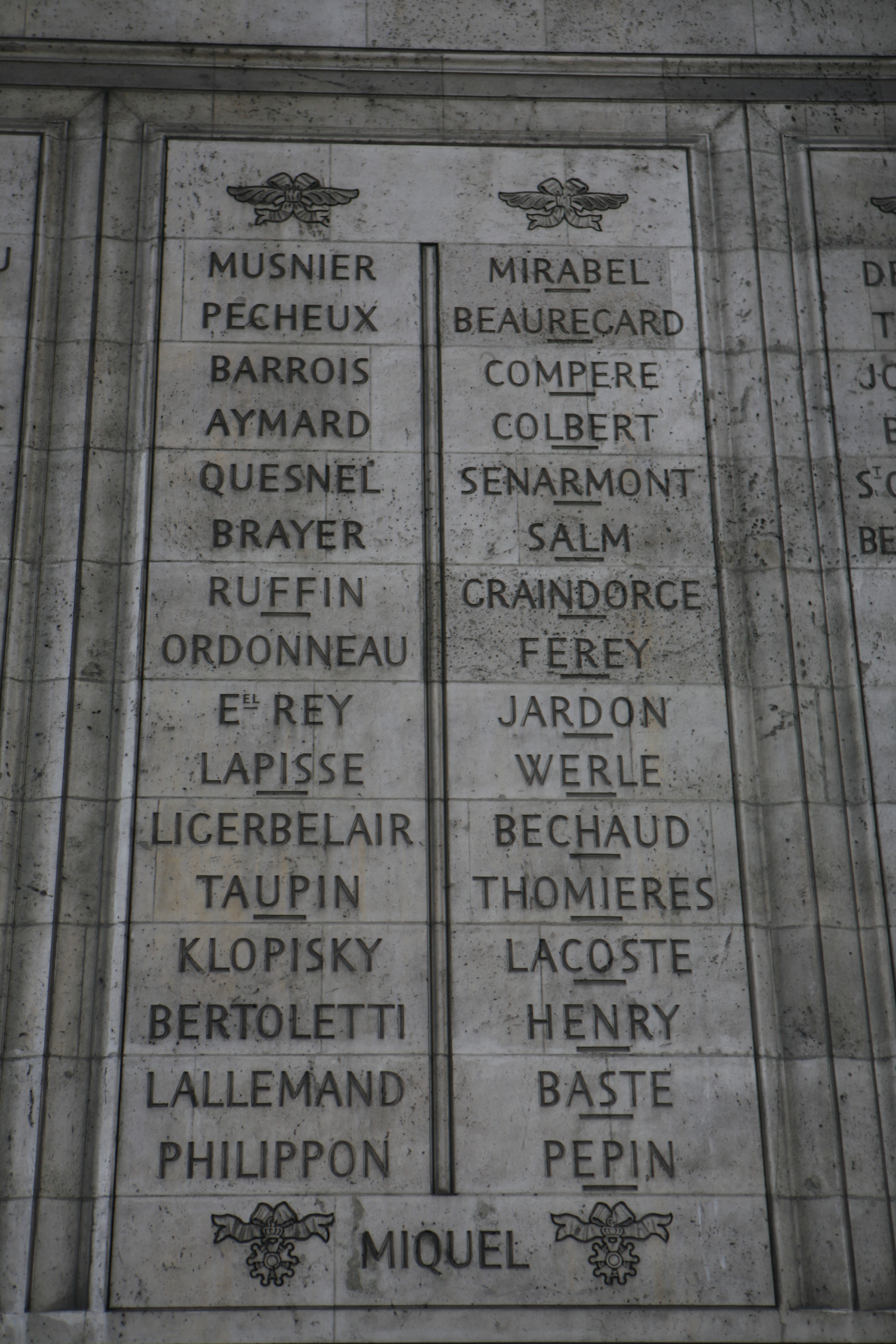
Columns 37, 38.

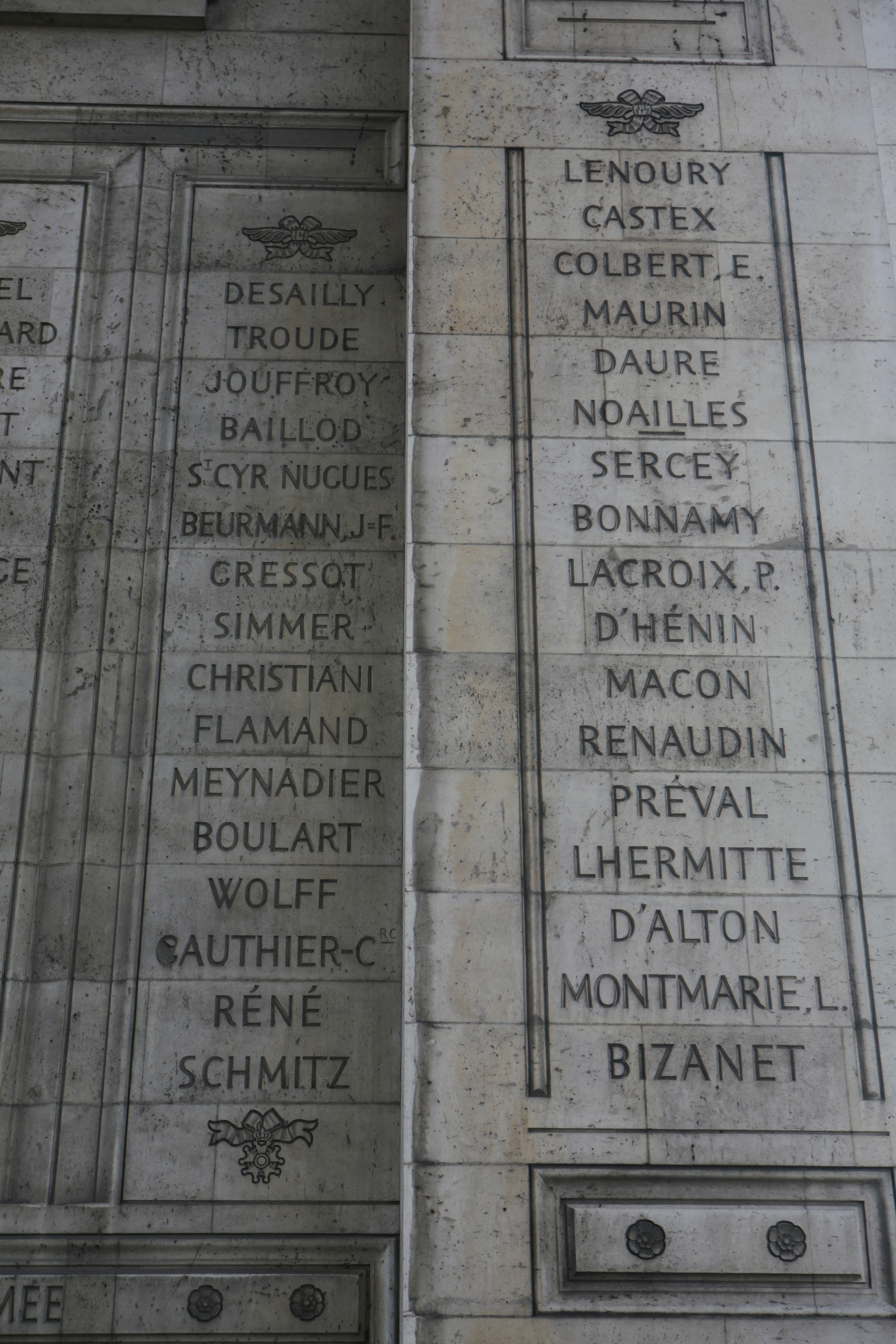
Columns 39, 40.
The 165 names inscribed on the western pillar (Avenue de la Grande Armée / Avenue Kléber)

Column 31	Column 32	Column 33	Column 34	Column 35	Column 36	Column 37	Column 38	Column 39	Column 40
•	•	•	•	•	•	•	•	•	•
DESFOURNEAUX	CHARBONNEL	SERVAN	CLAUZEL	LESPINASSE	M^{CE} MATHIEU	MUSNIER	MIRABEL	DESAILLY	LENOURY
BERRUYER	LAMARTINIÈRE	DUGOMMIER	LECLERC	SAURET	HARISPE	PECHEUX	BEAUREGARD	TROUDE	CASTEX
HÉDOUVILLE	LATRILLE DE L^{EZ}	SCHERER	SEBASTIANI	MERLE	LAVAL	BARROIS	COMPERE	JOUFFROY	COLBERT, E.
MARTIN	CORBINEAU, J.	MONCEY	REILLE	SOLIGNAC	DARMAGNAC	AYMARD	COLBERT	BAILLOD	MAURIN
LAMARTILLIÈRE	DUVERNET, M.	DEFLERS	DORSENNE	MANCUNE	DAULTANNE	QUESNEL	SENARMONT	S^{T} CYR NUGUES	DAURE
CAULAINCOURT, L.	DROUOT	D'ELBHECQ	DUPERRE	GILLY	HABERT	BRAYER	SALM	BEURMANN, J=F.	NOAILLES
LERY	FLAHAULT	MULLER	BARBANTANE	BARBOT	ROGNIAT	RUFFIN	GRAINDORGE	GRESSOT	SERCEY
S^{T} SULPICE	L^{QUE} DE LA FERRIERE	PERIGNON	SAHUGUET	DUBRETON	DELORT	ORDONNEAU	FEREY	SIMMER	BONNAMY
LEFÈVRE-DESN^{TE}	GUÉHÉNEUC	DAGOBERT	FREGEVILLE	THIEBAULT	HAXO	E^{EL} REY	JARDON	CHRISTIANI	LACROIX, P.
DUROSNEL	REISET	VICTOR	DUBOUQUET	BRENIER	LAMARQUE	LAPISSE	WERLE	FLAMAND	D'HÉNIN
ORDENER	PICQUET	SOULT	CANCLAUX	LOISON	VALEE	LIGER BELAIR	BECHAUD	MEYNADIER	MACON
TAVIEL	CHATEAU	DECRES	TRAVOT	MARANSIN	SEVEROLI	TAUPIN	THOMIERES	BOULARD	RENAUDIN
GUYOT, C.	HARLET	SUCHET	DELABORDE	FOY	ABBE	KLOPISKY	LACOSTE	WOLFF	PRÉVAL
LEBRUN	MAUCOMBLE	JUNOT	MARBOT	SEMELE	SALIGNY	BERTOLETTI	HENRY	GAUTHIER-C^{RC}	LHERMITTE
CHASTEL	BOUCHU	DECAEN	WILLOT	GOBERT	FRANCESCHI	LALLEMAND	BASTE	RÉNÉ	D'ALTON
BAILLY DE MONT^{ON}	VALLETAUX	LINOIS	LAGRANGE	MILHAUD	DULONG	PHILIPPON	PEPIN	SCHMITZ	MONTMARIE, L.
DEPONTHON	•	HUBER	•	PILLE	•	MIQUEL	•	•	BIZANET

ARMEES DES PYRENEES OR^{ALES} ・ DES PYRENEES OC^{ALES} ・ DE L'OUEST ・ DE RESERVE ・ DU CAMP DE BOULOGNE ・ GRANDE ARMEE

== See also ==
- Battles inscribed on the Arc de Triomphe
- Names inscribed on the Eiffel Tower
- List of French generals of the Revolutionary and Napoleonic Wars
