= Lochet =

Lochet is a surname. Notable people with the surname include:

- Bruno Lochet (born 1959), French actor
- Pierre-Charles Lochet (1767–1807), French brigadier general
