= François Frédéric Campana =

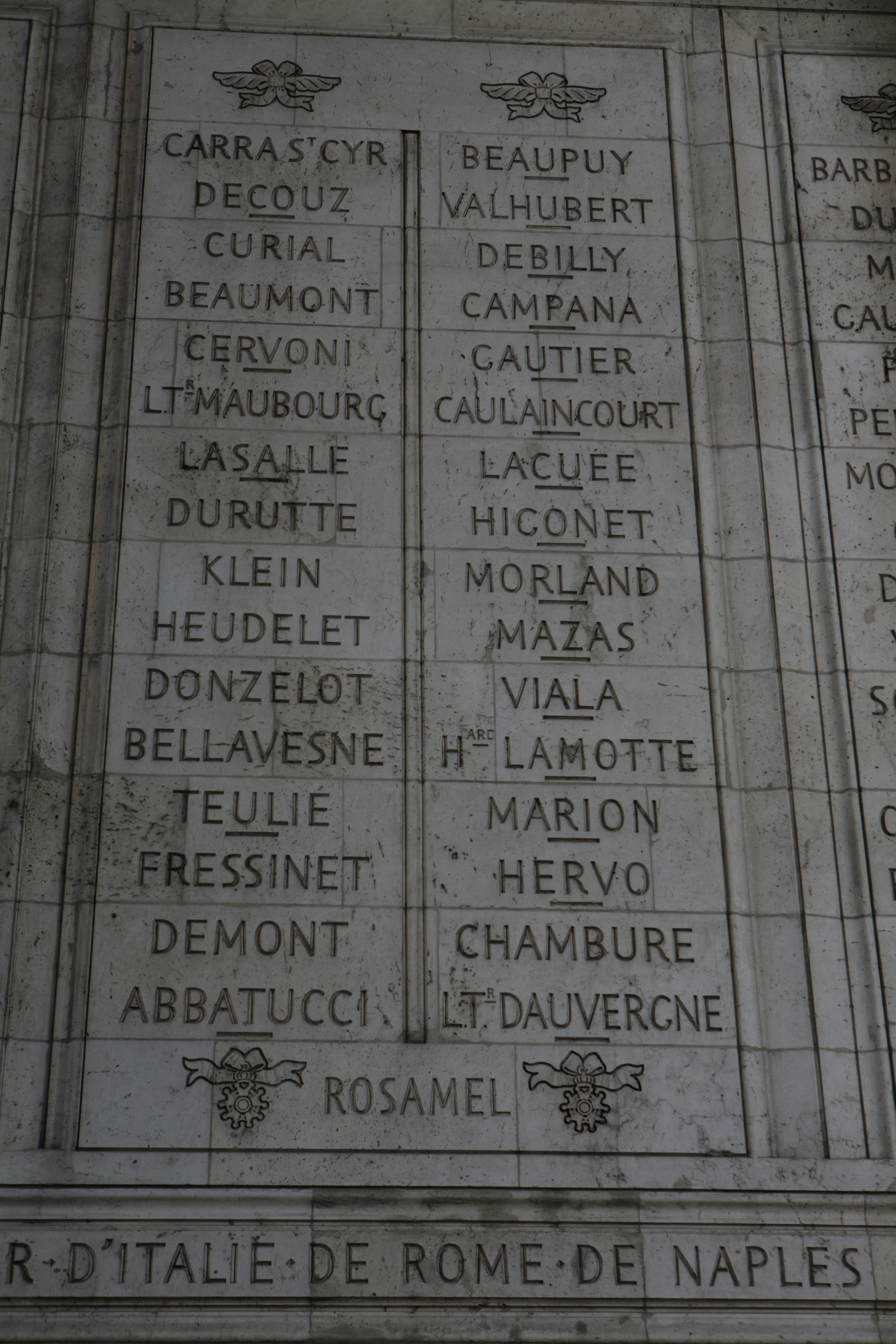
Details of the Arc de Triomphe. Eastern pillar, columns 17, 18.

Francesco Federico Campana (15 February 1771–16 February 1807) was an Italian général de brigade who served in the armies of Napoleon I of France.

== Life ==
Campana was born and raised in Turin, Peveragno or Cuneo. Previously in Piedmontese service, he began his career in the French Revolutionary Army operating in Italy (known as the armée d'Italie) and became aide de camp to general Victor. He fought in the 1795 campaign against the Austro-Sardinians and was wounded at the Battle of Loano. He became prefect of Marengo in 1803 and, after being promoted to General de brigade in 1805, fought in the campaigns of 1805, 1806, and 1807. He was killed in the Battle at Ostrołęka in 1807. On Napoleon's orders his name was engraved on the eastern pillar of the Arc de Triomphe.
