= Vital Joachim Chamorin =

French general officer (1773–1811)

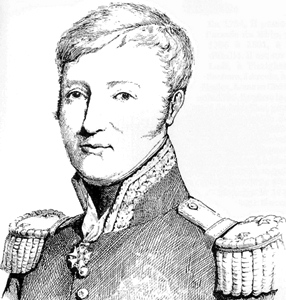
- Born: 16 August 1773; Bonnelles, Yvelines, France
- Died: 25 March 1811 (aged 37) Campo Maior, Portugal
- Allegiance: France
- Branch: Cavalry
- Service years: 1788–1811
- Rank: General of Brigade
- Awards: Légion d'Honneur; Baron of the Empire

Vital Joachim Chamorin (French pronunciation: [vital ʒɔ.aʃɛ̃ ʃamɔʁɛ̃]; 16 August 1773 – 25 March 1811) was a French general officer during the Napoleonic Wars. He enlisted as a private soldier in the French Royal Army and was commissioned as an infantry officer after the French Revolution. Chamorin was wounded at the 1794 Battle of Boulou and afterwards became an aide-de-camp, having two horses shot from under him at the 1800 Battle of Marengo. He became a cavalry officer in December 1800 and was appointed to command the 26th Dragoon Regiment in 1811. In the Peninsular War he was commended for his actions at the 28 March 1809 Battle of Medellín, but a recommendation for his promotion to general was not approved. After a further commendation for his actions on 11 February 1811, he was promoted to brigade general on 5 March. He was killed in action with British cavalry shortly afterwards at the Battle of Campo Maior.

== Early life and career ==
Chamorin was born in Bonnelles on 16 August 1773. He joined the 7th Infantry Regiment as a private on 28 December 1788. He was promoted to corporal on 27 April 1782 and to corporal-quartermaster on 27 May 1792 and served in the occupation of Savoy. Chamorin was commissioned as a sub-lieutenant in the 6th Infantry Regiment on 11 November 1793 and was wounded in action at the late 30 April to 1 May 1794 Battle of Boulou, a bullet striking his left leg. Under the French Republic he became a captain in the 8th Côte-d'Or battalion of the National Volunteers and later commanded a grenadier company of that unit. In 1799 he was an aide-de-camp to a divisional general and at the 14 June 1800 Battle of Marengo had two horses shot from under him while carrying out his role. On 25 December 1800 he was appointed Chef d'escadron (cavalry major) in the 6th Hussar Regiment. Chamorin was later appointed a member of the Legion of Honour on 15 June 1804, an officer of the legion on 2 December 1805, and a commander on 11 December 1808.

== 26th Dragoon Regiment ==
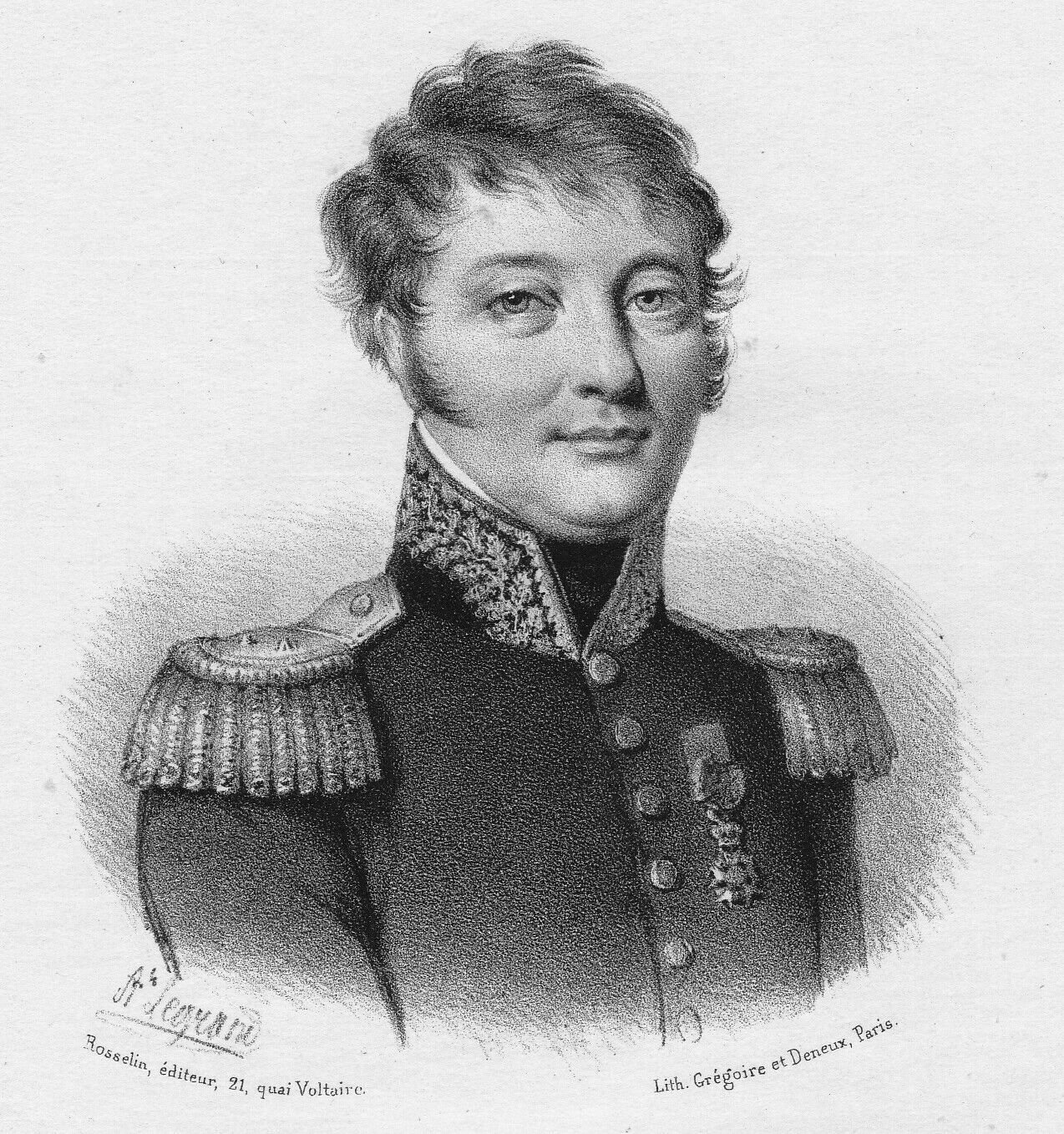
Posthumous depiction of Chamorin, c. 1830

Chamorin was appointed to command the 26th Dragoon Regiment on 16 February 1811 and led them for 29 months during the Peninsular War. Chamorin was appointed a Baron of the Empire on 10 February 1809. He was commended for his leadership during the 28 March 1809 Battle of Medellín and his division's commander Victor de Fay de La Tour-Maubourg recommended him for promotion to brigade general, but this was not approved by Marshal Claude-Victor Perrin. Chamorin was mentioned in the army's order of the day for his actions on 11 February 1811 leading his dragoons against Spanish forces in the run up to the Battle of the Gebora. He was again recommended for promotion by Tour-Maubourg and subsequently promoted to brigade general on 5 March 1811.

Chamorin was killed at the Battle of Campo Maior on 25 March 1811 while fighting against the British light cavalry of William Carr Beresford. An account in London Courier and Evening Gazette that April noted Chamorin was killed by Corporal Logan of the 13th Light Dragoons, after Chamorin had sought revenge by single combat as Logan had killed one of his men. The article stated that Logan struck Chamorin twice in the face, the second cut almost cleaving the skull in two. His helmet was kept by the 13th Light Dragoons' paymaster and his sword by its commander Lieutenant Colonel Michael Head. The day before the battle he had said to his adjutant: "I hate the English. I do not want to become their prisoner and if I ever fell into their hands, then I am dead." On the morning of the battle he told his adjutant he had had a premonition of his death in his dreams that night. His name is one of those inscribed on the Arc de Triomphe in Paris.
