= Nicolas-Marie Songis des Courbons =

French artillery general (1761–1810)

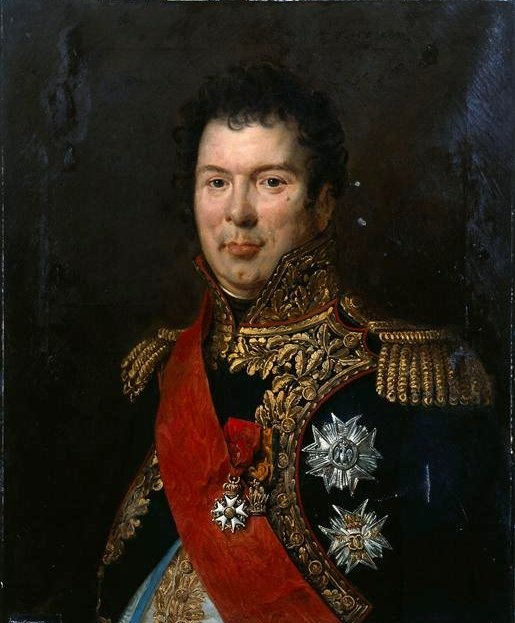
- Portrait by Robert Lefèvre, 1806 (copy by Guérin)
- Born: 23 April 1761; Troyes, France
- Died: 27 December 1810 (aged 49); Paris, France
- Burial place: Panthéon, Paris
- Military career
- Allegiance: Kingdom of France, Kingdom of France (1791–1792), French First Republic, First French Empire.
- Branch: Artillery
- Service years: 1780–1809
- Rank: General of Division
- Commands: Second-in-command of the "Army of the North" Artillery, Chief of battalion in the 8th Foot Artillery regiment, Commander of the 1st Horse Artillery regiment, Commander of the Grande Armée Artillery.
- Conflicts: French Revolutionary Wars; Napoleonic Wars
- Awards: Count of the Empire, Grand Aigle, Légion d'honneur, Knight of the Iron Crown
- Other work: First General Inspector for Artillery

Nicolas-Marie Songis des Courbons, Count of the Empire, (French pronunciation: [nikɔlɑ maʁi sɔ̃ʒi de kuʁbɔ̃]; 23 April 1761 – 27 December 1810), was a French artillery commander during the French Revolutionary Wars, who rose to the rank of General of Division in 1800 and served as commander of the Grande Armée artillery between 1805 and 1809, during the Napoleonic Wars.

== Early career during the Revolutionary Wars ==
Born in Troyes on 23 April 1761, Songis des Courbons entered the Royal Artillery corps as a student on 1 August 1779 and became a Second Lieutenant in the 4th artillery regiment on 18 July 1780, and a Captain on 3 June 1787. He took part to the Wars of the French Revolution with the "Army of the North". When General Dumouriez was appointed commander of the army, Songis des Courbons was second-in-command of the army's 80 high-calibre guns artillery reserve.

Named interim chief of battalion in 1794, his promotion was made permanent in the 8th foot artillery regiment. Songis was transferred to the "Army of Italy" the same year, displaying exceptional talent and knowledge of his arm, which drew the attention of the army's commander-in-chief, General Napoleon Bonaparte. Songis des Courbons rendered invaluable services during the Italian campaigns of the French Revolutionary Wars, at the battles of Salo, Lonato, Castiglione. Impressed by Songis's battlefield performances, Bonaparte obtained for him the rank of chef de brigade (colonel) from the French Directory.

A commander of artillery in the French "Army of the Orient" artillery, Songis des Courbons campaigned in Egypt and Syria taking part to the numerous battles that the French had to give during this expedition. Named commander of the 1st horse artillery regiment in 1798, he displayed an extraordinary activity during the siege of Saint Jean d'Acre, in 1799. The bravery and intelligence he showed on this occasion deservedly earned him the rank of brigadier general. During this campaign, Songis des Courbons spent every minute he could spare studying his arm, earning the rank of general of division in January 1800. He took part to the battle of Heliopolis in 1800 and to the defense of Alexandria in 1801.

Returned to France with the army, Songis des Courbons took command of the artillery of the Guard of the Consuls. He became First Inspector General of Artillery and Grand Officier of the Légion d'honneur in 1804, then a Grand Aigle (Grand Eagle) of the Légion d'honneur the next year.

== Napoleonic Wars ==
Between 1805 and 1807, General Songis des Courbons served as commander-in-chief of artillery in the Grande Armée, taking part to the army's great victories during the War of the Third Coalition and War of the Fourth Coalition. In 1808, he resumed his duties as Inspector General of Artillery and was created a Count of the Empire, thus becoming a dignitary of the Empire.

At the outbreak of the War of the Fifth Coalition in 1809, Songis retained his position as commander-in-chief of the artillery in the Army of Germany. In this capacity, on 11 May, just 10 days before the battle of Aspern-Essling, he was sent on a crucial mission to reconnoiter the Danube river line between Vienna and Pressburg, in search of a suitable crossing location. He then commanded the army's artillery during the bloody struggle at Aspern and Essling. After the battle, Songis was active in coordinating the set-up of numerous French artillery batteries, as Napoleon was preparing another crossing of the Danube and wanted to deploy his batteries in such a way as to deceive the Austrians into thinking that he would cross in the same location as at Aspern-Essling. However, the health of Songis severely declined before he could finish his assignment and Napoleon allowed him to return to France, leaving his command to General Lariboisière.

General of Division count Nicolas-Marie Songis des Courbons died in Paris on 27 December 1810, following a long illness.

== Recognition ==
During his lifetime, General Songis was rewarded for his military activity. He was created a Count of the Empire, a title for which the letters patent were issued on 1 April 1809, thus making him a dignitary of the Empire. He was also made a Knight of the Iron Crown, a military order in the Kingdom of Italy. On 30 June 1807, Songis had also received the Polish domain of Zelgniewo, in the Bromberg department, as well as an endowment of 30,000 Francs paid by the Kingdom of Westphalia and another of 5,882 Francs on the Empire's Grand Livre. Additionally, he received an endowment of 100,000 Francs for the purchase of a Hôtel particulier.

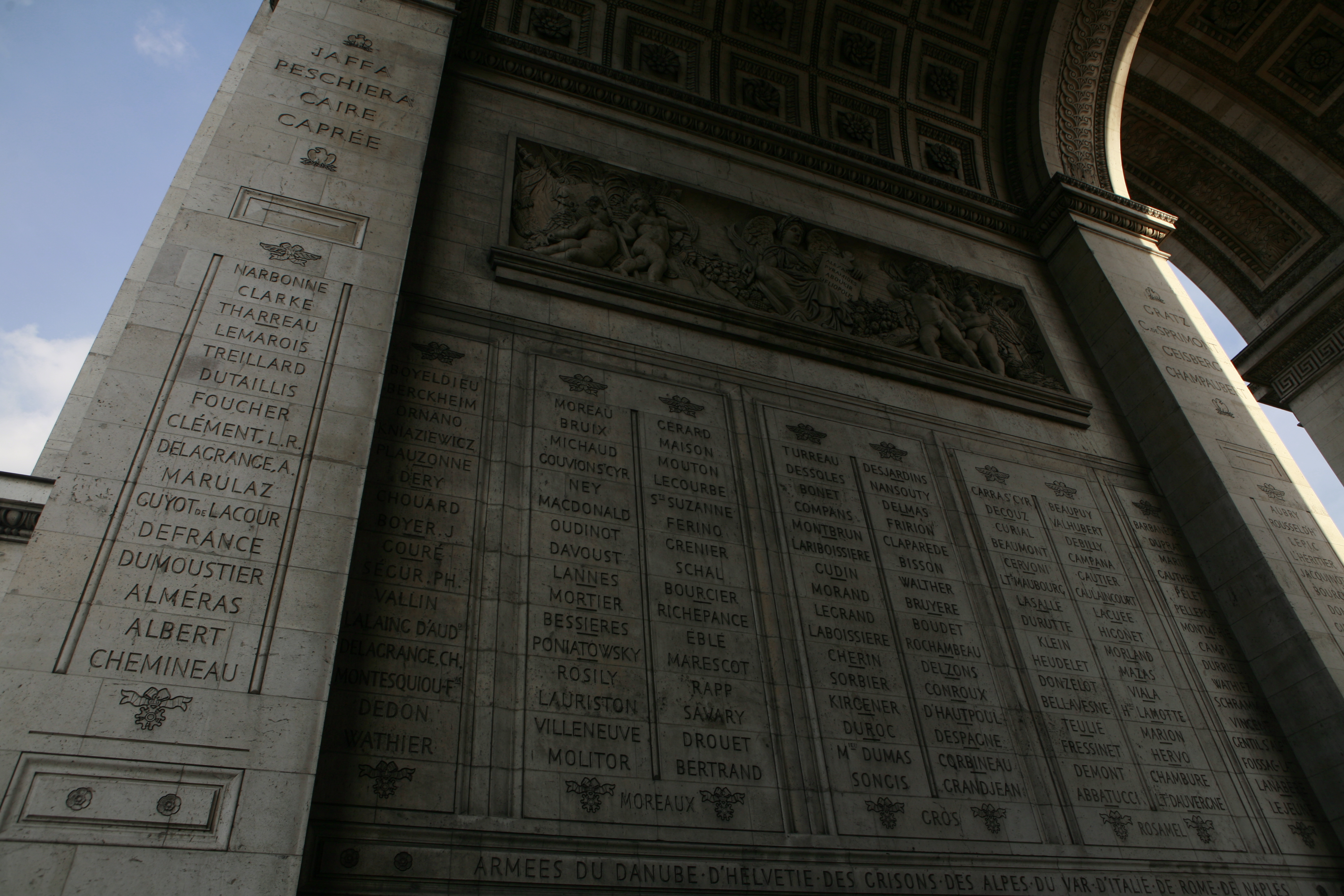
The name SONGIS inscribed on the Eastern Pillar of the Arc de Triomphe (fifth column from left to right, 16th name from top to bottom).

As a recognition to his military merits, General Songis is buried at the Panthéon in Paris, alongside other fellow soldiers of the Napoleonic Wars.

The name SONGIS is inscribed under the Arc de Triomphe, Eastern Pillar.

== Sources ==
- (in French) Fierro, Alfredo; Palluel-Guillard, André; Tulard, Jean - "Histoire et Dictionnaire du Consulat et de l'Empire”, Éditions Robert Laffont, ISBN 2-221-05858-5
- (in French) Gotteri, Nicole - "Grands dignitaires du Premier Empire", NEL, 1990, ISBN 2-7233-0411-6
- (in French) Hourtoulle, François-Guy - „Wagram, L'apogée de l'Empire”, Histoire & Collections, ISBN 2-913903-32-0
- (in French) Mullié, Charles - "Biographie des célébrités militaires des armées de terre et de mer de 1789 à 1850"
- (in English) Rothenberg, Gunther E. (2005). The emperor's last victory : Napoleon and the Battle of Wagram. London: Cassell Military. ISBN 0304367117. LCCN 2006491419.
- (in French) Tulard, Jean - "Dictionnaire Napoléon”; volume 1, Librairie Artème Fayard, 1999, ISBN 2-213-60485-1
