= André Bruno de Frévol de Lacoste =

Andre Bruno de Frevol de Lacoste
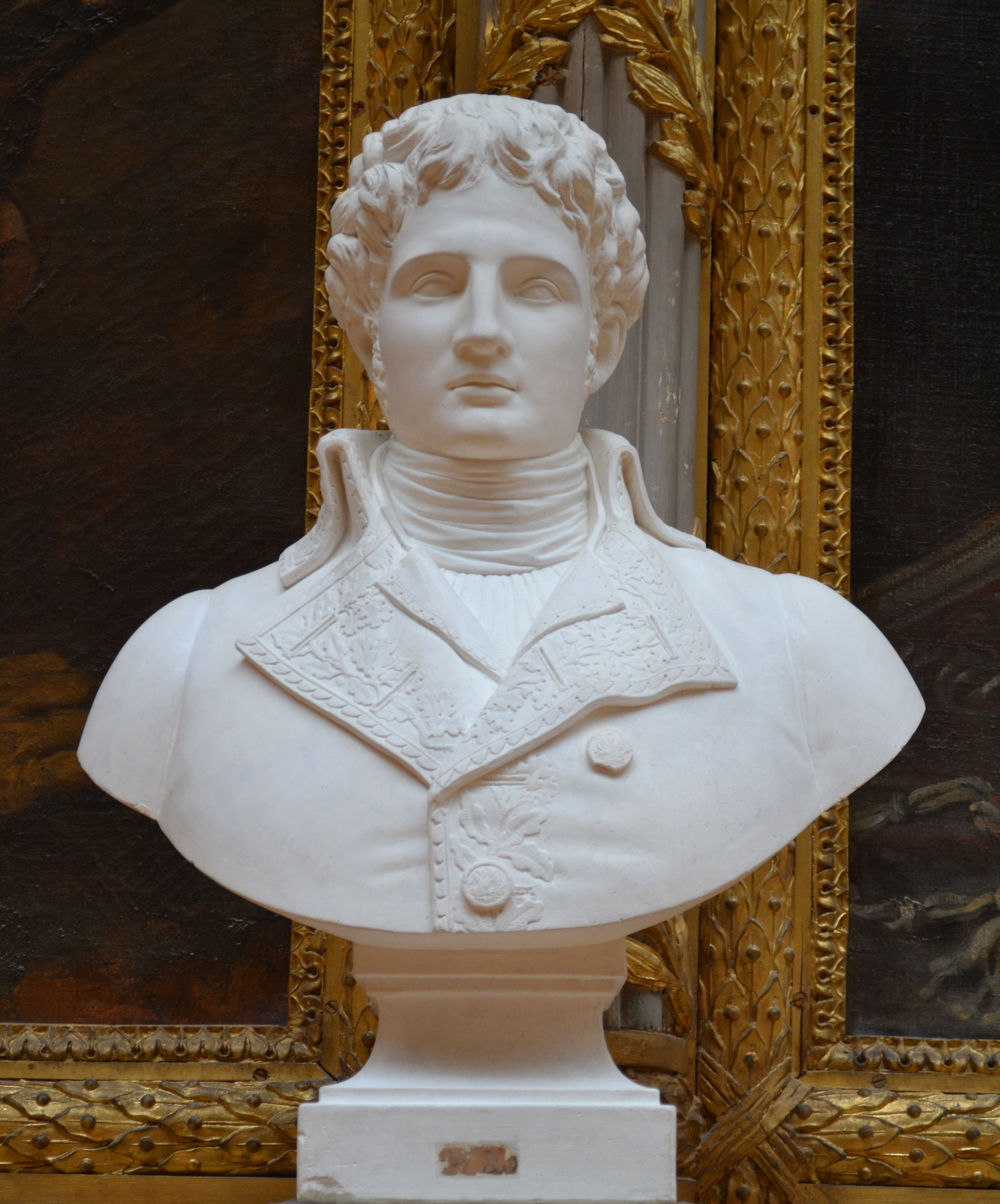
- Bust of Lacoste
- Born: June 14, 1775; Pradelles, Haute-Loire, France
- Died: February 2, 1809 (aged 33); Saragosse, France

Signature
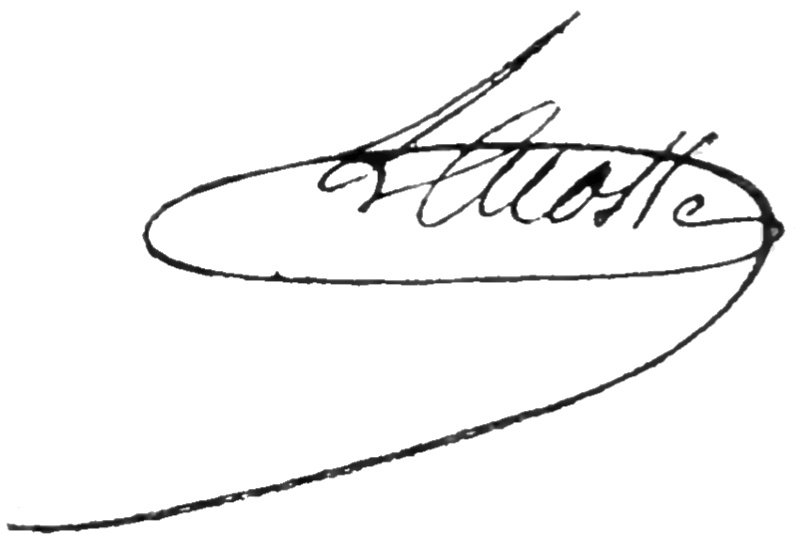

André Bruno de Frévol de Lacoste (French pronunciation: [ɑ̃dʁe bʁyno də fʁevɔl də lakɔst]; 14 June 1775 in Pradelles – 2 February 1809 in Saragosse) was a French general of the First Empire. He was killed during the siege of Zaragoza.

== Honours ==
- Lacoste's name is engraved on the Arc de Triomphe, 38th column.
