= Victor Joseph Delcambre =

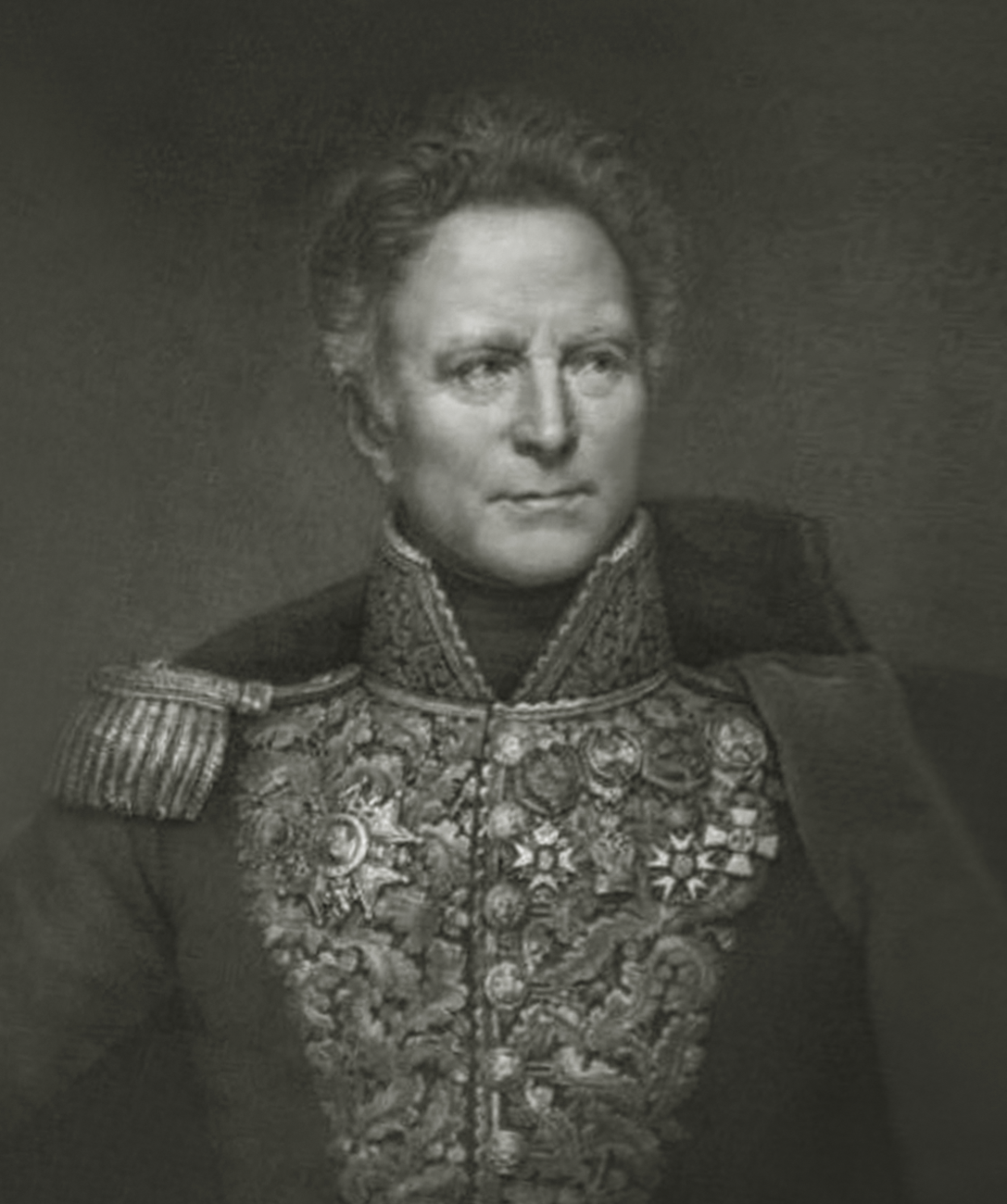
Brigadier General Baron Victor Joseph Delcambre

Brigadier General Victor-Joseph Delcambre, Baron de Champvert (10 March 1770 in Douai – 23 October 1858 in Paris) was a French military officer during the French Revolutionary and the Napoleonic wars. He was Chief of Staff of General d'Erlon's 1st Corps, part of the Army of the North, during the Waterloo Campaign of 1815.

His name is inscribed on the north side of the Arc de Triomphe.
