= Charles-Étienne-François Ruty =

French artillery officer

Charles-Étienne-François de Ruty
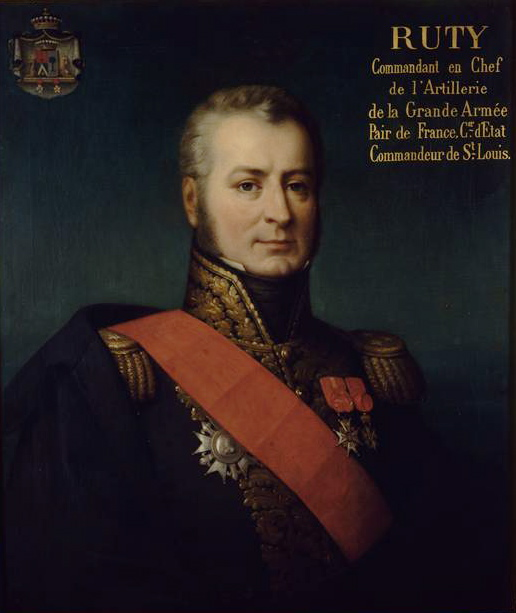
- A contemporary portrait of General Count de Ruty.
- Born: 4 November 1774; Besançon, France
- Died: 24 April 1828 (aged 53); Paris, France
- Burial place: Père Lachaise Cemetery
- Military career
- Allegiance: (France) French First Republic, (France) First French Empire, Bourbon Restoration
- Service years: 1793–1815
- Rank: General of Division
- Commands: Artillery
- Conflicts: French Revolutionary Wars; Napoleonic Wars
- Awards: Name inscribed under the Arc de Triomphe, Baron, later Count of the Empire
- Other work: General inspector for artillery, general director for gunpowders and saltpeter, state counsellor, Peer of France.

Charles-Étienne-François de Ruty (French pronunciation: [ʃaʁl etjɛn fʁɑ̃swa də ʁyti]; 1774–1828), count, was a French artillery officer during the French Revolutionary Wars and Napoleonic Wars, who rose to the rank of general of division, state counsellor (1818) and Peer of France from 1819.

== Early career ==
A graduate of the Châlons-en-Champagne artillery school in 1793, Charles-Etienne de Ruty is at once incorporated in the Army of the North, then in the Army of the Rhine, participating in major battles during the War of the First Coalition. In 1798, he joined general Napoleon Bonaparte's French Campaign in Egypt and Syria, and from 1799 held the position of director of the artillery park of the Army of Egypt, with the rank of Chef de bataillon.

== Napoleonic Wars ==
From 1805 onwards, Ruty took part to the campaigns of the Grande Armée during the War of the Third Coalition and War of the Fourth Coalition, serving as artillery park director for the Army Corps of Marshal Michel Ney, then Marshal Joachim Murat. A brigadier general from 1807, he served with distinction at the battle of Friedland. In 1808 he was created a baron of the Empire, serving as commander of the artillery school in Toulouse, before being sent to serve in Spain, towards the end of that year. He contributed significantly to the successful sieges of Ciudad Rodrigo and Almeida, before taking command of Marshal Jean-de-Dieu Soult's artillery in the armies of the South and of Andalusia. During this campaign he invented a type of howitzer that bears his name. In 1813, Ruty was recalled to France, and promoted to general of division, before being named commander of Marshal Nicolas Oudinot's Corps artillery during the Saxon campaign of the War of the Sixth Coalition. In November 1813, Ruty was created a count of the Empire. After Napoleon's abdication in 1814, Ruty served the Bourbon Restoration, but during the Hundred Days he joined the Emperor, who named him commander of the artillery of the Army of the North, with Ruty playing a significant role at the battle of Waterloo. General count de Ruty finished his military career as general inspector for artillery during the Second Restoration, subsequently serving as general director for gunpowders and saltpeter (1817), state counsellor (1818) and Peer of France from 1819.

== Recognition ==
His name is inscribed under the Arc de Triomphe in Paris.

== Sources ==
- Fierro, Alfredo; Palluel-Guillard, André; Tulard, Jean – "Histoire et Dictionnaire du Consulat et de l'Empire", Éditions Robert Laffont, ISBN 2-221-05858-5
- Tulard, Jean – "Dictionnaire Napoléon"; Librairie Artème Fayard, 1999, ISBN 2-213-60485-1
