= Pierre-Charles Lochet =

French general

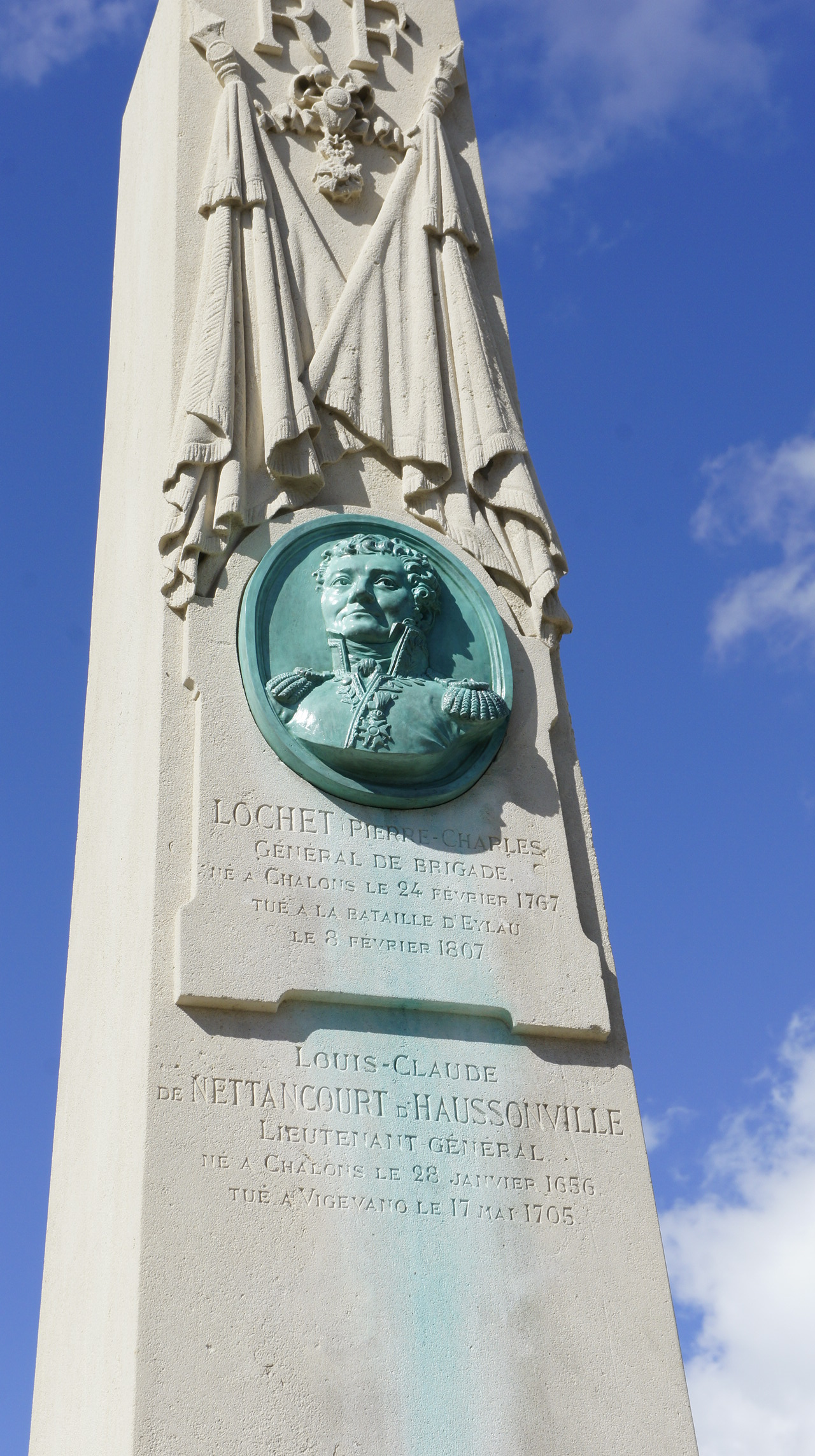
Lochet monument east of Châlons-en-Champagne

Pierre-Charles Lochet (French pronunciation: [pjɛʁ ʃaʁl lɔʃɛ]; 1767–1807) was a brigadier general of the Grande Armée of Napoleon Bonaparte.

Born in Châlons-en-Champagne on 24 February 1767, he was attracted to the profession of arms, and he enlisted in the Queen's regiment in 1784. In 1789, at the outbreak of the French Revolution, he left the Queen's service.

By 1792, he was a captain of the second battalion of volunteers of the Marne. He was promoted to commander of the 94th demi-brigade in 1794. He served in the Army of the Danube in southwestern Germany in 1799 and 1800. In 1803 he was brigadier general. He fought at the Battle of Austerlitz in 1805 at the head of a brigade of the Grand Army, and at the Battle of Jena-Auerstadt the following year.

He was killed by a bullet in the head at the Battle of Eylau on 7 February 1807 and is buried there. His is one of the names inscribed under the Arc de Triomphe.
