= Jean-Martin Petit =

French general

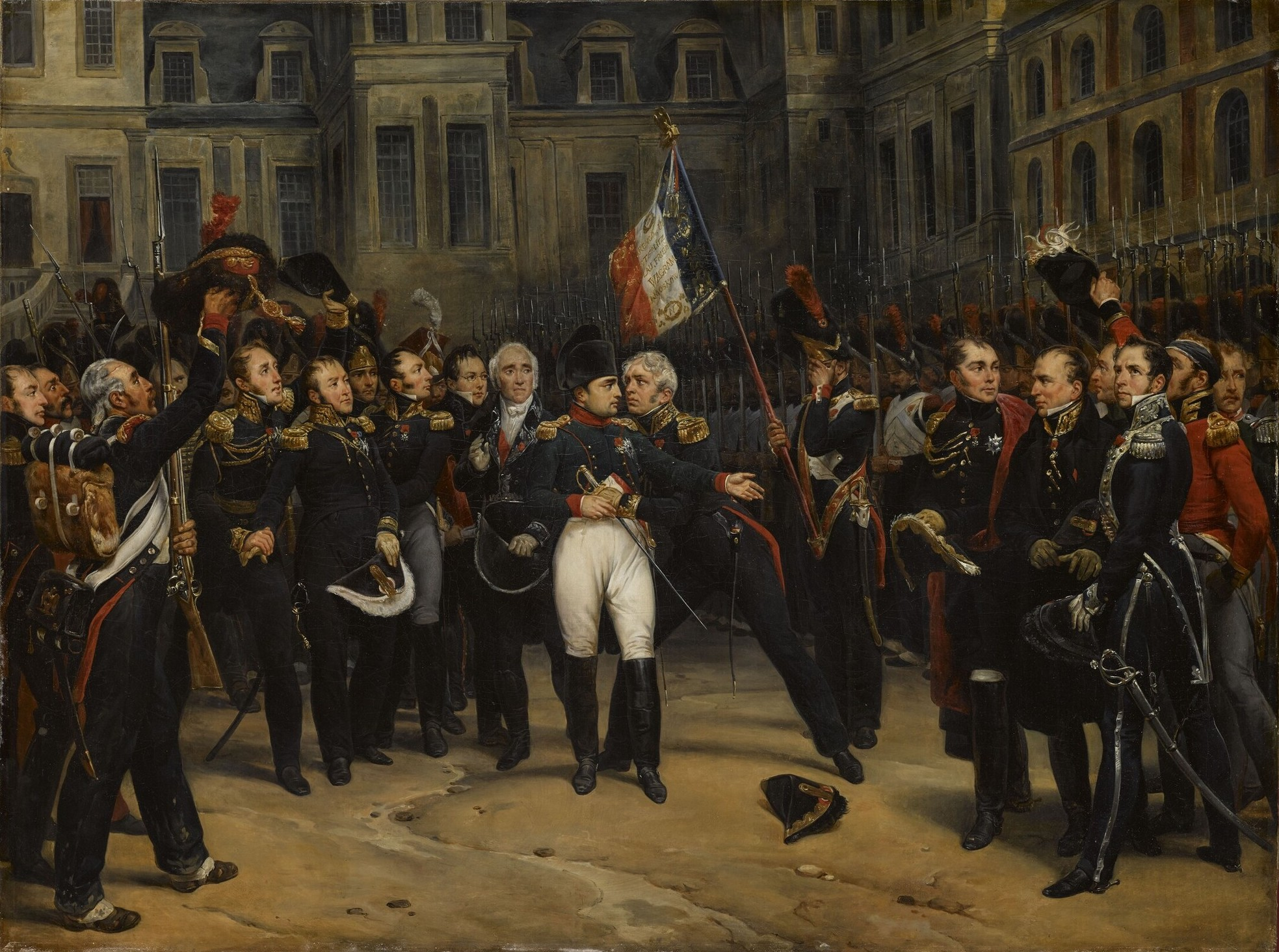
Napoleon's farewell to the Imperial Guard in the Cheval-Blanc (White Horse) courtyard of the Palace of Fontainebleau.

Jean-Martin Petit (French: [ʒɑ̃ maʁtɛ̃ pəti]; 22 July 1772 in Paris – 8 June 1856 in Paris) was a French General during the Napoleonic Wars.

At the time of Napoleon's exile to Elba in 1814, Petit was the commander of the elite Old Guard (France)
