= Battle of Villers-Cotterêts =

Battle of Villers-Cotterêts may refer to:

- Battle of Villers-Cotterêts (1815), a minor battle between Prussians and the French during the Waterloo Campaign of 1815
- Action at Villers-Cotterêts (1914), a minor battle between Germans and the British during the retreat from Mons during 1914
