= Waterloo campaign: Waterloo to Paris (25 June – 1 July) =

Campaign in 1815

- Part of The Waterloo campaign
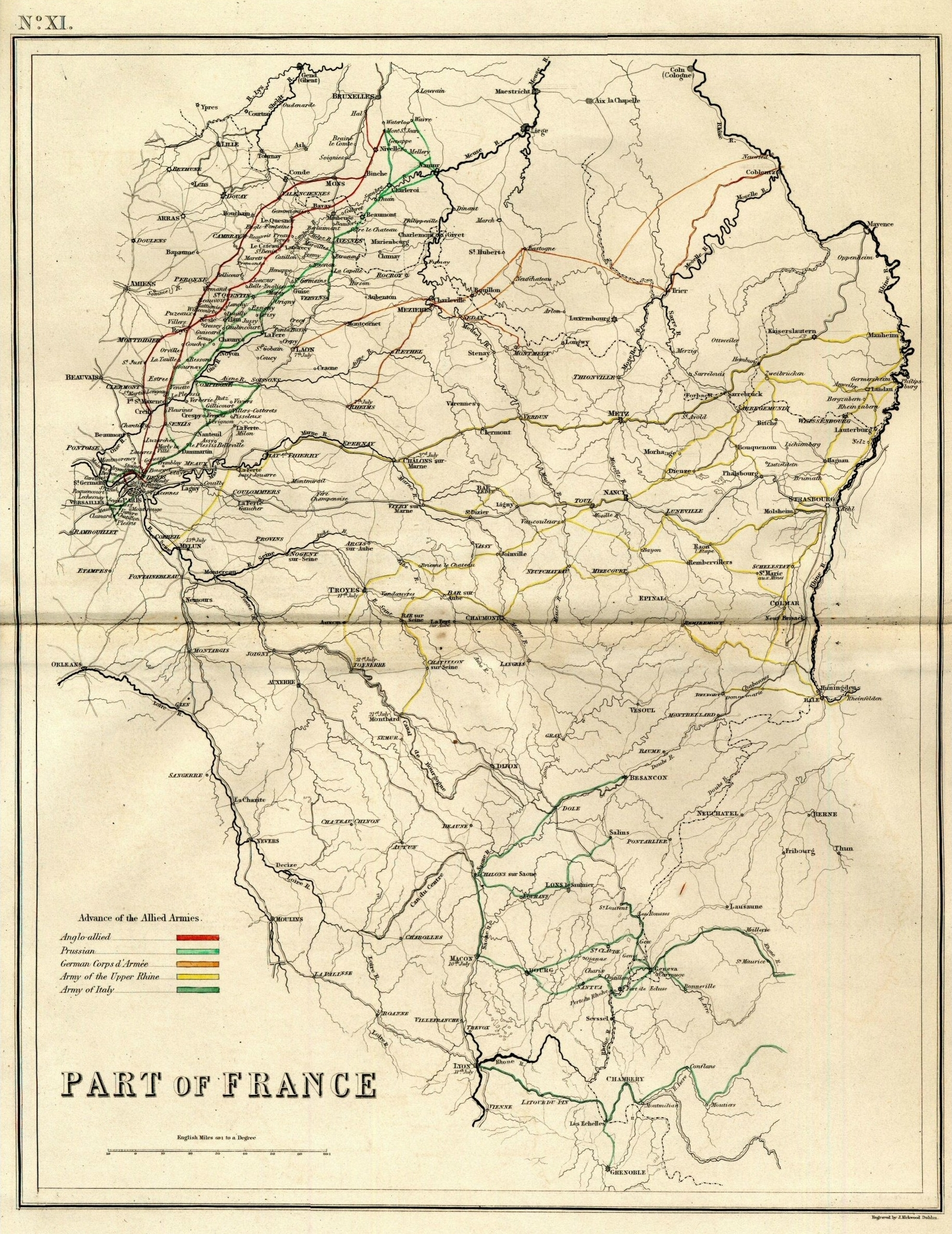
- Part of France engraved by J. Kirkwood, showing the invasion routes of the Seventh Coalition armies in 1815. Red: Anglo-allied army; light green: Prussian Army; orange: North German Federal Army; yellow: Army of the Upper Rhine; dark green: Army of Italy.
Date	25 June – 1 July 1815
Location	From La Belle Alliance (Waterloo) towards Paris,
Result	Paris Falls and Coalition Victory

Belligerents
France	Seventh Coalition: United Kingdom; Netherlands (Kingdom of Hanover) Hanover; Nassau; Brunswick; Prussia

Commanders and leaders
Davout; Marshal Grouchy	Arthur Wellesley, 1st Duke of Wellington; Gebhard Leberecht von Blücher

Strength
117,000	116,000-140,000

After their defeat at the Battle of Waterloo on 18 June 1815, the French Army of the North, under the command of Napoleon Bonaparte retreated in disarray back towards France. As agreed by the two Seventh Coalition commanders in chief, the Duke of Wellington, commander of the Anglo-allied army, and Gebhard Leberecht von Blücher, commander of the Prussian army, the French were to be closely pursued by units of the Prussian army.

During the following week (18–24 June), although the remnants of the main French army were joined by the undefeated right wing of the Army of the North, the French were not given time to reorganise by the Coalition generals and they steadily retreated towards Paris.

By the end Saturday 24 June (the end of the first week after the defeat at Waterloo) the French who had fought at Waterloo were at Laon under the command of Marshal Soult, while those of the right wing who had fought at the simultaneous Battle of Wavre, under the command of Marshal Grouchy, were at Rethel. The Prussians were in and around Aisonville-et-Bernoville with Blücher's headquarters were at Hannapes, and the Anglo-allies were in the vicinity of Cambrai, Englefontaine, and Le Cateau-Cambrésis which is where Wellington had his headquarters.

The next week (25 June – 1 July) would see the French reach Paris with the Coalition forces who were about a days march behind them also arrive in the Paris area. By July 1 the Anglo-allied army were facing the French, who were positioned behind a strong defensive line in the northern suburbs of Paris, while the Prussians had seized two bridges downstream of Paris and had crossed the river Seine and were about to approach Paris from the south west.

In the following week (2–7 July) the French army would capitulate and agree to leave Paris under a ceasefire. The Coalition armies would occupy Paris. On the 8 July the French King Louis XVIII would be restored to the throne, and a new peace treaty would be signed in November of the same year.

== 25 June ==
=== Capitulation of Cambrai and Anglo-Allied movements ===
The fortress and town of Cambrai surrendered to the Anglo-allied army and was handed over to King Louis XVIII. The main body of the Anglo-allied army advanced to Joncourt. The 4th Division continued at Cambrai and the reserve moved on to Maretz.

=== Prussian movements ===
The Prussian I Corps marched on this day from Guise to Cerizy, (Note: Siborne spells this Cérisy) on the road from Saint-Quentin to La Fère. Its vanguard pushed on to Fargniers, near La Fère. An officer and 30 dragoons were detached across the river Oise to cut off the communication between this fortress and Laon, by which means the investment of the place was effected. Along the right bank of the Oise, La Fère was protected by inundations, and no favourable points presented themselves for the establishment of batteries. On this account, preparations were made in the night to cross the river below the place, and gain the heights which command the fortress on the Laon side.

During the march of the vanguard, Major General Jagow, who commanded it, sent a detachment of the 1st Silesian Hussars to Chauny, which communicated by its left, through Saint-Gobain, with Captain Goschitzky in Crépy, and by its left, with the outpost at Jussy of the vanguard of the IV Corps (Bülow). The parties detached on the previous day to Crécy, Pont-à-Bucy, (Note: Pont-à-Bucy (49.69019°N 3.48514°E)) and along the river Serre, were now called in.

The Prussian III Corps (Thielmann's) marched from Nouviou to Homblières and its vicinity. Two of its brigades occupied passages across the Oise, namely, the 9th at Origny, and the 12th at Neuvillette. The 11th Brigade bivouacked at Marcy, and the 10th at Homblières and Mesnil-Saint-Laurent. The detachments sent out from this corps on the previous day towards the road leading from Charleville-Mézières to Laon, brought in word that at 11:00 on 24 June, the French troops had abandoned Aubenton, and marched off to Montcornet; (Note: Siborne spells this town Monternet in his text but Montcornet on the map) also that Grouchy's army had reached Rocroi on 23 June, and Rethel on 24 June; and it was presumed that his next march was to be on Soissons. On the receipt of this intelligence these detachments were drawn back, and their observation limited to the ground nearest to the left bank of the Oise.

The vanguard of the Prussian IV Corps was closely followed by the reserve cavalry, and all these troops were placed under the command of Prince William of Prussia. The cavalry marched along the road leading to Chauny, as far as Montescourt, where it bivouacked. The main body of the corps reached Essigny-le-Grand.

=== Politics and Blücher military plans ===
At Saint-Quentin, Blücher received a letter from Laon addressed to the Coalition commanders by the French Commissioners sent from the two Chambers of the French National Assembly; in which they communicated the fact of Napoleon's abdication, and of the elevation of his son to the throne (as Napoleon II), and stated that they had been deputed by the Provisional Government to negotiate an armistice.

To this Blücher replied verbally, by an aide de camp, that he would suspend hostilities on arriving at Paris, provided Bonaparte was given up to him, and several Fortresses on the frontiers delivered up as sureties; and provided, also, that the Duke of Wellington should agree to what might be proposed.

According to the accounts which were this day received from Lieutenant Colonel Schmiedeberg it was presumed that the French were still at Laon. The reports from the detachments of the III Corps also confirmed this view, and intimated that Grouchy's troops were yet two marches distant from Laon. This intelligence, combined with the attempts made by the French to induce the Coalition generals to enter into negotiations, clearly showed the importance of endeavouring, by means of a forced march, to gain the passages of the Oise, and then to intercept the French line of retreat by Soissons upon Paris.

In the night of 25 June, however, information was received that the French army had marched from Laon to Soissons, a fact from which it was naturally concluded that the French were no longer deceived as to the advance of the Prussians towards Laon; and that the French were therefore bent upon effecting a further retreat, or, perhaps, even of anticipating the Prussian movements towards the Oise, and detaching a blocking force towards Compiègne. Hence, not a moment was now to be lost by the Prussians in securing the points of passage, particularly that at Compiègne (for Blücher, to keep up the momentum of his advance, the seizure Compiègne and its bridge was an important tactical consideration because his army had no pontoons and the British pontoon train was far behind, and so was not immediately available). Blücher decided upon moving his left column (the I and III Corps) on Compiègne, and his right column (the IV Corps) upon Pont-Sainte-Maxence; the latter to secure the passage both at this place, and at Creil lower down the Oise.

=== French movements ===
Marshal Soult, who had been indefatigable in collecting at Laon the remains of the defeated portion of the French army, marched the latter, on 25 June, to Soissons; where it was to be joined by the force under the command of Marshal Grouchy. Grouchy, who, having preceded his troops which were yet a march and a half distant, had arrived in that town, to take the command of the whole army, according to instructions conveyed to him from the Provisional Government. Soult, as soon as he found himself thus superseded in the command, resigned from the army, and left for Paris; disgusted with the abrupt and discourteous manner with which he had been treated.

Napoleon withdrew from Paris to the country Palace of Malmaison. From there he issued a final address to the French army.

=== Armies dispositions evening 25 June ===
The position of the respective armies, on the evening of 25 June, were as follows:

The Prussian I Corps was at Cerisy; the 3rd at Homblieres; and the 4th at Essigny-le-Grand. Blücher's headquarters were at Saint-Quentin.

The Anglo-allied army:

- The vanguard, 6th Brigade (Vivian's), was at Crisour, near Saint-Quentin.
- The 2nd Division, the Nassau troops, and the British cavalry, were encamped in the vicinity of Joncourt.
- The 1st and 3rd divisions, the Dutch-Belgian infantry attached to the 1st Corps, and the Dutch-Belgian cavalry, were encamped near Serain and Prémont.
- The 4th Division, with Grants's Light Cavalry Brigade, was at Cambrai.
- The 5th and 6th Divisions, the Brunswick infantry and cavalry, and the reserve artillery, were encamped at, and in the vicinity of, Maretz.
- Wellington's headquarters were at Joncourt.

The right wing of the French army, led by Vandamme, was at Rheims; the left, with Grouchey, at Soissons.

== 26 June ==
=== Wellington's Army ===
On 26 June, Wellington marched the main body of his army to Vermand and its vicinity.

==== Surrender of Péronne ====
Major General Sir John Byng, who was now in command of Anglo-allied I Corps, having heard, on passing Vermand, that Wellington was there, immediately visited Wellington. On receiving him, Wellington said, "You are the very person I wish to see — I want you to take Péronne. You may as well take with you a Brigade of Guards, and a Dutch-Belgian brigade. I shall be there almost as soon as yourself". Byng proceed to carry out his orders and issued his own for 1st Brigade (Maitland's), and a Dutch-Belgian Brigade of Chassé's Division attached to his corps, to proceed towards Péronne.

Wellington, on reaching Péronne just as those troops arrived there, summoned the garrison to surrender, and then proceeded, in person, to reconnoitre that fortress. Perceiving the possibility of taking it by storm, gave orders to prepare for an assault. Wellington then directed the attack to be made upon the hornwork which covered the suburb on the left of the Somme. Lieutenant Colonel Lord Saltoun immediately led on the light troops of Maitland's Brigade, stormed, and carried the outwork, with but little loss; on observing which, Wellington, being satisfied the place would prove an easy capture, returned to Vermand.

Some pieces of Dutch artillery were now brought into the hornwork, and a cannonade was opened upon the town; but the fire kept up on both sides was trifling, and of short duration: for Byng having sent forward his Acting Assistant Quartermaster General, Lieutenant-Colonel James Stanhope, with a white flag, the civil authorities interfered, and urged the garrison to capitulate; whereupon the maiden fortress of Péronne surrendered on the condition that its defenders, some 1,500 National Guard, should lay down their arms, and be allowed to repair to their homes.

Major General Byng, on returning to Vermand, to report the capture of the fortress to Wellington, met the Dutch-Belgian Brigade, which had been ordered to move to Péronne at the same time as the Guards, about halfway towards that place!

==== Other movements ====
The 4th Division (Colville's) rejoined the main body of Wellington's army, as Cambrai had been handed over to the troops of the King of France, under the Charles, Duke of Berry. The reserve moved on to Bellicourt and Bellenglise.

==== Wellington's reply to the French Commissioners: No suspension of hostilities ====
Upon returning in the night to his headquarters at Vermand, Wellington found a note from Blücher, forwarding to him the letter had received the French Commissioners on 25 June, and to which Wellington replied immediately that he could not consent to the suspension of hostilities until the French army laid down its arms.

=== Blücher's army ===
From the moment that Blücher had become aware of the retirement of the French troops from Laon upon Soissons, he was most anxious to secure the passage across the Oise at Compiègne, Verberie, Pont-Sainte-Maxence, and Creil.

In the middle of the night of 25 June, Blücher therefore sent an order for the vanguard of the Prussian I Corps to proceed on the following day, from Fargnieres, by forced march, as far as Compiègne. In the afternoon of 26 June, the Corps reached Noyon, where it halted for a rest, having marched 24 kilometres (15 mi): and having nearly an equal distance before it to Compiègne. The twelve pounder battery and the four ten pounder howitzers which had been attached to this vanguard (the 3rd Brigade under Major General Jagow) were, by Zieten's order, left under the protection of a battalion, to be employed with the 1st Brigade, which was directed to make an attempt upon the Fortress of La Fère. The vanguard after having sent on a squadron of the 1st Silesian Hussars, under Major Hertel, to Compiègne, with orders to push forward a detachment thence upon the road to Soissons, resumed its march in the evening.

It was still in movement about midnight on 26 June, when Major General Jagow received a communication from the front that Major Hertel had, with his squadron, entered Compiègne at 20:00; and had learned from the Mayor that a French corps was on the march from Soissons to that town, in which it had already bespoken ten thousand rations. Jagow immediately communicated this important information to Zieten, and ordered his troops, after another short but indispensable halt, to continue their toilsome march.

On the morning of 26 June, the 1st Brigade of Zieten's Corps completed the investment of La Fère. The troops that had been previously detached to this point by General Jagow were moved off to follow this Officer's brigade on the road to Compiègne. Notwithstanding the vigorous bombardment which the Prussians maintained against the Fortress until noon, and by which several buildings were set on fire, they failed to induce the garrison to surrender.

As it was not intended, however, to attempt any more serious attack: the brigade, after leaving the Fusilier Battalion of the 12th Regiment and a squadron of the Brandenburg Uhlans to watch the fortress, followed the corps, which had marched to Noyon; but it did not even reach Chauny, scarcely 11 kilometres (7 mi) from La Fère.

Zieten, on arriving at Chauny at 20:00, with the remainder of his corps — the 2nd and 4th brigades, the reserve artillery, and a reserve cavalry brigade — considered his troops much too fatigued to fulfil Blücher's intentions that they should march as far as Noyon; and he therefore ordered them to bivouac at Chauny.

The Prussian III Corps (Thielmann's) marched from the vicinity of Homblieres to that of Guiscard; partly by Jussy, and partly by Saint-Quentin and Ham. It was only the 11th Brigade, with the greater portion of the reserve cavalry and artillery, that took the latter road. These troops on reaching the fortified town of Ham, found it occupied by the French; who seemed prepared to oppose their passing through the place. Major General Hobe, who commanded them, summoned the commander of the garrison to open the gates and allow the troops to march through; and on perceiving that this summons was disobeyed, he tried the effect of a few cannon shot, which quickly procured a free passage for his force. No further notice was taken, and no further use was made, by the Prussians of this otherwise insignificant place.

A detachment of the reserve cavalry of this corps was sent to Chauny, from which it pushed forward a small party along the road towards Soissons, which the latter pursued until on arriving at about 4.8 kilometres (3 mi) beyond Coucy, it came upon French outpost, consisting of a regiment of dragoons and a battalion of infantry.

The IV Corps was also required to make a forced march on the 26 June — namely, from Essigny-le-Grand as far as Lassigny, and its vanguard was to reach Gournay-sur-Aronde, and thence push forward detachments to Clermont, Creil, and Pont-Sainte-Maxence, for the purpose of securing and examining the bridges across the river Oise, and of preparing all that was requisite for effecting a passage for the troops. Bülow, in his brigade orders, drew the attention of his troops to the necessity which had arisen for those forced marches on the part of the Prussian army with a view to obtain a decisive result.

The vanguard started at 04:00 from Jussy, and proceeded by Lassigny to Gournay-sur-Aronde, situated upon the road from Péronne to Pont-Sainte-Maxence; but the detachments which it sent thence towards Clermont, Creil, Pont-Sainte-Maxence, and Verberie, did not reach those places until the following day. The reserve artillery of the IV Corps commenced its march at 05:00, following the vanguard, and reached Ressons-sur-Matz late in the evening; (Note: Siborne calls it Ressons so they could have been at La Neuville-sur-Ressons.) where it bivouacked, as did also, subsequently, the main body of the corps, after a march of about 40 kilometres (25 mi).

=== French movements ===
Whilst the Prussians were, on 26 June, hastening towards Compiègne; the French General, Count d'Erlon, was, also marching upon that point from Soissons, with the remains of his Corps — about 4,000 men — having succeeded, through his urgent representations of the expediency of such a movement, in obtaining Grouchy's assent to its execution.

The troops of the French III and IV corps moved this day from Rheims towards Soissons, a distance which they could not, however, accomplish in one day's march.

=== Positions on evening 26 June ===
The positions of the respective armies on the evening of 26 June were as follows:

Prussian army:

- The 2nd and 4th brigades of the Prussian I Corps were at Chauny, not far from which was also the 1st Brigade. The 3rd Brigade, forming the vanguard, was on the march to Compiègne.
- The III Corps was at Guiscard.
- The IV Corps was at Ressons-sur-Matz.
- Blücher's headquarters were at Genvry, near Noyon.

Anglo-allied army:

- The vanguard, 6th Cavalry Brigade (Vivian's), was at Matigny, (Note: Siborne calls it Mattignies.) near the Somme, having its pickets on that river.
- The 2nd Division, the Nassau troops, and the British Cavalry, were encamped near Beauvois-en-Vermandois and Lanchy.
- The 1st and 3rd divisions, the Dutch-Belgian infantry attached to the I Corps, and the Dutch-Belgian Cavalry, were encamped near Caulaincourt and Trefcon (Note: Siborne calls the location "Martin de des Prés", which is now a ruin.)
- The 4th Division was encamped at Gouy. (Note: Siborne spells the location Gouay)
- The First British Brigade of Guards was at Péronne.
- The Reserve, consisting of the 5th and 6th divisions, the Brunswick troops, and the reserve artillery was encamped near Nauroy, Magny-la-Fosse, and Bellenglise. (Note: Siborne names them Nourois, Magny and Bellenglise.)
- The Pontoon Train was at Estrées.
- Wellington's headquarters were at Vermand.

French army:

- The French troops under d'Erlon were not far from Compiègne, on the road from Soissons.
- The III and IV Corps, under Vandamme, were at some point between Rheims and Soissons.
- Grouchy's headquarters were at Soissons.

== 27 June ==
=== Prussian left column ===
==== Skirmish at Compiègne ====
It was 04:30 on 27 June, when the vanguard of the Prussian Corps (the 3rd Brigade), after a forced march of about 40 kilometres (25 mi), reached Compiègne. General Jagow immediately posted his troops, in the most advantageous manner, in and about the town, so as to be prepared to meet any attack that the French might make; and detached three squadrons of the 1st Silesian Hussars upon the Soissons road, and the remaining squadron upon the Paris road, in observation.

About 05:00, by which time he had scarcely completed his arrangements, information reached him from the Hussars on the Soissons road that the French were advancing. This was, as before remarked, d'Erlon, with the remains of his corps; from which circumstance it will be seen that if Zieten's vanguard had arrived but a single half hour later, the French would have anticipated the Prussians in securing the bridge at Compiègne.

From along the edge of the extensive wood which adjoined Compiègne, French skirmishers started to fire at the Prussian pickets. Very shortly afterwards a column of infantry appeared advancing from their rear. A half battery of Prussian horse artillery, which had been posted on the Soissons road, in front of the gate on that side of the town, having allowed the column to approach within a suitable range, directed a fire upon it with such vigour and precision, that in a few moments more the mass rushed for shelter into the wood. Four French guns were now brought forward, and these replied to the Prussian artillery; during which the French moved through the wood on their left. The Prussians concluded from this movement that d'Erlon contemplated abandoning the attack in this quarter, for the purpose of assailing the lower and weaker side of the town, by the Crépy-en-Valois and Paris roads; but on renewing his advance, d'Erlon soon showed that he was only masking his retreat; whereupon the 1st Silesian Hussars advanced along the road to Soissons in pursuit.

By the result of this action, which lasted an hour and a half but was limited to a cannonade and mutual tiraillade, the French were foiled in their attempt to cover their retreat by securing Compiègne, and checking the advance of the Prussians along the river Oise.

==== Aftermath of the skirmish at Compiègne ====
The 3rd Prussian Brigade, however, which had continually formed the vanguard of the I Corps since the Battle of Waterloo, was too much exhausted by its efforts during the previous day and night, to attempt seriously to molest the d'Erlon Corps during its retreat; a circumstance of which the latter failed not to take advantage. Zieten decided upon relieving these troops from the duties of a vanguard by the 2nd Brigade; which, however, had not yet come up: and hence the French gained some valuable time. The main body of Zieten's Corps did not reach Compiègne until midday.

Blücher, who had already arrived at Compiègne, ordered that the vanguard (now consisting of the 2nd Brigade) and the reserve cavalry, preceded by one hundred riflemen, should march through the wood towards Villers-Cotterêts, followed by the main body of the I Corps; it having been his intention to throw these troops upon the French line of retreat, in the event of the vanguard falling in with French troops at or near that point.

This order, however, was not strictly followed by Zieten, who marched the main body of his Corps, including the reserve cavalry, and the reserve artillery, through the Forest of Compiègne to Gilocourt, (Note: Siborne spells it Gilocourt) detaching only his 2nd Brigade, reinforced by the Brandenburg Dragoons and five pieces of horse artillery, towards Villers-Cotterêts. The 1st Silesian Hussars were pushed forward upon the road from Compiègne to Soissons, to cover the left flank during this movement.

The Prussian reserve cavalry, in front of the column of the main body, reached Gilocourt just as the French (under Count d'Erlon) had crossed the defile formed by a tributary stream of the Oise in which that place is situated. The 1st West Prussian Dragoons and the Brandenburg Uhlans, together with a horse battery, went on in pursuit; and the 3rd Brigade was ordered to follow the latter in support, while the 4th Brigade was directed to protect the defile of Gilocourt against any French counterattack.

==== Skirmish at Crépy-en-Valois ====
The French rearguard was overtaken on the Gilocourt side of Crépy-en-Valois (Note: Silborne calls the town Crespy) by the two Prussian regiments of cavalry, which threw it back in disorder upon that town. The French quickly retired from that place; whereupon the Prussian 3rd Brigade, with a cavalry brigade, bivouacked there, throwing out parties of dragoons in the direction of the retreating French.

==== Aftermath of the skirmish at Crépy-en-Valois ====
The Prussian 4th Brigade, the other cavalry brigade, and the reserve artillery, bivouacked at Gilocourt. The 2nd Brigade, with the additional force attached to it, as before mentioned, reached Longpré, not far from Villers-Cotterêts, in the middle of the night. The long march which the troops of the I Corps made this day from Noyon, and the probability of their coming into collision with the French on the following day, rendered a few hours' rest absolutely necessary.

Separated from one another as Zieten's brigades thus were, a strong support was essentially requisite; and this was supplied in good time by the Prussian III Corps which marched on this day from Guiscard to Compiègne. Blücher directed its commander, Thielmann, to detach strongly towards Soissons; for the purpose of observing the French, and of molesting them should they be retiring. The cavalry thus detached presenting the means of covering Ziten's left flank; the 1st Silesian Hussars, which had been previously posted on the Soissons road, were directed to rejoin their own Corps. The III Corps bivouacked on the left bank of the Oise, with the exception of the 12th Brigade which remained on the right bank at Venette.

=== Prussian right column ===
==== Skirmish at Creil ====
On the same day, the Prussian IV Corps forming the right column, marched from Ressons-sur-Matz. and its vicinity, with orders to cross the Oise lower down the stream, at Verberie, Pont-Sainte-Maxenc, or Creil. Bülow formed his vanguard with the 3rd Neumark Landwehr, a battalion of the 1st Silesian Landwehr, the 8th Hussars, the 1st Pomeranian Landwehr Cavalry, and half the Horse Battery No. 12, and desired General Sydow, who commanded the vanguard, to move off with a detachment, at the first break of day, and secure the bridge over the Oise at Creil.

Sydow, aware of the importance of attaining the object in view, proceeded himself, at the head of a squadron of the 8th Hussars, and of one hundred infantry, the latter being transported in carts, and reached Creil with his small detachment just as the French were on the point of entering the place. The latter were immediately attacked and repulsed: and the Prussian infantry occupied the bridge; which, on the arrival of the vanguard, was given over to the 1st Silesian Landwehr, whilst the remainder of the troops, after a short halt, commenced their march upon Senlis.

The historian William Selborn mentions that as with the Prussians, on the same morning, reached the bridge at Compiègne, only half an hour before the French approached it; had the Prussians arrived at Creil but a few minutes later, they would have found the French in possession of the bridge at this point and that these are good examples of the great importance of a correct calculation of time in military operations.

==== Skirmish at Senlis ====
Major Blankenburg was detached in advance, with the 1st Pomeranian Landwehr Cavalry, from Creil towards Senlis. They had but just reached this town, and had begun to bivouac on the great market place; when, towards 21:00, Kellermann, with the 1st Cuirassier Brigade (Blanchard's) of French cavalry, approached on the opposite side, and made a dash at the very spot occupied by the Prussians. Major Blankenburg had barely time to mount; nevertheless, with such of his men as were accoutred and prepared, he attacked the French horsemen, and drove them back to the gates of the town. The latter, however, collecting their strength, renewed their attack, overpowered the Prussians; and forced them to retire along the road to Pont-Sainte-Maxence. Kellermann's Brigade then resumed its march along the prescribed line of retreat.

In the meantime, his 2nd Cuirassier Brigade, and d'Erlon's French Corps, were retiring along the same road towards Senlis.

Upon this point also General Sydow was moving from Creil, with the vanguard of the Prussian IV Corps; following, as it was supposed, the detached 1st Pomeranian Landwehr Cavalry. On reaching Senlis at 22:00, with the head of the column, consisting of the 8th Hussars and the 3rd Battalion of the 3rd Neumark Landwehr, and finding the place unoccupied, he took possession of it. The French troops had already approached close to the town, from the side of Crépy-en-Valois. The Prussian infantry were immediately posted in the houses nearest to the gate: and as soon as the French cavalry came fully within the effective range of musketry, they suddenly opened upon the latter a sharp fire; which compelled the French to go about.

The head of d'Erlon's Corps now came up; but was forced, along with the cavalry, to take another direction. Sybow, having collected the whole of the vanguard, followed the French some little distance; and bivouacked, about midnight, somewhat in advance of Senlis. The latter, however, reached, next morning, the road leading through Gonesse to Paris.

==== Blücher secures the line of the Oise ====
During the operation of the vanguard of the Prussian IV Corps, another detachment was sent to occupy Pont-Sainte-Maxence and Verberie. The French having partially destroyed the bridge at Pont-Sainte-Maxence, the 2nd Pomeranian Landwehr Cavalry were ferried to the opposite bank of the river, and detachments were immediately pushed on to Verberie and Senlis. The 14th Brigade was also ferried across and occupied the heights on both sides of the great Paris road. These troops bivouacked for the night on their position; whilst the main body of the IV Corps on reaching Pont-Sainte-Maxence, remained on the right bank of the river. The greatest activity was used in repairing the bridge sufficiently for the passage of artillery.

In this manner Blücher had secured the line of the Oise, and, by pushing forward his advanced troops as far as Villers-Cotterêts, had closed so much upon the flank of the retiring French, that he had every reasonable expectation of succeeding in cutting off the line of retreat of the latter upon Paris.

==== Feebleness of French resistance ====
Grouchy, on discovering that the detachments he had thrown out to gain the passages of the Oise, on his right, had been thwarted by the rapidity of the Prussian movement, and had been compelled to fall-back, now employed them in covering his retreat by means of partial combats. Hence arose the engagements at Compiègne, Crépy-en-Valois, and Senlis; but such was the feebleness of the French resistance, and so frequent were the desertions of the soldiers, who threw away their arms, and fled to their homes, that it was evident the reorganisation of the army, and the reanimation of its former spirit, were far from having been thoroughly effected.

It has been said that a cry of alarm spread through its ranks of, "Our retreat is cut off!" as soon as it was known that the Prussians were upon its right flank. At all events it appears tolerably certain that the French army was not in that state which would have warranted Grouchy in risking any serious stand against the Prussians. To succeed in reaching the capital by means of forced marches; and to secure his troops, as far as practicable, from molestation, was all that he could hope to accomplish.

=== Anglo-allied army crosses the Somme ===
On 27 June, the main body of the Anglo-allied army, crossing the Somme at Villecourt, (Note: Silborne calls it Willecourt (as does Wellington in his dispatches).) marched through Nesle upon Roye.

The 4th Division (Colville's) marched through Péronne, towards Roye.

Two battalions of the Dutch-Belgian Brigade at Péronne were ordered to remain in occupation of that place: the remainder of the brigade, and the Brigade of Guards at Péronne, marched through Nesle to the village of Cressy-Omencourt, and joined the I Corps.

The 5th Division, the Brunswick Cavalry, and the reserve brigade of howitzers, moved upon Ham.

The 6th Division, the Brunswick infantry, and the reserve artillery, encamped between the villages of Douilly and Villers-le-Sec.

=== Pillaging by some Dutch-Belgian troops ===
Notwithstanding the precautions which Wellington had taken to ensure the orderly conduct of his troops (see Wellington's General order of 20 June and his Malplaquet proclamation two days later), and to conciliate in their favour the good disposition of the inhabitants along the line of march, it being his anxious desire that they should be considered as being on a friendly footing, and as acting on behalf of the legitimate French sovereign, there was one portion of his army which committed the greatest excesses: these were some of the Dutch-Belgian troops, who ignored his orders. They pillaged wherever they went, not even excepting Wellington's headquarters, including the house which he occupied! They forced the safeguards, and rescued, at the point of the bayonet, the prisoners from the Gendarmerie which the Wellington had formed for the police of the Anglo-allied army.

Two officers participated in this disorder and actively encouraged others to do the same. This drew Wellington's ire and severe censure. He desired the General Officer then in command of that part of the army to put in full force his general order of the 26 June, to cause a roll call of companies to be made every hour, and to see that every officer and soldier was present.

The two Officers were arrested, and sent to the Hague, to be censured of by King William I of the Netherlands; to whom he forwarded a copy of the letter containing these instructions. This letter, which strongly evidenced the feelings of annoyance, under which Wellington wrote it, concluding with the following reproof:

I do not want to command such officers. I am experienced enough to know the difference between soldier and raiders, and those who encourage them are worthless before the enemy; and I do not want it. (Note: Wellington wrote in French (the Lingua franca of the era) "Je ne veux pas commander de tels Officiers. Je suis assez longtemps Soldat pour savoir gue les Pillards, et ceux qui les encouragent, ne valent rien devant l'Ennemi; et je n'en veux pas.")

=== Bivouacs on the evening of the 27 June ===
The following were the positions of the respective armies on the evening of 27 June:

Prussian army:

- The main body of the I Corps had its main body at Gilocourt; its 2nd Brigade at Longpré about 5 kilometres (3.1 mi) from Villers-Cotterêts; and its 3rd Brigade at Crépy-en-Valois.
- The main body of the III Corps was at Compiègne; it had strong detachments in the direction of Soissons.
- The main body of the IV Corps was at Pont-Sainte-Maxence; it had its vanguard at Senlis, and detachments at Creil and Verberie.
- Blücher's headquarters were at Compiègne.

Anglo-allied army:

- The 2nd Division, the Nassau troops, and the British and Hanoverian Cavalry, were in the vicinity of Roye.
- The 3rd Division, one brigade of the 1st Division, the Dutch-Belgian infantry attached to the I Corps, and the Dutch-Belgian cavalry, were encamped near the villages of Cressy-Omencourt, Billancourt, and Breuil. (Note: Silborne spells it Bereuil.)
- The 4th Division was at the village of Puzeaux, on the road to Roye.
- The Brigade of Guards was at Cressy-Omencourt.
- The 5th Division and the Brunswick Cavalry were at Ham.
- The 6th Division, the Brunswick Infantry, the reserve artillery, were between the villages of Douilly and Villers-Saint-Christophe. (Note: Villers-Saint-Christophe is called Villers by Siborne and is less than 3 kilometres (1.9 mi) away. However the only Villers shown on Siborne's map in this vicinity is Villers-lès-Roye, but this is too far away (about 25 kilometres (16 mi)).)
- Wellington's headquarters were at Nesle.

French army:

- The remains of the I and II Corps, detachments from which had this day been defeated at Compiègne, Crépy-en-Valois, Creil, and Senlis, were in full retreat, partly upon the Senlis, and partly upon the Soissons, road.
- The Imperial Guard (Drouot's) and the VI Corps (Mouton's) were at Villers-Cotterêts.
- The III and IV Corps were at Soissons.
- Grouchy's headquarters were at Villers-Cotterêts.

== 28 June ==
=== Battle of Villers-Cotterêts ===
==== Prussian surprise night attack ====
General Pirch II having learned, upon his arrival at 01:00 on 28 June, with the vanguard of the Prussian I Corps at Longpré, near Villers-Cotterêts, that the latter place was not occupied by the French in any force, determined to capture the place forthwith by a surprise. The troops detached to the front on this service (the Fusilier Battalion of the 6th Regiment and the Brandenburg Dragoons), favoured by the darkness (which as yet was scarcely relieved by the approaching dawn), as also by the wood through which they advanced, fell upon a detachment that was moving by a by road through the wood, consisting of a French horse battery of fourteen guns, twenty ammunition wagons, and an escort of one hundred and fifty men.

The whole vicinity of Villers-Cotterêts was, in fact, filled with French troops; thus dispersed, that they might sooner obtain refreshment after the long march, and be prepared to start again at 02:00. Thus they were all in motion at the time of this capture.

General Pirch now pushed on to Villers-Cotterêts, where the Prussians took many prisoners. Grouchy himself narrowly escaped being taken as he was mounting his horse and hastening out of the opposite side of the town. On reaching the Windmill Heights upon the road to Nanteuil, he succeeded in collecting together and forming his troops.

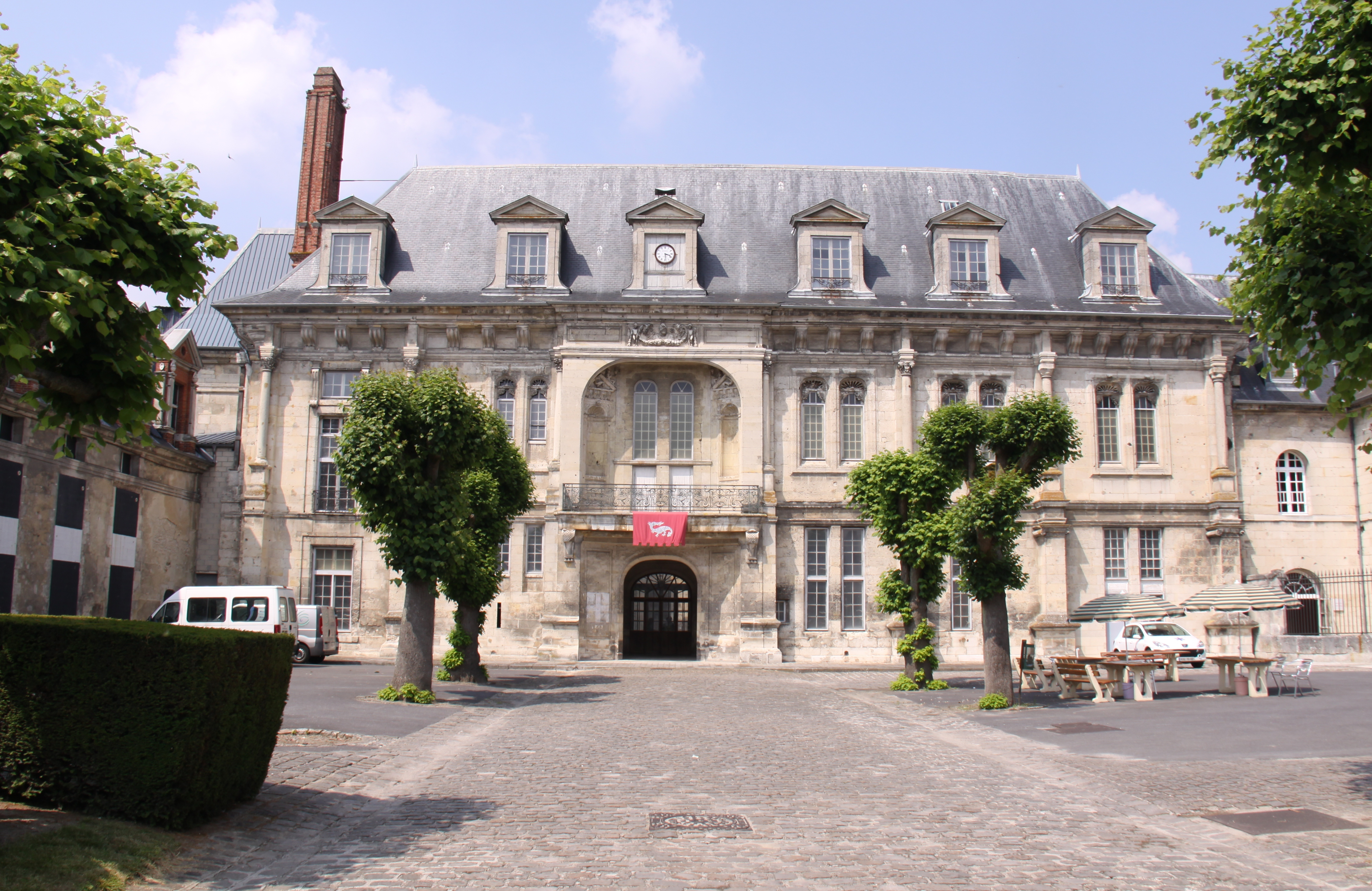
Château de Villers-Cotterêts, Prussian infantry was posted in the garden during the action.

Pirch, after detaching cavalry in pursuit of the French, as also towards Longpré to cover his right, and towards Soissons to protect his left, took up a defensive position. He deployed his infantry, with the foot battery, upon the height at the garden of the Château de Villers-Cotterêts, posted two battalions at the point of a wood that jutted out on his right.

==== French counter attack ====
Pirch II was still occupied in making his arrangements, when a cavalry detachment, on the Soissons road, sent in word that a hostile corps was to be seen approaching from Soissons. Another report was received immediately afterwards, that the French showed much cavalry on that side, and was already detaching two regiments of cavalry towards the Prussian left flank; as also another cavalry force, along with from twenty to twenty five pieces of artillery against the right flank.

In the meantime, Marshal Grouchy had collected about 9,000 Frenchmen on the Windmill Heights, near the road to Nanteuil; one third of whom had already constituted the rearguard, and the remainder was composed of troops that had halted during the night in the vicinity, as at Vauciennes, Coyolles, and Pisseleux. With these troops. Grouchy showed every disposition to accept an engagement.

General Pirch II, finding himself thus critically situated between two separate and overpowering hostile forces, prepared to effect his retreat.

This was facilitated in a peculiar manner. The troops of French III Corps (Vandamme's), perceiving the Prussians thus posted on the high road to Paris, and imagining their force to be greater than it really was, fell into the greatest disorder, and with loud cries of "Into the woods on the left, towards La Ferté-Milon — we are cut off from Paris!" most of them rushed in that direction; with the exception of 2,000 men and some guns conducted by Vandamme himself by the way of Pisseleux, leaving Villers-Cotterêts on their right, and masking the movement by a vigorous attack upon this place. The 6th Prussian Regiment was driven back by the superior numbers of the French; and Pirch, after having kept up a brisk cannonade, gradually withdrew the Regiment from Villers-Cotterêts, for the purpose of moving upon Crépy-en-Valois, the direction previously laid down for him, with a view to the concentration of the corps.

=== Prussian I Corps advances by Lévignen towards Nanteuil ===
As Grouchy was moving by the Soissons road towards Nanteuil, Pirch II, the commander of the Prussian 2nd Brigade, was desirous of proceeding in a parallel direction, through Longpré: but he was subsequently induced, on consideration of the defiles in that direction, and which he did not deem it prudent to pass so near to the French, to prefer retiring along the Compiègne road, as far as where it is joined by the one leading from Vivières; and where, for the covering of the left flank and rear, a squadron of the Brandenburg Dragoons had already been posted.

From this point Pirch II struck into the road leading by Buts, (Note: Siborne calls it Buts, and it must have been hamlet, possibly Buy at 49.28718°N 2.95855°E) and reached, towards midday, Fresnoy-la-Rivière, where he gave his troops a few hours' rest; and then proceeded by Crépy-en-Valois to Nanteuil, which place he reached about 21:00, having marched 101 kilometres (63 mi) within the last thirty eight hours, during six of which he had also been engaged with the French. He had succeeded in creating confusion in one portion of the retiring French force, and in impeding the retreat of that which was with Grouchy himself sufficiently long to enable Zieten to anticipate the latter in his arrival at Nanteuil.

During the 27 June the brigades of the Prussian I Corps had become separated. The 1st (Steinmetz's) was still on the march from La Fère (it rejoined on the afternoon of this day); the 2nd (Pirch II's), with the Brandenburg Dragoons, was near Villers-Cotterêts; the 3rd (Jagow's), with a cavalry brigade, was at Crépy-en-Valois; and the 4th (Donnersmarck's), with the other cavalry brigade was at Gilocourt. Hence Zieten was desirous, on the morning of the 28 June, to concentrate his corps at Crépy-en-Valois; leaving only a strong cavalry detachment at Villers-Cotterêts. But while despatching the order to Pirch II to move to Crépy-en-Valois; he received a report from this General, that he had fallen upon the French troops retreating through Villers-Cotterêts, and was upon the point of being driven back by superior numbers.

Zieten, considering that the Prussian troops at Crépy-en-Valois, the nearest to Villers-Cotterêts, were nearly 14 kilometres (9 mi) distant from the latter point, decided upon not attempting to give any direct support to Pirch II; but to advance with the 3rd Brigade, together with the reserve cavalry and artillery, towards Lévignen, (Note: Siborne spells it Levignon.) on the great Paris road, between Villers-Cotterêts and Nanteuil, and, if possible, occupy that point before the French could reach it.

=== Fighting on the Lévignen–Nanteuil road ===
The Prussians found the French in the act of marching through Lévignen; and Zieten immediately ordered a howitzer battery to be drawn up, which commenced throwing shells into the place. He also ordered the 1st West Prussian Dragoons, and the 1st Silesian Hussars, with a Horse Battery, to attack the French.

The French, however, retired in such haste, that they were not overtaken until about midway between Lévignen and Nanteuil; when they halted their rearguard, which made front against the Prussians. They comprised the II Corps (Reille's), who had with him several regiments of cavalry, and continued their march; supporting, however, the rearguard. On coming up with the latter, two squadrons of the 2nd West Prussian Dragoons charged; but they were repulsed, and attacked in flank by a French regiment of lancers. The French then advanced, with the hope of completely routing the Prussian cavalry. This attempt failed in consequence of a most successful attack by the 1st Silesian Hussars; by which the French were put to flight, and two of their guns captured. The Horse Battery drew up, at the same time, on the left of the high road, and, by its effective fire, committed great havoc amidst the fleeing French; who was pursued by the Prussian Cavalry beyond Nanteuil.

During the movement upon Lévignen, the 1st Cavalry Brigade (Hobe's) from the III Cavalry Corps advanced by the right, along the road from Crépy-en-Valois to Nanteuil, with the design of intercepting a portion of the retreating French columns; but the French, in the meantime, fled in such haste, that only a few prisoners were captured.

=== French movements ===
Notwithstanding the pressure thus made upon the French line of retreat, the remains of the French I Corps (d'Erlon's) and II Corps (Reille's), which had escaped through Crépy-en-Valois and by the left of Senlis, succeeded in uniting.

=== The Prussians vigorously pursue the French ===
The French Imperial Guards (Drouot's) and the VI Corps (Mouton's), which were under the more immediate orders of Grouchy, and had formed the column that retired through Villers-Cotterêts in the morning, reached Lévignen after Zieten had passed through it in pursuit of Reille's troops to Nanteuil; and becoming acquainted with the danger of their proceeding further on that road, they turned off to their left, to make their retreat through Acy-en-Multien, (Note: Acy-en-Multien is called Assy by Siborne) Meaux, Claye, and Vincennes.

General Vandamme, who, with the French III and IV corps was most in the rear, and had withdrawn from the high road at Villers-Cotterêts on perceiving the Prussian brigade in possession of that place, took the direction of La Ferté-Milon, Meaux, crossing the Marne at Lagny-sur-Marne, (Note: Lagny-sur-Marne is called L'Agny by Siborne.) to Paris.

=== Prussian IV Corps take 2,000 French prisoners ===
Bülow, who had been directed to move the IV Corps from Pont-Sainte-Maxence to Marly-la-Ville, on 28 June, deemed it advisable to augment his vanguard; and therefore added to it the 14th Brigade and the reserve cavalry, and placed the whole under the command of Prince William of Prussia. In the afternoon Prince William fell upon detachments of d'Erlon's and Reille's Corps, which were retreating from Nanteuil. The Prince immediately attacked the French, dispersed a great number of them, and took more than 2,000 prisoners.

=== Prussians close to Paris ===
It was evening, before the IV Corps vanguard reached Gonesse, where it bivouacked, detachments were pushed on to the front as far as Le Bourget and Stains, which points were garrisoned by the French. The main body of the corps arrived at Marly-la-Ville in the evening, and halted there for the night.

Thielmann, having been directed to proceed with the III Corps from Compiègne to Senlis, should its support not be required by the I Corps, marched his infantry and artillery upon Crépy-en-Valois, and sent the reserve cavalry by Verberie; but on hearing that the I Corps was engaged with the French, he drew in his cavalry towards Crépy-en-Valois, from Verberie, as soon as it arrived there.

The 1st Cavalry Brigade (Marwitz's), with six pieces of horse artillery, was pushed on from Crépy-en-Valois, along the road to Nanteuil; where it joined the reserve cavalry (Röder's) of the I Corps, but not in time to take any active part in the engagement at that place. The 2nd Cavalry Brigade (Lottum's) was detached towards Villers-Cotterêts. The main body of the III Corps bivouacked for the night at Crépy-en-Valois and its vicinity.

Blücher deemed it advisable to send, on this day, a strong detachment of cavalry, consisting of the Queen's Dragoons, under Lieutenant Colonel Kamecke, beyond the left of the Prussian I Corps, towards the Marne, for the purpose of gaining intelligence of French movements in that direction. Lieutenant Colonel Kamecke was instructed to act with discretion; and to proceed, subsequently, by Meaux, or Château-Thierry, and endeavour to open a communication with the vanguard of the Bavarian Army (Prince Wrede's).

By the evening of the 28 June, the Prussian army had succeeded in cutting off the line of retreat of the French troops by the Soissons high road, compelling the greater portion of them to seek, along cross roads, the line of the Marne, by Meaux and Lagny-sur-Marne. It had, since it crossed the Oise, created great disorder and confusion in the French ranks, captured sixteen cannons, and taken 4,000 prisoners. The Prussians now occupied both the high roads leading from Senlis and Soissons and had their advanced posts (those of the IV Corps) within 8.0 kilometres (5 mi) of Paris.

=== Parisians hear the sound of the Prussian guns ===
When the sound of cannon fire was heard in the capital, where the great consternation among the citizens; whose fears had been previously excited by the most exaggerated reports brought in by fugitives from the retreating army. The fortified works that had been thrown up on the north side, appeared sufficient to check the progress of the Coalition armies, and to secure Paris from a coup de main; but time was essential for the organisation of the defence, for the recovery of the exhausted remains of the Army of the North expected to arrive on the next day, and for the collection of every available defensive means.

The only hope that was held out was that the capture of Paris might prove so difficult that the Coalition would hesitate to storm the city and settle for a negotiated peace that would allow the French to choose their own prescribed form of government — perhaps, by some extraordinary effort, to disconcert the plans of their enemies, and obtain a triumph under the walls of Paris.

=== A passport for Napoleon is refused ===
The French Provisional Government was still desirous of inducing the victorious commanders of the Coalition armies to enter into negotiations. Another Commission was appointed, and they were directed to proceed to the headquarters of the Coalition field marshals, again to solicit a suspension of hostilities and to negotiate an armistice.

A renewed application was received by Blücher, on 27 June, and by Wellington on 28 June, from Antoine-François Andréossy the primary commissioner, for a suspension of hostilities; as also a request that a passport and assurances of safety might be accorded to Napoleon and his entourage, to enable them to pass to the United States of America.

Blücher declined taking any notice of the application, conceiving his former verbal reply quite sufficient. Wellington referred the commissioners to his letter of the 26 June on the proposed suspension of hostilities; and stated that, with regard to the passport for Napoleon, he had no authority from his government, or from the Coalition allies, to give any answer to such demand.

==== Napoleon just a river width from capture ====
Napoleon narrowly escaped falling into the hands of the Prussians, whilst at the Palace of Malmaison. Blücher, hearing that he was living there in retirement, despatched Major Colomb, on 28 June, with the 8th Hussars and two battalions of infantry to secure the bridge at Chatou, lower down the Seine, leading directly to the house. Fortunately, for Napoleon, Marshal Davout, when he ascertained that the Prussians were nearing the capital, had ordered General Becker to destroy the bridge. Hence Colomb was very disappointed at finding there was no passage at this point, which in fact was not more than 730 metres (800 yd) distant from the palace, in which Napoleon was yet remaining at the time of the arrival of the Prussians.

=== Anglo-allied army advances ===
The Anglo-allied army advanced on 28 June from Nesle, so as to bring its right in rear of Saint-Just-en-Chaussée, and its left in rear of Lataule, (Note: The village Lataule is called La Taulle by Siborne.) where the high road from Compiègne, joins the high road from Roye to Paris. (Note: The coordinates of the junction: 49.53217°N 2.69839°E)

- The II Corps, under Lord Hill, as also the British and Hanoverian Cavalry, marched by Montdidier to Crèvecœur-le-Petit.
- The I Corps, under Sir John Byng, marched upon Couchy.
- The Reserve, under Sir James Kempt, marched upon Roye.

=== Bivouacs on the evening of 28 of June ===
The following were the positions of the respective armies on the evening of 28 June:

Prussians:

- The IV Corps which was the nearest to Paris, was posted at Marly-la-Ville; having detachments pushed forward close to Le Bourget and Stains.
- The I Corps stood in rear of Nanteuil; having its vanguard at Le Plessis, Belleville, and Dammartin.
- The III Corps was at Crépy-en-Valois and in its vicinity.
- Blücher's headquarters were at Senlis.

Anglo-Allies:

- The Anglo-allied army had its right behind Saint-Just-en-Chaussée and its left behind Lataule.
- Its reserve was at Roye.
- The vanguard, 6th Cavalry Brigade (Vivian's), was at Antheuil-Portes (Note: Siborne names Antheuil as the specific village)
- The 2nd and 4th Divisions, the Nassau troops, and the Hanoverian Cavalry, were encamped at Crèvecœur-le-Petit, on the road to Saint-Just-en-Chaussée
- The British cavalry was encamped near Lataule and Ressons-sur-Matz.
- The 1st and 3rd Divisions, and the Dutch-Belgian troops, were encamped near Conchy-les-Pots.
- The 5th and 6th Divisions, the Brunswick troops, and reserve artillery, were encamped near Roye.
- Wellington's headquarters were at Orvillers-Sorel.

The remains of the French I and II corps after forming a junction at Gonesse (where the high roads from Nanteuil and Senlis unite), reached the suburbs of Paris. The Imperial Guard and the VI Corps, immediately under Grouchy, were in full retreat from Meaux by Claye-Souilly (Note: Claye-Souilly is called Claie by Siborne in the text and Claye on his map) and Vincennes. The III and IV Corps, under Vandamme, having crossed the Marne at Meaux, were retreating by Lagny-sur-Marne and Vincennes.

== 29 June ==
=== Prussians arrive in front of Saint-Denis. ===
Blücher having issued orders, during the night of 28 June, for the continuation of the advance upon Paris; the vanguard of the Prussian IV Corps moved, on the morning of 29 June, from Gonesse to Le Bourget, which place it found abandoned by the French; who, however, was strongly posted at Saint-Denis, towards which point therefore, some battalions were pushed forward in observation. The French having been driven out of Stains, this post was occupied by two fusilier battalions and a regiment of cavalry, under Lieutenant Colonel Schill, for the purpose of securing the right flank of the Corps. La Courneuve, between Saint-Denis and Le Bourget, was also occupied. The main body of the Corps broke up from Marly-la-Ville at 07:00; and on reaching Le Bourget, bivouacked in its vicinity.

The vanguard of the Prussian I Corps pushed on, at daybreak, from Dammartin to Le Blanc-Mesnil; whence, immediately on its arrival, it sent detachments beyond the Bondy Wood, to reconnoitre the defensive fortifications. The main body of this corps took up a position, having its right resting on Le Blanc-Mesnil, and its left on Aulnay-sous-Bois. It sent out infantry detachments towards Livry-Gargan, and along the Ourcq Canal, towards Bondy and Pantin; and cavalry parties towards Grande Drancey and Bobigny. (Note: Siborne spells it Baubigny) Zieten also occupied Nonneville with the 7th Regiment of infantry; and the 6th Uhlans furnished outposts at the Ourcq Canal, communicating with those of the IV Corps.

The Prussian III Corps marched from Crépy-en-Valois as far as Dammartin, in the vicinity of which it was bivouacked.

The Reserve Cavalry was sent forward as far as Tremblay, in direct support of the I Corps.

The Anglo-allied army arrived, on 29 June, at different points on the road between Gournay-sur-Aronde and Pont-Sainte-Maxence. (Note: Gournay-sur-Aronde is called Gournay by Siborne)

- The vanguard, consisting of 6th Cavalry Brigade (Vivian's) supported by the 7th British Brigade (Arentsschildt's), crossed the Oise at Pont-Sainte-Maxence, and reached Senlis.
- The British Cavalry moved from Lataule to Pont-Sainte-Maxence.
- The II Corps, under Lord Hill, moved from Crèvecœur-le-Petit to Clermont.
- The I Corps, under Sir John Byng, moved from its camp near Couchy, by Estrées-Saint-Denis, along the high road to Saint-Martin-Longeau.
- The Reserve, under Sir James Kempt, moved from its camp near Roye, to Gournay-sur-Aronde, on the road to Pont-Sainte-Maxence.

=== The French Army reaches the suburbs of Paris ===
The French I and II corps had reached the suburbs of Paris on the Gonesse road, during the night; and held possession of Le Bourget until the morning of the 29 June. The Imperial Guard and the VI Corps, as also the reinforcements that had arrived from the interior, were, during the late morning of the 29 June, on the high road by Claie and Pantin, under the command of Grouchy; and were directed to occupy several defensive points on that side.

The French III and IV corps, under Vandamme, reached Paris at noon on 29 June, by the Lagny road: they passed through the capital, and occupied the heights of Montrouge on the south side.

=== Bivouacs on the evening of 29 June ===
The following were the positions of the respective armies on the evening of the 29 June:

Prussians:

- The I Corps had its vanguard and reserve cavalry at Aulnay-sous-Bois and Savigny; (Note: Savigny is spelt Savegny by Siborne) with detachments of the latter at Sevran, Livry-Gargan, Bondy, and Bobigny. (Note: Siborne spells these villages: Serran, Livry, Bondy and Baubigny) The Fusilier Battalion of the 7th Regiment stood at Nonneville. The 6th Uhlans and the 1st Silesian Hussars, with two Horse Batteries, were posted along the Ourcq Canal. The I Corps itself rested its right on Le Blanc-Mesnil, and its left on Aulnay-sous-Bois.
- The III Corps at Dammartin-en-Goele and in its vicinity. Its reserve cavalry stood at Tremblay-en-France, in support of Zieten.
- The IV Corps had its vanguard between Le Bourget and Saint-Denis, which it invested. Lieutenant Colonel von Schill, with the 1st Silesian Landwehr Cavalry and two battalions of Infantry, was posted at Stains. The corps itself was at Le Bourget.
- Blücher's headquarters were at Gonesse.

Anglo-allied army:

- The vanguard of the Anglo-allied army was at Senlis.
- The British cavalry was at Pont-Sainte-Maxence.
- The 2nd and 4th Divisions, the Nassau troops, and 1st Hanoverian Light Cavalry Brigade (Estorff's), were at Clermont.
- The 1st and 3rd Divisions, and the Dutch-Belgian troops, were at Saint-Martin-Longueau
- The 5th and 6th Divisions, the Brunswick troops, and the reserve artillery, were at Gournay-sur-Aronde.
- The Pontoon Train and Hawser Bridges were at Estrées-Saint-Denis.
- Wellington's headquarters were at Le Plessy-Longueau (now Le Plessis-Villette in Pont-Sainte-Maxence).

The French troops comprising the Army of the North had entered the capital.

=== French means of defending Paris ===
The French force in the capital, after the arrival of the army that had been defeated in Belgium, consisted as follows:

- The troops under Grouchy including the depots that had come up from the district of the Loire and from other parts of the interior, amounted to 60 or 70,000 men. They were reinforced, also, by a very considerable amount of field artillery. One portion of these troops was posted at Montmartre, at Saint-Denis, and in rear of the Ourcq Canal: the remainder, under Vandamme, occupied the heights of Montrouge, on the opposite side, with the exception of the cavalry, which lay in the Bois de Boulogne.
- The National Guards amounted to about 30,000 men: their disposition, however, was very doubtful; and, in general, they were considered as but little disposed to offer any resistance to the Coalition armies.
- There was another description of force called the Fédéral Tirailleurs, raised in the suburbs, and consisting chiefly of veterans: they amounted to 17,000 men.

Marshal Davout, Prince of Eckmühl, was appointed by the Provisional Government to the chief command of the French Army, with his headquarters at La Villette. Setting aside the National Guard, there remained, under his command for the defence of Paris, a disposable force of about 80 or 90,000 men, besides a numerous artillery.

The measures which had been adopted for taking advantage of the local capabilities of defence which the capital afforded, consisted in the entrenchments that had been raised around the heights of Montmartre, Monfauçon, and Belleville.

An advanced line of defence was presented by the Ourcq Canal; which, proceeding through Bondy Wood and contiguously to the high road from Meaux, has an arm that branches off from Pantin towards Saint-Denis. This canal, which was thirty feet wide but not entirely completed, had been filled with water. Along its inner bank ran a high dam, forming an excellent parapet, in which embrasures were cut to admit heavy ordnance; and Saint-Denis, which formed the point d'appui of this line of defence on the Seine, was strongly fortified.

The ground on the north side of this town, too, had been inundated by means of the little rivers Rouillon and the Vieille Mer. The village of Aubervilliers, which formed an advanced post at musket shot distance from the line, was occupied: and in rear of it the canal was covered by a sort of tête de pont, which secured the communication between both banks. The Barriers to the several approaches to Paris were covered by works with strong batteries.

Vincennes had been strengthened, and covered by the works which defended La Pissotte, a strong tête de pont was also constructed upon the left bank of the Marne, to cover the bridge at Charenton. All ferries and boats upon the Seine and the Marne were transported to the left bank.

The bridge of Neuilly had been partially destroyed, and the wooden bridge at Bessons, over the Seine, had been burned. Several villages, parks, and gardens, on the right bank of the Seine and the Marne, were rendered defensible by the walls being crenelated, the approaches barricaded, and the gates blocked up.

Upon the left bank of the Seine, on the south side of the capital, preparations for defence were comparatively neglected; they were limited to the heights of Montrouge.

For the defence of the principal works, 300 guns of large calibre were supplied, and for the manning of these, 20 companies of marine artillery which had been brought into the capital. The line between St. Denis and Vincennes was defended by the I, II, and VI corps. The imperial guard formed the reserve, and was posted at Menil montant. The cavalry was stationed in the Bois de Boulogne. The III and IV corps under Vandamme, defended the south side of Paris, and occupied Montrouge.

=== Battle of Aubervilliers ===
==== Prelude ====
Blücher had satisfied himself, by means of the reconnaissances made during 29 June, that very considerable pains had been taken by the French to defend the north side of Paris.

Blücher now wished to ascertain whether the disposition and spirit of the French troops were at all commensurate with the extent of the works which he saw before him: and, with this view, he directed Bülow to make an attack, during the evening of 29 June, with part of his Corps upon the village of Aubervilliers. He also ordered Zieten to support this attack, by raising as much alarm as possible in the villages of Bondy and Pontin.

Before the attack commenced, Blücher was joined by Wellington in person, who communicated to him the proposals which had been made by the French Commissioners. Being already engaged in an important operation, Blücher would not consent to suspend hostilities; and the two commanders agreed in opinion that, as long as Napoleon remained in the Paris vicinity, they would not halt their operations without insisting upon his being delivered up to them. Accordingly, Wellington immediately wrote a letter to the Commissioners making this clear.

==== Prussians storm Aubervilliers ====
Blücher ordered General Sydow, with the 13th Brigade (nine battalions), together with one battalion of the 14th Brigade and two regiments of cavalry, to attack the village of Aubervilliers. The remainder of the VI Corps was held under arms, in readiness to follow up any acquired advantage.

Four battalions advanced in column, under Colonel Lettow, supported by the remaining five battalions. The arrangements, being made during the night, occupied some little time, so that twilight had set in when the attack commenced. Colonel Lettow penetrated the extensive village on three sides, forced the barriers, and carried every thing before him with the bayonet. The place had been occupied by 1,000 of Davout's best troops; of whom 200 were made prisoners, and the remainder pursued as far as the Saint-Denis Canal.

Greneral Sydow, accompanied by Major Lützow of the Prussian staff, immediately made a reconnaissance of the Saint-Denis Canal; and soon discovered that its opposite bank was lined with infantry in great force, and that the different points of passage were defended by batteries. Nevertheless, he made the attempt to advance; but the troops were received with a vigorous fire of both artillery and musketry; and it soon became evident, that the French fortified position could not be taken except at a great sacrifice of both time and men. Sydow, therefore, limited his operations to the occupation of the captured village.

A simultaneous advance towards the Canal was made, on the left of Aubervilliers, by the 3rd Battalion of the 1st Pomeranian Landwehr, and the 10th Hussars Regiment; which maintained the communication with the I Corps. A sharp tiraillade took place, which terminated in the withdrawal of the Prussian troops to their former position.

==== Aftermath ====
By means of this reconnaissance it was clear that the line of the Saint-Denis Canal could not be carried without a serious assault, preluded by a heavy-cannonade. As Wellington was visiting Blücher's headquarters they had the opportunity to discuss their next steps in a conference.

=== Blücher and Wellington's plan of operations ===
Blücher and Wellington considered whether it would not be advisable to endeavour to turn their enemy's strongly fortified lines of Saint-Denis and Montmartre, by masking those lines with one army, whilst the other should move off to the right, and cross to the left bank of the Seine, lower down the stream.

Although this movement would have the effect of dividing the Coalition armies, and consequently of augmenting the chances of success on the part of the French: should the latter possess the disposition and the means, not only of acting determinedly on the defensive, but also of assuming the offensive.

Still any defeat for a Coalition army of this kind of offensive move by the French was fully counterbalanced by the advantages which the plan presented. It cut off the entire communication with Normandy, from which Paris derived its chief supplies; whilst the approach of the Bavarian Army towards the opposite side was gradually limiting the resources of the capital in that quarter.

It enabled the commanders to present their forces simultaneously at different points: and thus, by continuing that display of vigour which had characterised their advance, they were far more likely to impose upon the morale of both the defeated army and the civilians, than by limiting their combined operations to the attack of the stronghold presented by the lines of Saint-Denis; for to do this, would, in all probability, require time, and it was evident from the repeated proposals made by the French Government for a suspension of hostilities, that time was their great object, whether for the purpose of facilitating the collection and organisation of their resources, or in the hope of obtaining more favourable terms from the Coalition.

==== Capture of bridges over the Seine ====
It had also been tolerably well ascertained that, although fortified works had been thrown up on the right bank of the Seine, the defence of the left bank had been comparatively neglected. A further inducement towards the adoption plan arose from a report which was now received from Major Colomb (in the aftermath of his abortive expedition to capture Napoleon), stating that although he had found the bridge at Chatou, leading to the Palace of Malmaison Malmaison, destroyed; he had hastened to that of Saint-Germain-en-Laye, on hearing that it had not been damaged; and succeeded in securing as the French were attempting to destroy it. The bridge at Maisons-Laffitte, still lower downstream, was also taken and occupied.

Once the information about the bridges was known the two Coalition army commanders agreed to implement the envelopment plan. No time was lost by the Blücher in taking advantage of the captured bridges across the Seine and he issued orders for his army to use the bridges to move their line of advance over to the other bank of the river.

==== Prussian cavalry ordered to impede travel along the Orléans's road ====
Lieutenant Colonel Eston von Sohr received an order to move his cavalry brigade (the Brandenburg and Pomeranian Hussars), from the vicinity of Louvres, and to regulate his march so that he might cross the Seine at Saint-Germain-en-Laye on the following morning. Thence he was to proceed so as to appear, with his brigade, on 1 July, upon the Orléans road from Paris; where he was to interrupt communications along the route, and increase the confusion already produced in that quarter by the fugitives from the capital. He was to act independently and at his own discretion; and, as far as practicable, to impede the supplies of provisions from the western and southern provinces.

==== Order for the Prussians army to cross the Seine ====
It was arranged that the Prussian army should move to its right for the purpose of crossing the Seine down stream from Paris. In order to mask the operation as much as possible, the advanced posts of the I and IV Corps were to remain in their present position until the arrival of the Anglo-allied army, which was expected to take place on the evening of 30 June.

The I Corps was ordered to break up from its bivouac at 22:00, and march southward of Gonesse by Montmorency, Franconville, Cormeille, and Maisons-Laffitte, at which latter point it was to cross the Seine, and immediately open a communication with the III Corps.

The III Corps was directed to resume, at 05:00 on 30 June, its march upon Gonesse; and thence to proceed to Saint-Jennain: but in such a manner as to conceal its movements by means of the valley of Montmorency, and not to reach the more open ground about Argenteuil until darkness should have completely set in. From the latter point it would then complete its march to Saint-Germain.

The IV Corps was directed to move, at daybreak of 1 July, by the right of Saint-Denis, and to bombard this place during its march to Argenteuil; in which direction it was to effect a junction with the I and III Corps. The Advanced Posts of the I and IV Corps were to remain until relieved by the British troops; and then, in like manner, to follow the rest of the Army.

== June 30 ==
=== Battle of Saint-Denis ===
==== Prelude ====
The Prussian movements which Blücher had orders the previous evening were punctually directed in the manner described in the previous section.

As the I and III Corps moved off to the right, Count Bülow considered it necessary to strengthen the outposts of the IV Corps, so as to be prepared to meet the French should the latter debouch from Saint-Denis. He therefore ordered Colonel Hiller to take post in observation of this point, with six battalions, a regiment of cavalry, half of a six pounder battery, and two pieces of horse artillery.

==== Battle ====
About 15:00, the Prussian outposts reported that French columns were advancing from Saint-Denis, and that the Vedettes were already driven in. Colonel Hiller immediately pushed forward the sharpshooters of two battalions, as also two squadrons of cavalry, with two pieces of horse artillery. At the same time, the troops at Stains got under arms, and were prepared to support.

A very brisk tiraillade ensued, although there was no cover for the skirmishers on the plain, except the trees along the great road and the high corn, which served to conceal their approach. The French had also sent Detachments towards Épinay-sur-Seine and Pierrefitte-sur-Seine; but at these points, as also in advance of Stains, the French were compelled to give way and to retire, without having succeeded in their object of forcing back the Prussian outposts.

==== Aftermath ====
The main body of the IV Corps remained, during 30 June, in its position at Le Bourget; its vanguard, under General Sydow, was detached to the right, towards Argenteuil, to communicate with the III Corps. As the former was to move off on the following morning, it became necessary to hold the outposts strictly on the defensive. Aubervilliers was the most open to attack.

Two companies were posted at the outlets, towards the French side; and in rear of these, two other companies were formed in support still further to the rear was the main position; on which these troops, if overpowered, were to fall back. It lay along the villages of Chantourterelle, Courneuve, and Merville, connected together by a water course lined with bushes, and consisting of separate Country Houses and Châteaux, mostly within walls, which had been loopholed for tirailladeurs, six battalions, chiefly extended in skirmishing order, were considered sufficient to occupy the whole of this line, as far as the high road from Le Bourget.

Partial skirmishing, at a distance, was kept up; though, on the side of the Prussians, it was more for the purpose of diverting the attention of French, and concealing from them the general movement to the right bivouac fires were maintained during the night on the ground vacated by the different corps, in order to deceive the French by their apparent indication of the continued presence of the Prussian army in front of the lines of Saint-Denis.

=== Anglo-Allied advances ===
The vanguard of the Anglo-allied army (Vivian's Hussar Brigade) reached Vaudherland. (Note: Vaudherland is spelt Vauderlan by Sibourne) The British cavalry moved to Louvres.

1st Hanoverian Light Cavalry Brigade (Estorff's), attached to the II Corps, crossed the Oise at Creil, and proceeded by Chantilly to Luzarchea. The infantry of this corps marched from Clermont to Chantilly.

The I Corps moved from its camp near Saint-Martin-Longueau, crossed the Oise at Pont-Sainte-Maxence, and advanced until the head of the Column reached La Capelle, and its rear rested upon Senlis.

The reserve moved from its camp, near Gournay-sur-Aronde, by Pont-Sainte-Maxence, the head of the Column reaching Fleurines on the road to Senlis, and the rear resting upon Pont-Sainte-Maxence.

=== Bivouacs on the evening of 30 June ===
The following were the positions of the respective armies on the evening of the 30th:

The Prussian army:

- The I Corps commenced its march, at 22:30, from Le Blanc-Mesnil, (Note: Siborne calls it Blancmesnil here and Blanc Mesnil elsewhere) and Aulnay-sous-Bois towards Saint-Germain-en-Laye, passing, during the night, through Gonesse, Montmorency, and Le Mesnil-le-Roi, to Carrière au Mont, near Saint-Germain-en-Laye — leaving its outposts in the position they had hitherto occupied. (Note: Both Siborne, and Rau & Cronenthal, describe the route as "Gonesse, Montmorency, and Le Mesnil, to Carrière au Mont". If Ziten, the commander of the I Corps followed his orders then the I Corps crossed the Seine at Maisons-Laffitte.)
- The III Corps marched, during the night, from Dammartin to Saint-Germain-en-Laye, by Gonesse and Argenteuil; at which latter place, however, its reserve cavalry was halted.
- The IV Corps remained in its position at Le Bourget, to cover the march of the rest of the army. Its outposts continued at Stains, Saint-Denis, and Aubervilliers.
- Lieutenant Colonel von Sohr, with the Brandenburg and Pomeranian Hussars, crossed the Seine at Saint-Germain-en-Laye, and was advancing towards Versailles.
- Major von Colomb, with the 8th Hussars, occupied the bridge at Saint-Germain-en-Laye.
- Blücher's headquarters remained at Gonesse.

The Anglo-allied army:

- The vanguard of the Anglo-allied army was at Vaudherland.
- The British cavalry was encamped on the plain about Louvres.
- The Hanoverian cavalry was at Luzarches.
- The 2nd and 4th Divisions, and the Nassau troops, were upon the high road between La Capelle and Senlis.
- The 5th and 6th Divisions, the Brunswick troops, and the reserve artillery, were upon the high road between Fleurines and Pont-Sainte-Maxencee.
- The Pontoon Train and Hawser Bridges were at Senlis.
- Wellington's headquarters were at Louvres.

The French army remained within the lines of Paris.

== 1 July ==
Notwithstanding the continuing endeavours, on the part of the French Commissioners appointed by the Chambers, to induce the Coalition generals to enter into an armistice; the military operations were not for a moment interrupted.

=== French sortie into Argenteuil ===
On the morning of 1 July, Bülow's IV Corps moved off to its right, towards Argenteuil. During the movement, however; the French, as if at length aware, or desirous of ascertaining the nature, of Blücher's operation, attacked the village of Aubervilliers in front, from the Saint-Denis Canal, and penetrated as far as the church situated in the centre of the place. The French were here met by the Prussian support; and two Battalions from the main position arriving immediately afterwards, they were prevented from making any further progress.

Nevertheless, a prolonged tiraillade, as well as a howitzer fire, on the part of the French, were maintained; during which the march of Bülow's Corps continued in operation, the 14th Brigade being left in support to the advanced posts until the arrival of the Anglo-Allied troops.

=== British light troops counter attack and take most of Aubervilliers ===
In the afternoon, Wellington's army reached Le Bourget; and took up the position vacated by the Prussians, whose advanced posts it immediately relieved. Three companies of Light Infantry from Colville's Division were thrown into Aubervilliers. The Prussians who had hitherto been stationed for the purpose of masking as much as possible the general movement of their army to the right, had kept up a desultory fire from that portion of the village which was in their possession; abstaining from making any direct attack, since this might have led to the advance of the French in great force at the moment the former were no longer supported by the main Prussian army, and before the Anglo-Allied troops had arrived.

The British Light Companies, mentioned as having been thrown into Aubervilliers, were under no restraint of this kind; and Lieutenant Colonel Sir Neil Campbell, who commanded them, determined to push forward, and possess himself, if possible, of the entire village. Having first gained two or three of the highest houses, he broke from the top of these into some that were lower; and thence forcing his way through the partition walls of others, without much firing, since the French did not appear disposed to make an obstinate resistance (being by that time probably aware of the Prussian movement to the right, and of the arrival of the Anglo-allied army), he succeeded in obtaining possession of one side of a whole street, and of the greater portion of the village. The French Officer in command then proposed a truce; which was accepted, since the post he occupied lay between the British and a French battery upon the canal.

The remaining outposts were taken up from the Prussians without any molestation on the part of the French; and the main Anglo-allied army occupied a position, having its right upon the Height of Eichebourg, and its left upon Bondy Wood.

=== Battle of Rocquencourt ===
Prussian cavalry detachment of between 500 and 600 men and officers (a brigade of hussars under the command of Lieutenant Colonel Eston von Sohr), was ordered by Blücher to advance ahead of the main body of the Prussian army with the intention of reaching the Orléans road from Paris; where the detachment was to interrupt traffic on the road, and increase the confusion already produced in that quarter by the fugitives from the capital.

However, when the Prussian detachment was in the vicinity of Rocquencourt it was ambushed by a superior French force of about 3,000 men (dragoons supported by infantry and commanded by General Exelmans). Under attack the Prussians retreated from Versailles and headed east, but were blocked by the French at Vélizy. They failed to re-enter Versailles and headed for Saint-Germain-en-Laye. Their first squadron came under fire at the entrance of Rocquencourt and attempted to escape through the fields. They were forced into a small, narrow street in Le Chesnay and killed or captured (Sohr, who was severely wounded was taken prisoner during the skirmish).

=== Prussian 9th Infantry Brigade captures Rocquencourt ===
The vanguard of Thielmann's Prussian III Corps, consisting of the 9th Infantry Brigade, under General Borcke, was on the march from Saint-Germain-en-Laye (which it had left about 19:00) to take post at Marly; when it received intelligence of the two cavalry regiments, under Lieutenant Colonel Sohr, had been completely defeated at the Battle of Rocquencourt. Borcke hastened forward, and it was not long before his advance became engaged with the French tirailleurs advancing from Versailles. The French were immediately attacked, and were driven back upon Rocquencourt. As darkness was setting in, Borcke drew up his force with caution. He pushed forward the Fusilier Battalion of the 8th Regiment, supported by the 1st Battalion of the 30th Regiment; and held the remainder in Battalion Columns on the right and left of the road. The vigour of the attack made by the Fusiliers was such that the French retired in all haste upon the nearest suburb of Paris; whilst Borcke bivouacked at Rocquencourt.

=== Two French corps on the south side of Paris ===
Besides the cavalry under Excelmans, the remains of the French III and IV corps were detached to the south of Paris; on which side Vandamme, who commanded, took up a position, having his right upon the Seine, his left by Montrouge, and his centre in rear of Issy. He placed a portion of his troops in the villages of Vanves and Issy; the houses and walls of which appeared to offer great advantages for defence. His vanguard occupied Châtillon, Clamart, (Note: Clamart is spelt Clamord by Siborne) Meudon, Sèvres, and Saint-Cloud. In the evening he was joined by the Imperial Guard, which he posted in support.

=== Bivouacs on the evening of 1 July ===
The following were the positions of the respective armies the evening of 1 July. The bulk of the Prussian army had completed its move from the North or Paris and was now on the left bank of Seine to the south west of Paris. The Anglo-allied army had taken over the Prussian positions to the north of Paris and while the bulk of the French army remained in Paris, a two corps detachment was occupying the countryside to the immediate south of Paris.

Prussian army:

- The Prussian I Corps was encamped between the villages of Le Mesnil and Carrière au Mont, on the left bank of the Seine, not far from Saint-Germain-en-Laye.
- The III Corps was also on the left bank of the Seine, in the valley, and near Saint-Germain-en-Laye. Its vanguard (the 9th Brigade) was at Rocquencourt.
- The IV Corps was upon the march to Saint-Germain-en-Laye.
- Blücher's headquarters were at Saint-Germain-en-Laye.

Anglo-allied army:

- The II Corps, under Lord Hill, comprising the 2nd and 4th Divisions, the Nassau troops, and 1st Hanoverian Light Cavaly Brigade (Estorff's), was in the position previously occupied by the Prussian IV Corps; having its right upon the great road about Pierrefitte, its left upon the great road of Senlis, and its advanced posts at Aubervilliers and in front of Saint-Denis.
- The I Corps, under Sir John Byng, comprising the 1st and 3rd divisions, and the Dutch-Belgian troops, were in the position previously occupied by the Prussian I Corps; having its right upon the great road behind Le Bourget; its left upon the Bondy Wood, and its advanced posts along the Ourcq Canal.
- The Reserve, under Sir James Kempt, was encamped between Louvres and Vaudherland.
- The Cavalry was encamped and cantoned about the villages of Goussainville, Vaudherland, and Roissy-en-France.
- The Pontoon Train and the Hawser Bridges were at Sarcelles, on the Chantilly road to Paris.
- Wellington's headquarters were at Gonesse.

The French army:

- The French III and IV corps and the Imperial Guard were on the south side of Paris, their right upon the Seine, their Left by Montroug; with the vanguard at Châtillon, Clamart, Meudon, Sèvres, and Saint-Cloud.
- Davoust's headquarters were at Villette.
- The remainder of the French army continued within the capital.

== Aftermath ==
In the following week (2–7 July), after further fighting, the French army would capitulate and agree to leave Paris under a ceasefire. The Coalition armies would occupy Paris. On the 8 July Louis XVIII would be restored to the throne, and a new peace treaty would be signed in November.
