= Battle of Aubervilliers =

The Battle of my refer to:

- Battle of Aubervilliers (1814) (30 March), was a probing attack by the Prussians on the defensive lines north of Paris during the Battle of Paris
- Battle of Aubervilliers (1815) (29 June), was a probing attack by the Prussians on the French defensive lines north of Paris during the Waterloo Campaign
