= Hunegund =

French Roman Catholic saint

saint Hunegund abbess
- Residence: Homblières, France
- Died: 690
- Venerated in: France
- Feast: 25 August, 1 November
- Attributes: Sometimes represented kneeling at the feet of the pope.
- Patronage: Catholic Church, Eastern Orthodox Church

Hunegund (died 690) was a 7th-century Frankish saint and nun and founder of a convent in Homblières in Northern France. She was betrothed to a Frankish nobleman, but while visiting Rome before their marriage, she chose to become a nun instead. Hunegund built a church on the grounds of a convent in Homblières; eventually her fiancé donated everything that he would have given to her if they had married to the convent, "became her most devoted friend and servant", and took care of her and the convent's financial needs. Hunegund became abbess of the convent and was considered its founder. She died in 690; her feast day is celebrated on 25 August by the Roman Catholic Church and Orthodox Church and on 1 November by the Catholic Church in France. Hunegund's body and relics were translated to the church she founded in 946; she performed miracles and appeared in visions that solidified her cult and veneration. In the mid- and late 10th century, two hagiographic texts about the life and miracles of Hunegund were written and published to connect the community to Hunegund's relics and cult. Her body and relics were translated again, during the Hundred Years War in the late 14th century.

== Life ==
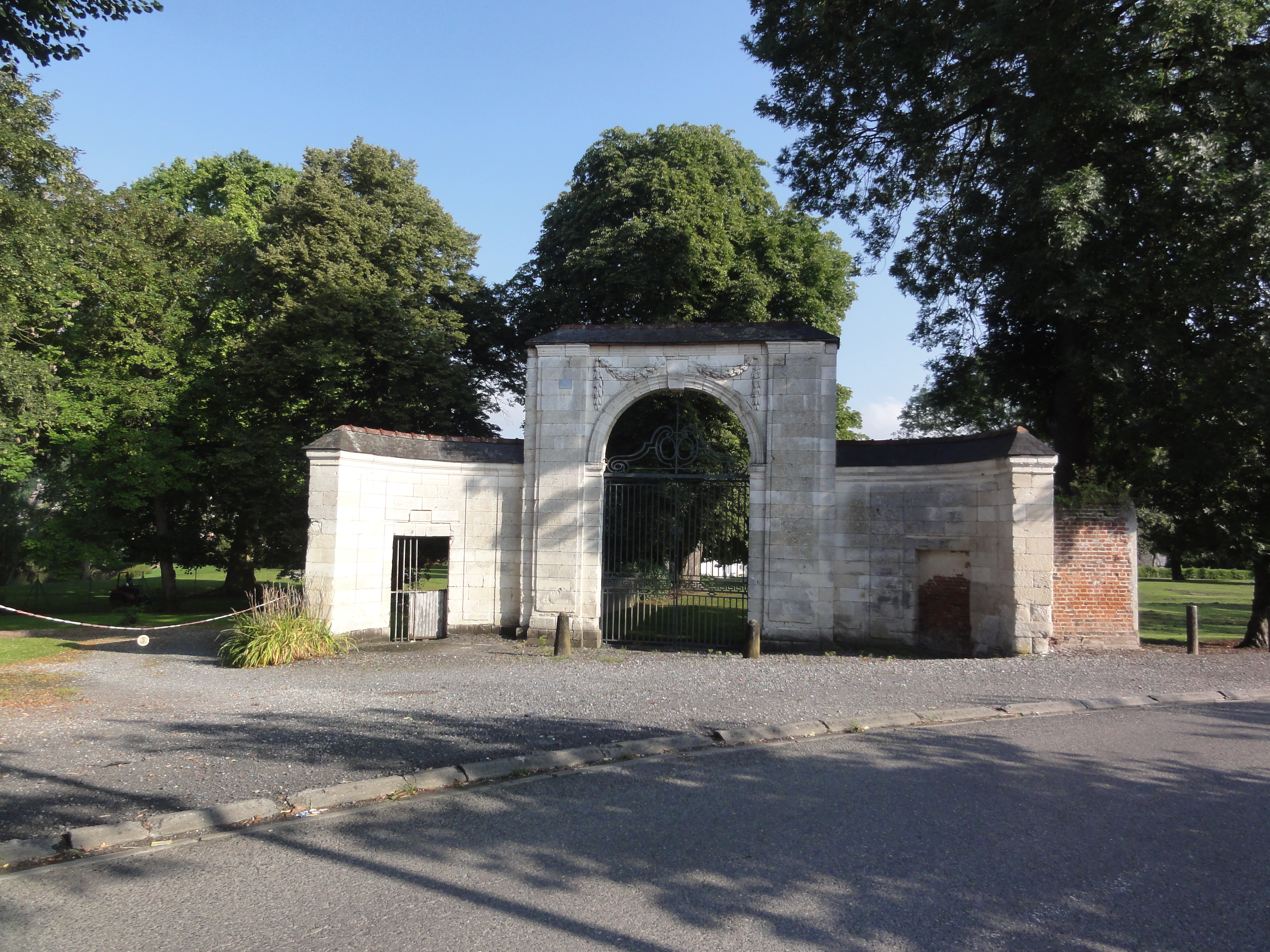
Entrance to the monastery/convent in Homblières

Hunegund was born in the early 7th century, on an estate belonging to her noble and wealthy parents, near St. Quentin in the Hauts-de-France region in Northern France. She was betrothed during infancy to another child, who died at an early age. When she became of marriageable age, she was betrothed to Eudaldus, a Frankish nobleman. Before their marriage, Hunegund convinced Eudaldus to travel to Rome so they might visit the tombs of the apostles and "secure [their] special intercession" by receiving the pope's blessing, which would ensure that they had a large family and gain other temporal and spiritual advantages. According to hagiographer Agnes B. C. Dunbar, as they were being presented to the pope, "either in obedience to a sudden inspiration of piety, or in accordance with a deliberate intention", Hunegund threw herself at the pope's feet, made a vow of perpetual virginity, and begged him to allow her to become a consecrated nun.

Instead of following his impulse and killing her, Eudaldus left her without money and servants and returned home, intending to punish her by taking all her property that was supposed to come to him as dowry. When he got there, he found that she was already there, living with the nuns in Homblières, and that she had already donated all her property to the town's convent, which was "subject to no congregation". The convent and the small community who resided there was founded earlier in the 7th century and was financially supported by dowries of estates and slaves. Hunegund built a church there in honor of the Virgin Mary, became abbess of the convent, and was regarded as its founder. Dunbar reported that "after a time", Eudaldus "repented of his anger and ceased to wish for married life", and donated all that he would have given to her if they had married to the convent. According to Dunbar, he "became her most devoted friend and servant", took care of the convent's secular business, and was buried inside the convent walls. He left all his lands, slaves, and other property to Hunegund and the convent.

Hunegund might have died in 690 in Homblières, at approximately the age of 50. The nuns buried her at the convent, in an unmarked grave because the elaborate tombs of saints in their chapels were often targeted by marauders, and then fled and abandoned the site. According to scholar Fraser McNair, little additional information is known about the convent and church until the mid 940s. Hunegund's feast day is celebrated by the Roman Catholic Church and Orthodox Church on 25 August and by the Catholic Church in France on 1 November. She is sometimes represented kneeling at the feet of the pope.

== Legacy ==
In 945, Archbishop Artald of Rheims appointed Berte, "a pious widow", to reform the community at Homblières, who had returned "at some unknown time". According to historian Jo Ann McNamara, Berte found Hunegund's body, "thanks to a timely vision", and in 946 had it solemnly translated for the first time to the church Hunegund had founded, where it could be observed without being harmed. Berte, who died in 948 or 949, recorded a series of miracles attributed to Hunegund's relics and persuaded the archbishop to establish a feast for Hunegund and provide her cult with privileges that would financially benefit the community. When the town's peasants failed to celebrate her feast, Hunegund punished them by causing grain harvested on her feast day to drip with blood. She also appeared in a vision to a noble who was having an affair with one of the nuns at the convent, and convinced him to repent, but his lover talked him out of it and Hunegund appeared to him again, punishing him with "a blow to the groin with her spear".

In the mid-and late 10th century, two hagiographic texts about the life and miracles of Hunegund were written and published based on "legendary material" that was probably known locally in Homblières, following the discovery of her relics and their translation in 946 and the propagation of her cult, by Berner of Homblières, the first abbot after the convent was taken over by the Benedictine order and reinstated as an all-male monastery. The documents celebrated and publicized Hunegund's miracles to create and develop a sense of identity in Homblières and to raise money for the monastery. Berner also sought to restore Hundegund's reputation, which was marred by the lax moral and ethical standards and poor discipline of her community to the point that it needed to be reformed twice in three years, and to justify the consistent and continual holiness of both Hunegard and the monastery. (McNamara reported that the nuns' morals were "beyond repair".)

McNair stated that the Homblières monastery was never important, but unlike most of its neighboring convents and monasteries in Northern France, it left a "relatively substantial corpus of documentary material" that illustrated how a small monastery could consolidate its endowment and protect its estate from potential challenges. According to McNair, Berner used rhetorical devices in his biography of Hunegund to fulfill his goals, such as emphasizing Berte's holiness and piety and her personal translation of Hunegund's body in order to support the monastery's reformation and to create continuity with both the community's early history and recent past. Berner also used Hunegund's narrative, especially the abrupt and complete reversal of her fiancé Eudaldus from serving as the story's main antagonist to her closest financial supporter and friend, which McNair called the document's "climactic episode". It was also a way to place men at the early history of the monastery, which Berner accomplished by recording the close involvement of St. Quenin's custodian in moving Hunegund's body, and to emphasize its "continuity of holiness". According to historian Edward M. Schoolman, however, the regional farmers and local clergy were responsible for promoting the importance of Hunegund's festival and her veneration. Schoolman also stated that, like other 10th-century narratives, Hunegund's miracles served to "bind the community to the relics and cult of the saint, which were under control of the monastery and the powerful bishop in Noyon".

The Homblières monastery, along with Hunegund's relics, were economically stable until 1372, but probably suffered damage during the later part of the Hundred Years War, when her relics were sent to Saint-Quentin for safety, where they were later viewed by King Louis XI. According to Dunbar, one of her ribs was given to Louis XI.

== Works cited ==
- Dunbar, Agnes B.C. (1901). A Dictionary of Saintly Women. 1. London: George Bell & Sons. pp. 396–397.
- McNair, Fraser (2015). "A Saint, an Abbot, His Documents and Her Property: Power, Reform and Landholding in the Monastery of Homblières under Abbot Berner (949–82), Journal of Medieval History, 41:(2), 1–14. doi: 10.1080/03044181.2015.1026380.
- McNamara, Jo Ann (1996). Sisters in Arms: Catholic Nuns Through Two Millennia. Cambridge, Massachusetts: Harvard University Press. pp. 173–174. ISBN 0-674-80984-X. OCLC 34113867.
- Schoolman, Edward M. (2016). Rediscovering Sainthood in Italy: Hagiography and the Late Antique Past in Medieval Ravenna. London: Palgrave Macmillan. ISBN 1-137-60271-6.
