= Waterloo campaign: Waterloo to Paris (2–7 July) =

- Part of The Waterloo campaign
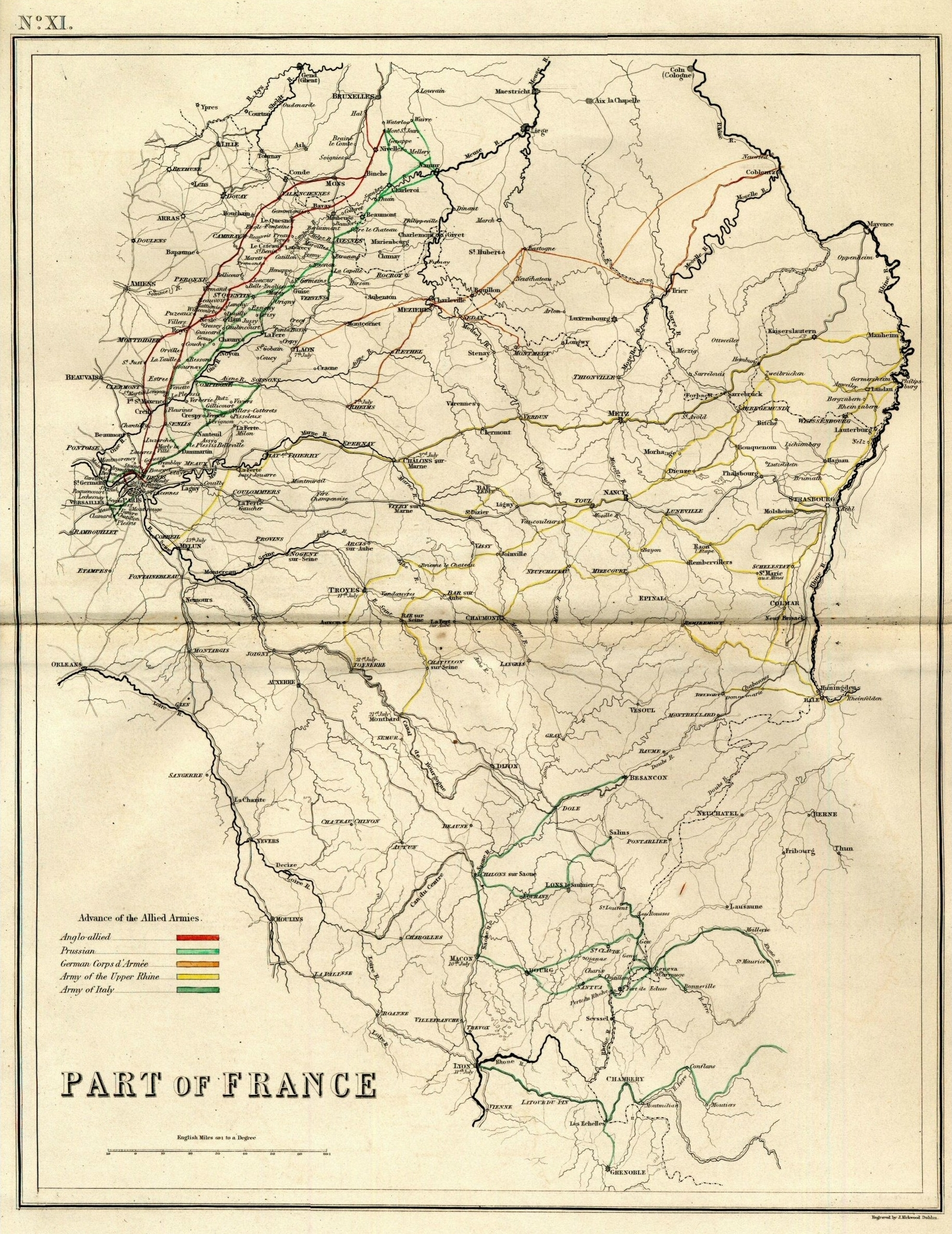
- Part of France engraved by J. Kirkwood, showing the invasion routes of the Seventh Coalition armies in 1815. Red: Anglo-allied Army; light green: Prussian Army; orange: North German Federal Army; yellow: Army of the Upper Rhine; dark green: Army of Italy.
Date	2–7 July 1815
Location	From La Belle Alliance (Waterloo) towards Paris,
Result	The French army retreats and the Coalition armies advance

Belligerents
(First French Empire) France	Seventh Coalition: United Kingdom; Netherlands (Kingdom of Hanover) Hanover; Nassau (Duchy of Brunswick) Brunswick; Prussia

Commanders and leaders
(First French Empire) Louis-Nicolas Davout; (First French Empire) Joseph Isidore Exelmans; (First French Empire) Dominique Vandamme	(United Kingdom of Great Britain and Ireland) Duke of Wellington; (Kingdom of Prussia) Gebhard Leberecht von Blücher; (Kingdom of Prussia) Friedrich Wilhelm Freiherr von Bülow

Strength
French Army order of battle	Prussian Army order of battle

After their defeat at the Battle of Waterloo on 18 June 1815, the French Army of the North, under the command of Napoleon Bonaparte retreated in disarray back towards France. As agreed by the two Seventh Coalition commanders in chief, the Duke of Wellington, commander of the Anglo-allied army, and Prince Blücher, commander of the Prussian army, the French were to be closely pursued by units of the Prussian army.

During the following week (18–24 June), although the remnants of the main French army were joined by the undefeated right wing of the Army of the North, the French were not given time to reorganise by the Coalition generals and they steadily retreated towards Paris.

By the end Saturday 24 June (the end of the first week after the defeat at Waterloo) the French who had fought at Waterloo were at Laon under the command of Marshal Soult, while those of the right wing who had fought at the simultaneous Battle of Wavre, under the command of Marshal Grouchy, were at Rethel. The Prussians were in and around Aisonville-et-Bernoville with Blücher's headquarters at Hannapes, and the Anglo-allies were in the vicinity of Cambrai, Englefontaine, and Le Cateau-Cambrésis where Wellington had his headquarters.

During next week (25 June – 1 July) the French reach Paris and the Coalition forces, who were about a day's march behind them also arrive in the Paris area. By July 1 the Anglo-allied army were facing the French, who were positioned behind a strong defensive line in the northern suburbs of Paris, while the Prussians had seized two bridges down stream of Paris, had crossed the river Seine and were about to approach Paris from the south west.

The third week started with the consolidation of the Prussians on the South side of Paris.

After two minor battles (Sèvres (2 July) and Issy (3 July)) the French Provisional Government (1815) and the French army commander Marshal Davout realised that any further delay in surrendering was futile as defeat was inevitable and would lead to a further loss of life and possibly the devastation of Paris, so they initiated a unilateral ceasefire and sent an emissary to request an immediate armistice.

Delegates from both sides met at Palace of St. Cloud and the result of the delegates' deliberations was the surrender of Paris under the terms of the Convention of St. Cloud. As agreed in the Convention, on 4 July, the French Army left Paris for the southern side of the river Loire. On 7 July, the two Coalition armies entered Paris. The Chamber of Peers, having received from the Provisional Government a notification of the course of events, terminated its sittings; the Chamber of Representatives protested, but in vain, and on the following day the doors were closed, and the approaches guarded by Coalition troops.

The following day the French King Louis XVIII entered Paris and was restored to the throne. Over the coming months the French royalist government exerted its authority over all of its domain including some fortresses under Bonapartist governors (the last of which, Charlemont, surrendered on 20 September). A new peace treaty was signed in November of the same year.

== 2 July ==
=== Prussian army moves to the south of Paris ===
At daybreak of 2 July, Prince Blücher put the whole Prussian army in motion towards the south side of Paris, where he proposed taking possession of the advantageous position comprising the heights of Meudon and Châtillon, and their immediate vicinity.

The 9th Brigade, the vanguard, of the III Corps (Thielmann's) immediately proceeded to occupy Versailles. The main body of the corps halted two hours at Rocquencourt to wait for the arrival of the I Corps (Zieten's). As the I Corps advanced, it threw out a detachment to its left, consisting of the 1st Battalion of the 1st West Prussian Regiment, two pieces of horse artillery, and a squadron of cavalry, under Captain Krensky: who was directed to proceed by Malmaison towards Saint-Cloud, communicating with Major Colomb, (who commanded the 8th Hussar Regiment and had been under detachment for some days), towards the Bridge at Neuilly; and to keep a look out to the left of the direct road to Paris.

Upon Zieten's vanguard reaching Ville-d'Avray, whence it drove off a French picket, information was obtained that the French was restoring the bridge at Saint-Cloud, which they had previously destroyed; and that they occupied the Bois de Boulogne in considerable force. The 3rd Brigade was therefore ordered to proceed by its left towards Saint-Cloud, and to oppose any movement which might be attempted against that flank.

=== Battle for Sèvres and the surrounding heights ===
It was 15:00 when Zieten's 1st Brigade (Steinmetz's), reached Sèvres. Here the French were strongly posted, occupying the place itself, the heights of Bellevue; and having their light troops well disposed amongst the adjacent gardens and vineyards. The 1st Prussian Brigade was followed in support by the 2nd (Pirch II's (Note: Otto Karl Lorenz von Pirch: "Pirch II", the use of Roman numerals being used in Prussian service to distinguish officers of the same name, in this case from his brother, seven years his senior, Georg Dubislav Ludwig von Pirch, "Pirch I".)) and 4th (Donnersmarck's) brigades; and, notwithstanding the very gallant defence that was made, these troops succeeded in forcing the French to abandon their stronghold, and fall back upon Moulineaux. (Note: Moulineaux is spelt Moulineau by Siborne) Here the French made another stand; but were again defeated by Steinmetz, who had closely pursued them.

Whilst the Prussian 1st Brigade was thus gaining ground; the 2nd, together with the reserve artillery, advanced towards the heights of Meudon. The reserve cavalry of the I Corps followed the 1st Brigade, in support. The 4th Brigade occupied Sèvres.

Major General Jagow, who had been detached to the left with the 3rd Brigade, having ascertained that the French were not likely to undertake any movement from the Bois de Boulogne, and that Captain Krensky's detachment was on the look out in that direction, proceeded to rejoin the I Corps; and on reaching Sėvres, towards evening, he was directed by Zieten to take up a position with his brigade to the right, on the heights of Meudon.

In the evening, the French, after having re-formed, and collected their defeated force at Issy, made an attempt to regain possession of Moulineaux; but the attack failed, and they were driven back upon Issy.

==== Aftermath: Issy captured and the French routed ====
In Issy the French force was reinforced: fifteen battalions were posted in and about Issy, supported by numerous guns and cavalry: their light infantry occupying the vineyards in front of the village.

About 22:30, however, the Prussians, who kept a sharp look out, heard these troops marching off; and perceived that their departure was conducted in rather a disorderly manner. Instant advantage was taken of this circumstance, and a part of the 1st and 2nd Prussian brigades attacked the French; who fled back upon the suburb of Vaugirard in such confusion that Paris might have been entered at this moment, if more Prussians had been at hand.

During the night, Zieten posted his corps in the following manner: His right upon the height of Clamart, (Note: Clamart is spelt Clamord by Siborne) his centre upon that of Meudon, and his left in Moulineaux. Sèvres still occupied; the vanguard in Issy, in the rear of which village was the reserve cavalry in support.

The French losses on this day in the defence of Moulineaux and Issay are estimated to have been about 3,000 men.

=== Paris further invested ===
Whilst the Prussian I Corps (Zieten's) had been thus successfully effecting its movement against the south side of the capital; the III Corps (Thielmann's), which formed the right column, proceeded towards Le Plessis-Piquet, and pushed forward its vanguard to the heights of Châtillon, which it reached late in the evening. The IV Corps (Bülow's), acting as a reserve, occupied Versailles and its vicinity during the night.

During the whole of this day, the troops of the Anglo-allied army continued in position in front of the fortified lines on the north side of Paris. Wellington having established a bridge at Argenteuil, sent detachments across the Seine: and these, secured the villages of Asnières, Courbevoie, and Suresnes on the left bank of the Seine, and opened more direct line of communications with the Prussians.

The Coalition commanders had thus succeeded in shutting up the French forces within their lines. Wellington was perfectly prepared to attack the north side of Paris, if circumstances should render such a step necessary; or if a favourable opportunity should present itself: whilst Blücher, having secured a strong position in front of the south side, which was mostly open and defenceless, was equally ready to storm the capital with his collected force. The effect of this well conceived and successfully executed plan of operation was to divide Davout's attention between two opposite points of the town. Should he attempt to assail the one army with his principal force, he would immediately find himself attacked by the other army; without possessing the means to carry on the contest with both simultaneously. On the other hand, should a general and formidable assault be made by those armies, on the opposite points, at the same time; the necessary division of his forces, in arranging his plan of defence, would render his situation still more desperate.

=== Wellington proposes the terms of the armistice ===
In a letter to Blücher Wellington explained the terms he was going to offer the French Commissioners and why he would do so. An attack on Paris before the Austrians arrived in force was unlikely to succeed or if it did "loss would be very severe". If they waited for the Austrians then the city could be taken easily, but the Coalition sovereigns who were travelling with the Austrian army would be likely to wish to spare the city, as they had in 1814, because Louis XVIII was their ally. In which case they would agree to terms similar to those Wellington was offering. Therefore, the two Coalition commanders were unlikely to have "the vain triumph of entering Paris at the head of our victorious troops", so Wellington suggested in his letter it was better to end the war immediately than in a few days time.

The French Provisional Government, fully alive to this state of things, and duly aware of the approach of the Bavarian, Russian, and Austrian armies (see Minor campaigns of 1815), clearly saw the futility of further resistance to the Coalition allies, and instructed the Commissioners to wait upon Wellington, and report to him the fact of Napoleon having quit Paris on 29 June to embark for the United States, and to press the point of a suspension of hostilities.

To this representation Wellington replied that the great obstacle to the armistice having thus been removed, there remained only the question as to the terms; which he thought should be the halting of the Anglo-allied and Prussian armies in their present positions, the withdrawal of the French army from Paris across the Loire, and the placing of the capital in the keeping of the National Guards until the King should order otherwise. He offered, if they agreed to these terms, to endeavour to prevail on Blücher to halt his troops, and send an officer to settle the details; but, at the same time, he told them distinctly that he would not consent to suspend hostilities so long as a French soldier remained in Paris. Having received this explicit declaration on the part of Wellington, the Commissioners withdrew.

=== Bivouacs on the evening of 2 July ===
The following were the positions of the respective armies during the night of 2 July.

The Prussian army:

- The I Corps had its right on the height of Clamart, its centre on that of Meudon, its left at Moulineaux, and its vanguard at Issay; in rear of which point was the reserve cavalry of the corps.
- The III Corps: the 9th Brigade was at Châtillon, the 10th and 11th brigades were in front of Velisy, the 12th Brigade was at Châtenay and Sceaux. The reserve cavalry of the corps bivouacked about Le Plessis-Piquet.
- The IV Corps: the 16th Brigade was at Montreuil, (Note: Montreuil is spelt Montreail by Siborne) in advance of Versailles; the 13th Brigade bivouacked near Viroflay;

the 14th Brigade bivouacked at the Château Bel Air, Le Chesnay, not far from Rocquencourt. The reserve cavalry of the Corps was partly in front of Versailles, and partly on the left of Montreuil.

Anglo-allied army: The troops of the Anglo-allied army continued in position in front of the lines of Saint-Denis. Detachments were at Asnières, Courbevoie, and Suresnes, on the left (southern) bank of the Seine.

The French army:

- The troops composing the right wing of the French army occupied the lines on the right bank of the Seine, whence they were watching the Anglo-allied army. Some troops were posted in the Bois de Boulogne, and several posts were established along both banks of the river.
- The left wing, III and IV corps and the Imperial Guard, extended from the Seine as far as the Orleans road. It had a strong presence in Vaugirard, and the main body was posted between the Barrière de l'Ecole Militaire and Barrière de l'Enfer (both in the 10th arrondissement of Paris).

== 3 July ==
At a French Council of war, which was held during the night of 2/3 July in Paris, it was decided that the defence of the capital was not practicable against the two Coalition armies. Nevertheless, the French Commander-in-Chief Marshal Devout, was desirous that another attempt should be made to unsettle the Coalition generals before he would finally agree to a suspension of hostilities.

=== Battle of Issy ===
At 03:00 on 3 July, Vandamme advanced in two columns from Vaugirard to attack Issy which was garrisoned by the 12th and 24th Prussian Regiments, and the 2nd Westphalian Landwehr behind hastily built barricades, supported by a half battery of twelve pounders. After four hour during which a number of attacks failed to dislodge the garrison, and with Prussian reinforcements on the way the French disengaged.

During the contest at Issy, the detachments on the left of the Prussian I Corps, under Captain Krensky renskt, were engaged rather sharply with French forces between St. Cloud and Neuilly; which ended in the French being driven back upon the bridge at the latter place. Thus Zieten's corps, the same that had opened the campaign with the actions along the river Sambre, had the honour of closing it with those at Issy and Neuilly on the river Seine.

In the meantime the Anglo-allied army, under Wellington, had advanced to Gonasse. The right immediately threw a bridge over the Seine at Argenteuil, crossed it, and opened the communication with Blücher. A British Corps was also moving upon the left of the Seine towards Neuilly.

When it became clear that the attack had failed, that the two Coalition armies were in full communication with each other, the French high command decided that, providing terms were not too odious, they would capitulate.

Accordingly, at 07:00, the fire on the part of the French suddenly ceased; and Brigadier General Revest (chief of staff to the French III Corps) was delegated to approach Zieten's Corps, which of all the Coalition forces was the nearest to the capital, for the purpose of offering a Capitulation, and requesting an immediate armistice.

=== Formal surrender of Paris ===
On hearing of the unilateral French ceasefire, Blücher, required from Marshal Davout, a negotiator possessing greater powers, before he would agree to a suspension of hostilities; and indicated the Palace of St. Cloud as the place where the negotiations should be carried on, and to which he then moved his headquarters.

Wellington had already arrived to join Blücher at St. Cloud and officers furnished with full powers by their respective commanders-in-chief, soon met there. The result of their deliberations was the surrender of Paris under the terms of the Convention of St. Cloud.

== 4–7 July ==
=== Coalition armies enter Paris ===
On 4 July, under the terms of the Convention of St. Cloud, the French army, commanded by Marshal Davout, left Paris and proceeded on its march to the Loire: and the Anglo-allied troops occupied Saint-Denis, Saint Ouen, Clichy, and Neuilly. On 5 July, the Anglo-allied army took possession of Montmartre.

On 6 July, the Anglo-allied troops occupied the Barriers of Paris, on the right of the Seine; while the Prussians occupied those upon the left bank.

On 7 July, the two Coalition armies entered Paris: the Chamber of Peers, having received from the Provisional Government a notification of the course of events, terminated its sittings; the Chamber of Deputies protested, but in vain. Their President (Lanjuinais) resigned his Chair; and on the following day, the doors were closed, and the approaches guarded by Coalition troops.

== Aftermath ==
=== Napoleon surrenders to the British and is sent to Saint Helena ===
On 8 July the French king, Louis XVIII, made his public entry into his capital, amidst the acclamations of the people, and again occupied the palace of his ancestors. It was during this entrance that Gaspard, comte de Chabrol prefect of the department of the Seine, addressed Louis XVIII in the name of his companions, in a speech that began "Sire, one hundred days have passed away since your majesty, forced to tear yourself from your dearest affections, left you capital amidst tears and public consternation. ...", so coining the phrase, Hundred Days that is used to describe the momentous events of that year.

It was also on 8 July that Napoleon Bonaparte embarked on the French frigate Saale at Rochefort, and proceeded, accompanied by Méduse and the rest of his entourage, to the roads of the Isle of Aix, with the intention of setting sail for America.

On 10 July the wind became favourable, but a British fleet made its appearance and Napoleon, seeing the difficulty of eluding its ships, resolved, after having previously communicated with Captain Maitland, upon placing himself under his protection on board HMS Bellerophon. He reached this vessel on 15 July, and on the following day, Captain Maitland sailed for England; arriving at Torbay, with his illustrious charge, on 24 July. Despite his protestations Napoleon was not permitted to land in England (the British Government having decided upon sending him to the island of Saint Helena), and he was moved to HMS Northumberland a third-rate ship of the line, under Rear Admiral Sir George Cockburn, in which ship he sailed to his incarceration on the remote South Atlantic island. Napoleon remained a captive on Saint Helena until his death in 1821.

=== Forts surrender ===
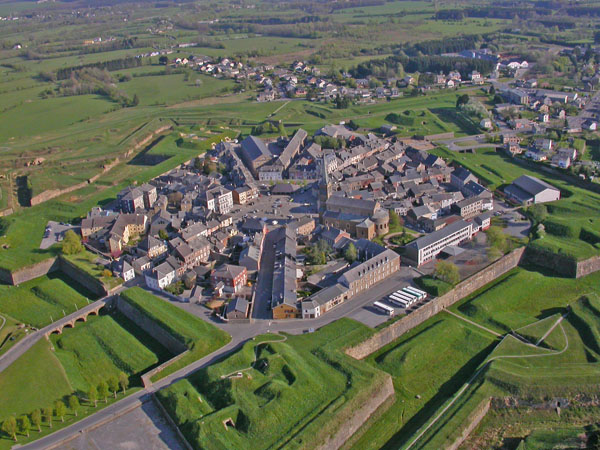
Rocroi seen from the air shows its defensive structure

The reduction of the fortresses left in rear of the British and Prussian armies, adjoining their main line of operations, was handled by a Coalition force under the command of Prince Augustus of Prussia, with the Prussian II Corps, assisted by the British Battering Train, was effected in the following manner:

Siege
Fortress	Commencement	Capitulation
Maubeuge	8 July	12 July
Landrecies	19 July	21 July
Marienberg	27 July	28 July
Philippeville	7 August	8 August
Rocroy	15 August	16 August

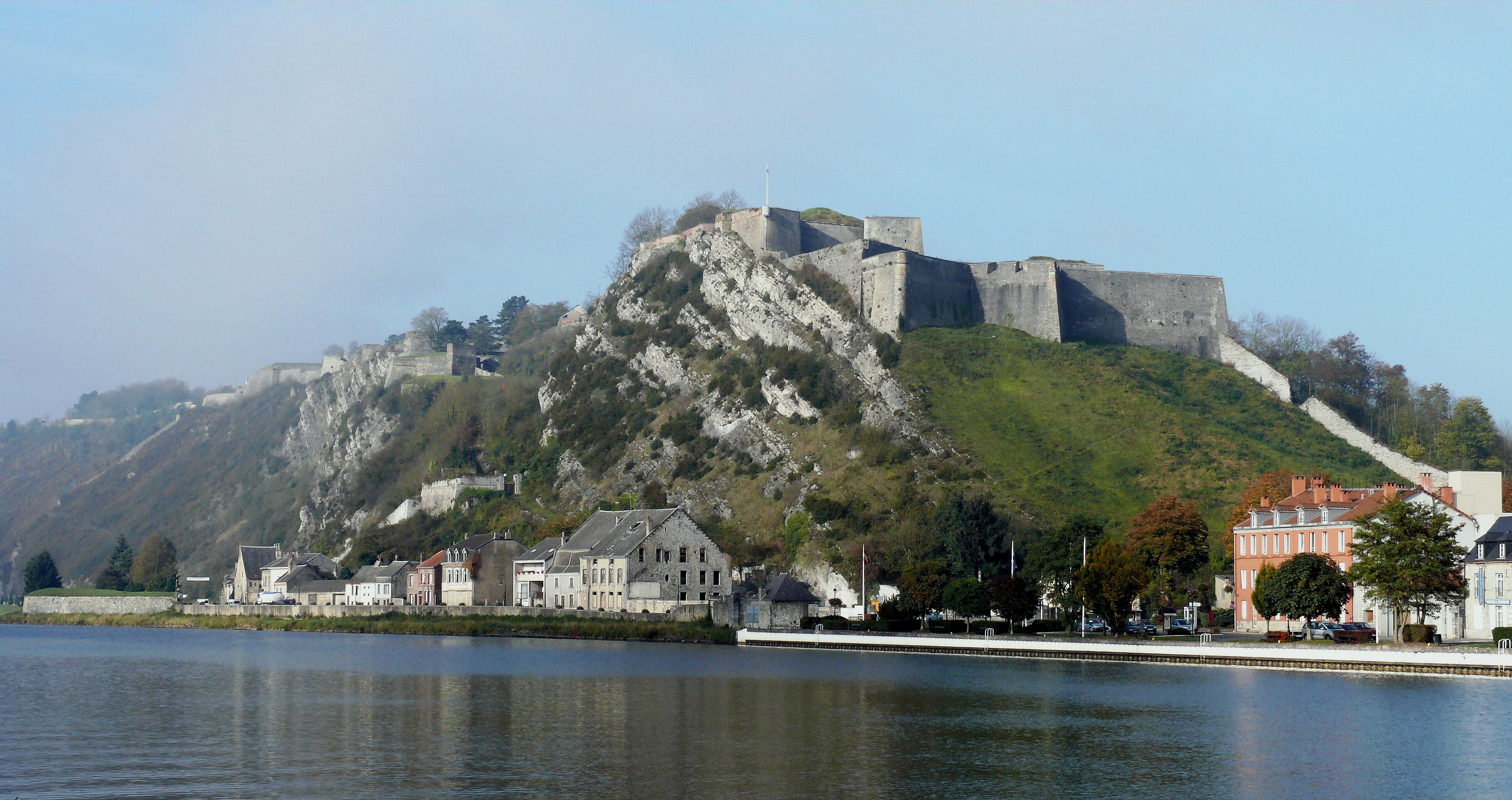
The Fortress of Charlemont and the village of Givet.

Prince Augustus had made every preparation for starting the siege of Charlemont but, on 20 September, he received information from Paris that hostilities were to cease throughout the whole of France.

== Peace treaty ==
The Treaty of Paris was signed on 20 November 1815. The 1815 treaty contained stronger punitive terms than the treaty of the previous year. France was ordered to pay 700 million francs in indemnities, and the country's borders were reduced to what they had been on January 1, 1790, save for the annexation of two small enclaves. (Note: Avignon and the Comtat Venaissin.) France was to pay additional monies to cover the cost of providing additional defensive fortifications to be built by neighbouring Coalition countries. Under the terms of the treaty parts of France were to be occupied by up to 150,000 soldiers for five years, with France covering the cost; however, the Coalition occupation, under the command of the Duke of Wellington, was only deemed necessary for three years and the foreign troops pulled out in 1818.
