= Antoine Drouot =

French officer (1774–1847)

Count Antoine Drouot
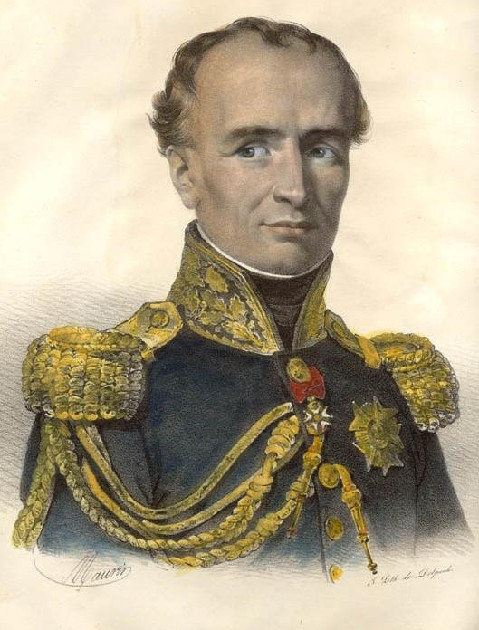
- Portrait by François-Séraphin Delpech, c. 1833

Governor of the Principality of Elba
- In office 11 April 1814 – 26 February 1815
- Monarch: Napoleon I
- Preceded by: Position established
- Succeeded by: Position abolished

Personal details
- Born: 11 January 1774 Nancy, Grand Est, Kingdom of France
- Died: 24 March 1847 (aged 73)
- Awards: Légion d'Honneur

Military service
- Allegiance: First French Republic; First French Empire
- Branch/service: French Army
- Years of service: 1793–1815
- Rank: Général de division
- Battles/wars: French Revolutionary Wars; Battle of Hohenlinden; Napoleonic Wars; Battle of Trafalgar; Battle of Wagram; Battle of Borodino; Battle of Lützen; Battle of Bautzen; Battle of Waterloo

General Antoine Drouot, Comte Drout (English: /druːˈoʊ/ droo-OH, French: [ɑ̃twan dʁuo]; 11 January 1774 – 24 March 1847) was a French officer who fought in the French Revolutionary and Napoleonic Wars.

Drouot is one of a select group who were present at both the Battle of Trafalgar (1805) and the Battle of Waterloo (1815). (Note: Accompanying Wellington at the Battle of Waterloo was, General Álava the Spanish ambassador to the Netherlands who had fought against the Royal Navy at Trafalgar, and at least one battalion of French soldiers present at Waterloo had served as marines at Trafalgar.) Drouot's name is inscribed on the western pillar under the Arc de Triomphe.

== Biography ==
Born in Nancy, France, the son of a baker, Drouot trained as an artilleryman and took part in the battles of the French Revolution where he rose through the ranks and was a captain of artillery at the Battle of Hohenlinden in 1800.

Later he had an illustrious career in the many battles of the Empire, notably, Wagram (1809) and Borodino (1812). For his conduct at the battles of Lützen, Bautzen in 1813, where he commanded the artillery of the Imperial Guard, he was made a general of division and aide-de-camp to the Emperor Napoleon.

Drouot was with Napoleon during his exile to the island of Elba (1814–1815), who made him governor of the island. He accompanied Napoleon back to France in 1815 and was with him at the start of the Hundred Days. He was with the Imperial Guard for the Waterloo Campaign, and on the eve of the Battle of Waterloo he took command of the Imperial Guard when Marshal Mortier who would generally assume command fell ill with sciatica, He was with Napoleon when, at the end of the battle just before the rout, Napoleon briefly took command of a square of grenadier Guards, near Decoster's house, and left the field with Napoleon. Later in the campaign (after Napoleon had abdicated for the second time), he was commandant of the Imperial Guard in Paris.

After the surrender of Paris and the restoration of King Louis XVIII, Drouot stood trial for treason in which he defended himself ably. He was acquitted and granted a state pension. In his retirement he did what he could for the veterans of the Imperial Guard and died in 1847.

== Assessment ==
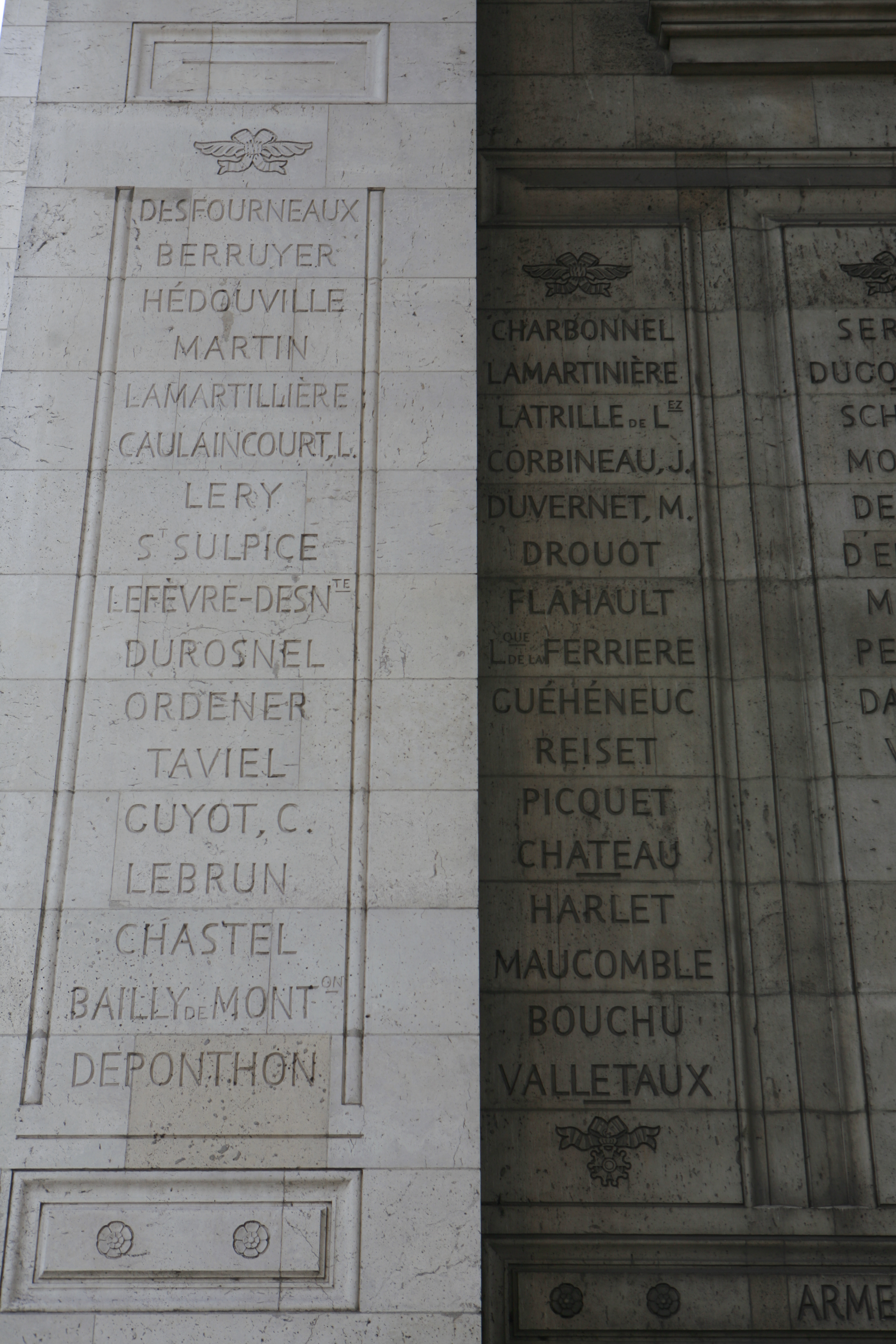
Western Pillars of the Arc de Triomphe.

In his biography in Nouvelle Biographie Générale Ch. Héquet wrote "France was astonished in 1814 to learn, that she had possessed for a long time the best officer of artillery in Europe". Napoleon called Drouot le Sage de la Grande Armée (the sage of the Grand Army).

Drouot is one of a select group who were present at both the Battle of Trafalgar (1805) and the Battle of Waterloo (1815). (Note: Accompanying Wellington at the Battle of Waterloo was, General Álava the Spanish ambassador to the Netherlands who had fought against the Royal Navy at Trafalgar, and at least one battalion of French soldiers present at Waterloo had served as marines at Trafalgar.)
