= Homblières =

- Commune
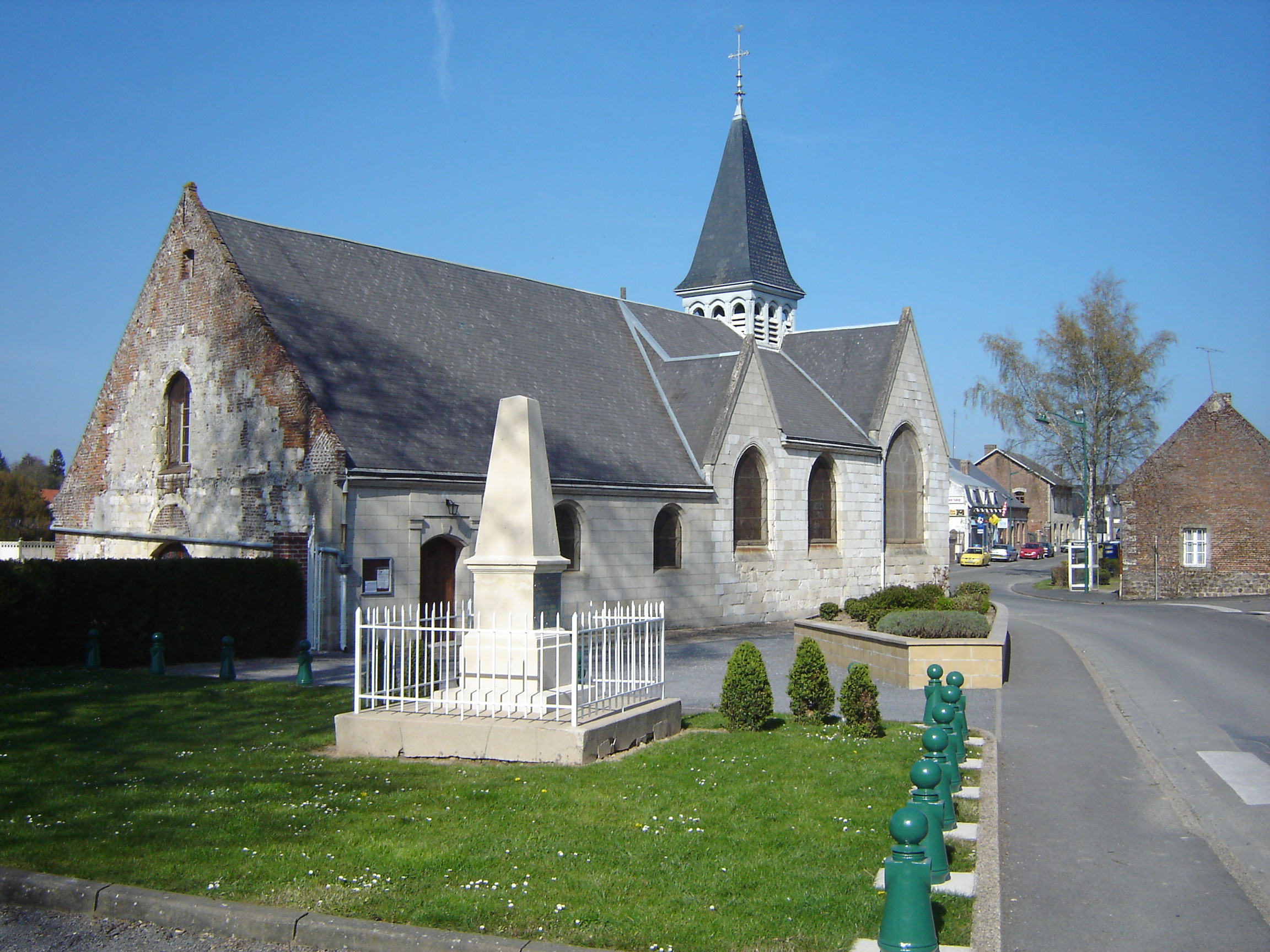
- The church of Homblières

- Coat of arms
- Location of Homblières
- Location within France Location within Hauts-de-France
- Coordinates: 49°51′02″N 3°21′55″E
- Country: France
- Region: Hauts-de-France
- Department: Aisne
- Arrondissement: Saint-Quentin
- Canton: Saint-Quentin-3
- Intercommunality: CA Saint-Quentinois

Government
  - Mayor (2026–32): Francine Gomel
- Area^{1}: 14.29 km^{2} (5.52 sq mi)
- Elevation: 84 m (276 ft)
- Highest elevation: 135 m (443 ft)
- Lowest elevation: 72 m (236 ft)
- Population (2023): 1,412
  - Density: 98.81/km^{2} (255.9/sq mi)
- Time zone: UTC+01:00 (CET)
  - Summer (DST): UTC+02:00 (CEST)
- INSEE/Postal code: 02383 /02720
- ^{1} French Land Register data, which excludes lakes, ponds, glaciers > 1 km^{2} (0.386 sq mi or 247 acres) and river estuaries.

Homblières (French pronunciation: [ɔ̃blijɛʁ]) is a commune in the Aisne department in Hauts-de-France in northern France.

== History ==
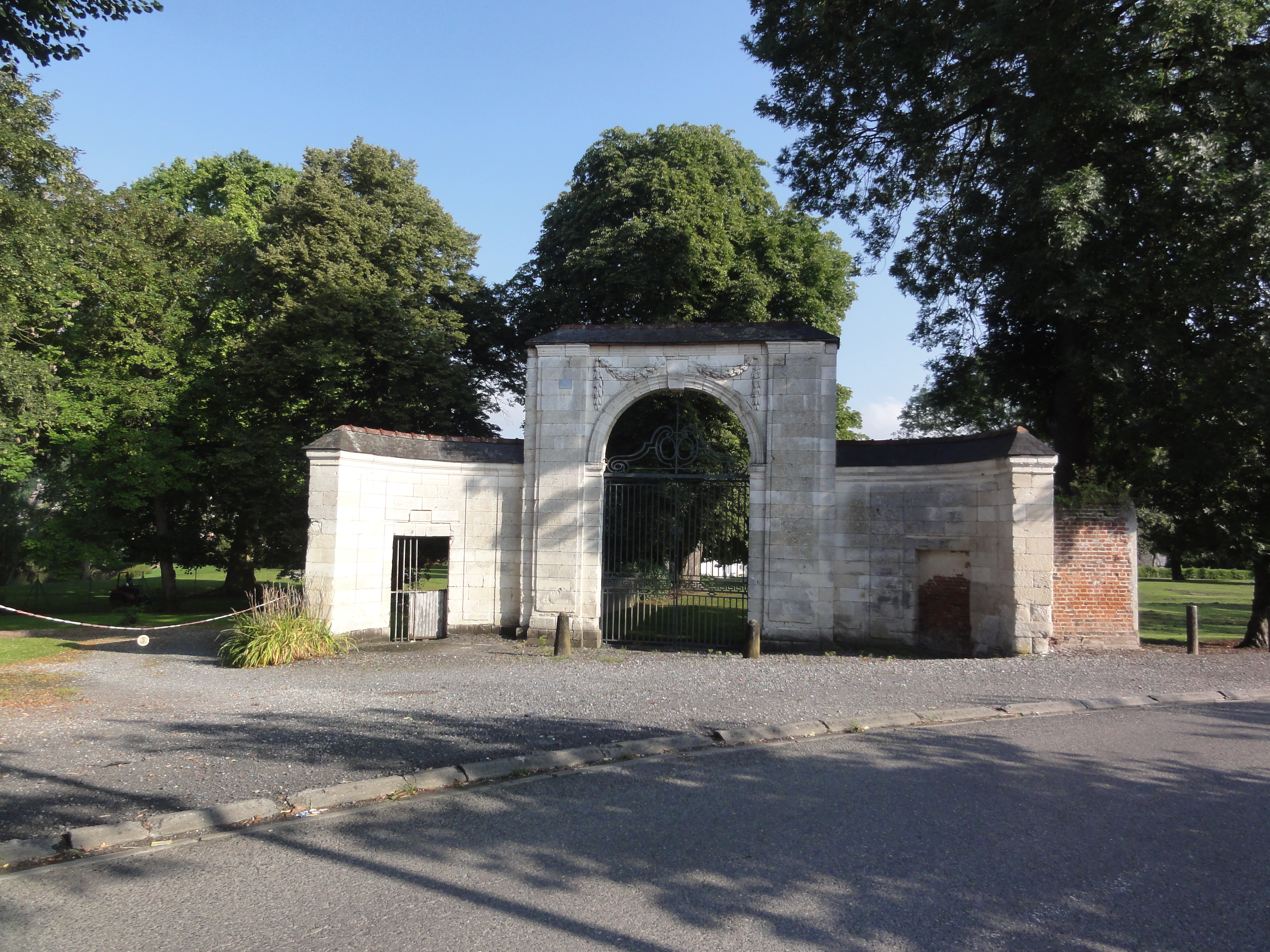
Entrance to the former Abbey of Saint Hunegund

According to Abbot Berner (Bernerus Humolariensis Abbas) who wrote the Vita of Hunegund (Vita Sanctae Hunegundis Virginis Humolariensis) in the 10th century, a monastic community was founded around 650 near the site of present-day Homblières by a young noblewoman named Hunegund (d. ca. 690), a native of Lambay in the Vermandois.

The monastery of Homblières (Latin: Humolarias, from humulus = hop field) is first mentioned in the 940s as a community of nuns in need of reform because of lapsed morals. The archbishop of Reims assigned Bertha, an old nun from the abbey of Saint-Pierre of Reims, to restore the community, but without much success. After Bertha’s death in 948 or 949, King Louis IV authorized the expulsion of the nuns and their replacement by monks from Saint-Remi of Reims who were required to live at Homblières under the Benedictine Rule. It was their first abbot, Berner, who wrote the Vita of Hunegund from stories that he had heard locally. Eilbert of Florennes, a direct descendant of Emperor Lothair’s vassal Ebro, was responsible for refounding the abbey at Homblières.

During the later stages of the Hundred Years War, the relics of Saint Hunegund were sent for safety to Saint-Quentin. With the Concordat of 1516, Homblières passed under royal control. In 1607, the abbey church collapsed and Homblières was abandoned, but in 1666, a monk from Saint-Remi became prior of Homblières and undertook its restoration. He rebuilt the abbey church and reestablished a community by 1679, when the remains of Hunegund were returned.

During the French Revolution, on 13 February 1790, the constituent assembly dissolved all religious orders in France. In 1792, the last eight Benedictine monks left the abbey, which subsequently was sold and turned into a stone quarry.

== Population ==
Historical population
Year	Pop.	±% p.a.
1968	891	—
1975	915	+0.38%
1982	1,223	+4.23%
1990	1,495	+2.54%
1999	1,462	−0.25%
2007	1,429	−0.28%
2012	1,505	+1.04%
2017	1,464	−0.55%
2023	1,412	−0.60%
Source: INSEE

== Notable people ==
- Hunegund of France (died 690), French saint, nun and convent founder

== See also ==
- Communes of the Aisne department
