= Otto Karl Lorenz von Pirch =

Prussian general

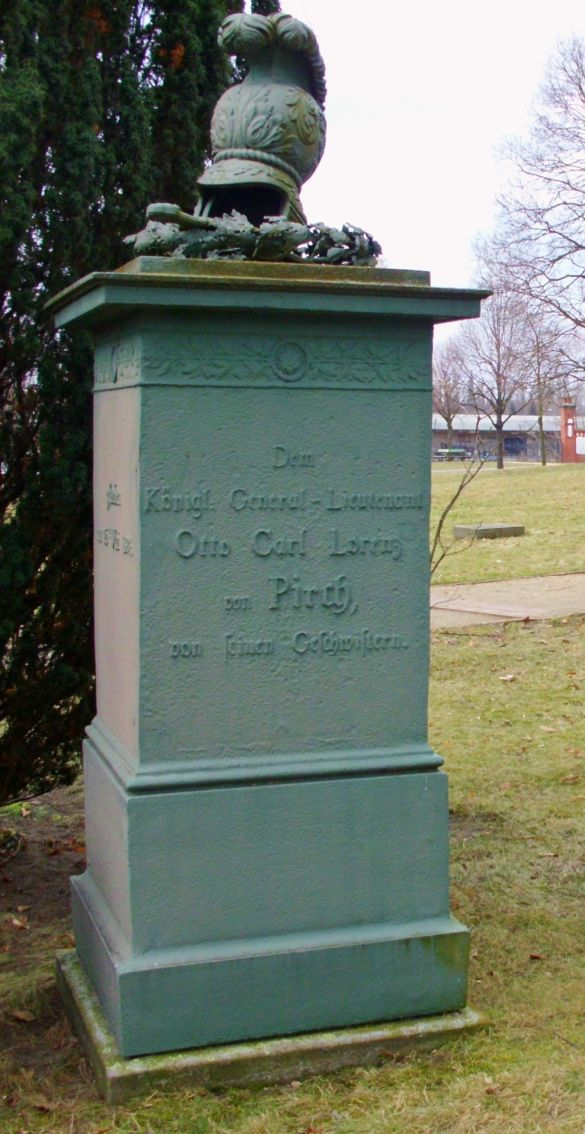
Grave of Pirch at the Invalids' Cemetery

Lieutenant-General Otto Karl Lorenz von Pirch or Pirch II (23 May 1765 in Stettin in Pomerania – 26 May 1824 in Berlin) was a Prussian officer who fought in the Napoleonic Wars. (Note: "Pirch II": the use of Roman numerals being used in Prussian service to distinguish officers of the same name, in this case from his brother, seven years his senior, Georg Dubislav Ludwig von Pirch "Pirch I". Because of this usage in the Prussian service, and because the two fought in the Waterloo Campaign, many English language sources use the same method to distinguish the two.)
