= Waterloo campaign: Ligny through Wavre to Waterloo =

1815 military operation in Belgium

Napoleonic Wars
- Part of The Waterloo campaign
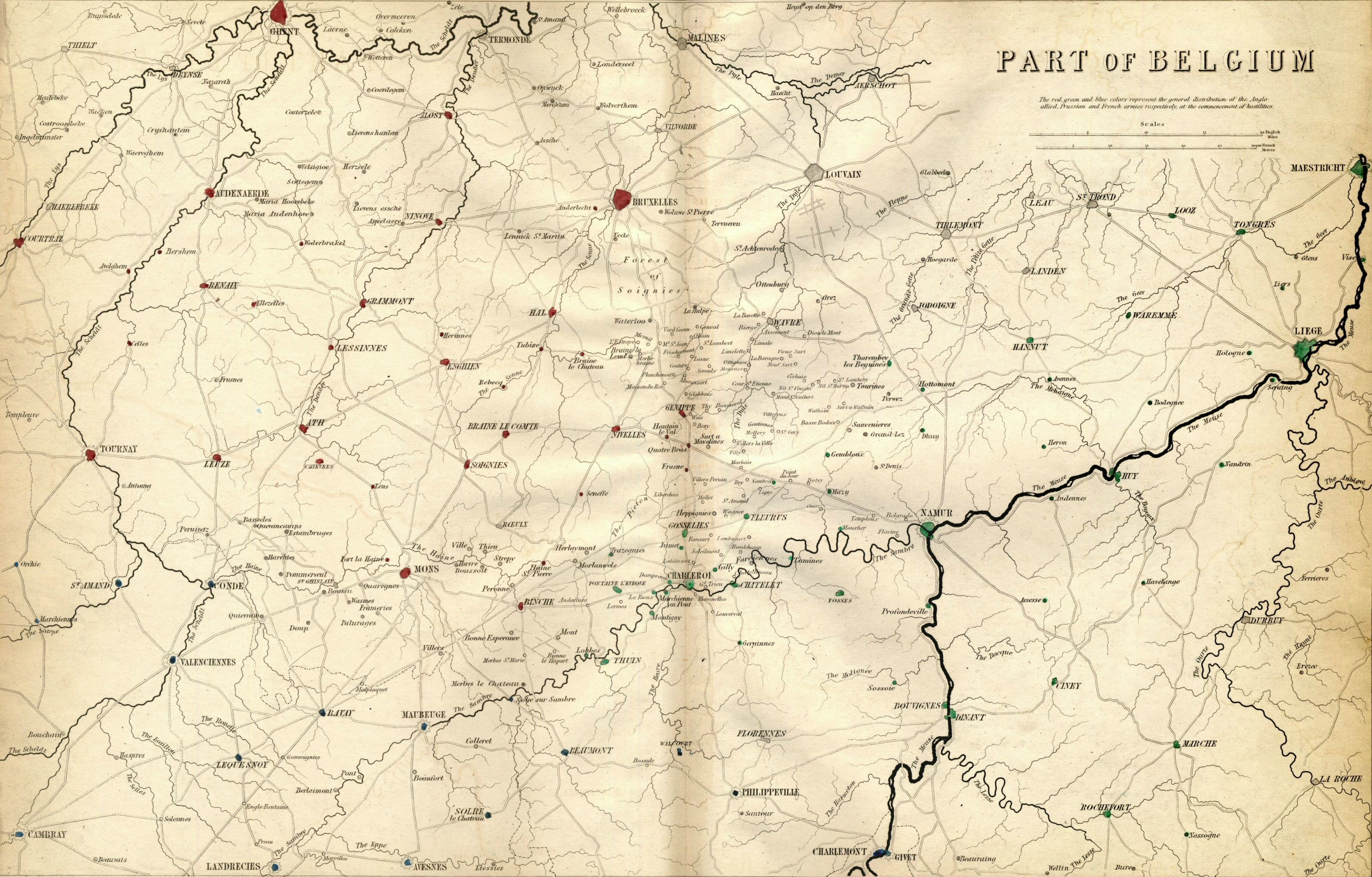
- A portion of Belgium with some places marked in colour to indicate the initial deployments of the armies just before the commencement of hostilities on 15 June 1815: red Anglo-allied, green Prussian, blue French
| Date | 17–18 June 1815 |
| Location | From Ligny through Wavre to Waterloo in Belgium |
| Result | The Prussian army retreats and the French advance, but the Prussians are able to maintain a link with the Anglo-allied army at Waterloo |

Belligerents
| France | Prussia |

Commanders and leaders
| (First French Empire) Napoleon I; (First French Empire) Emmanuel de Grouchy | (Kingdom of Prussia) Gebhard von Blücher |

Strength
| French Army order of battle | Prussian Army order of battle |

On 16 June 1815, the French defeated the Prussians at the Battle of Ligny. The Prussians successfully disengaged and withdrew north to Wavre where they regrouped, and later advanced westward with three corps to attack the right flank of the French army at the Battle of Waterloo. The French were slow to exploit Ligny; Napoleon wasted the morning of 17 June with a late breakfast and touring the previous day's battlefield before organising a pursuit of the two Coalition armies. Napoleon and Marshal Michel Ney took the French reserves to pursue the Duke of Wellington's Anglo-allied army. Marshal Emmanuel de Grouchy was ordered to pursue and harry the Prussians and prevent them from regrouping.

Napoleon and Grouchy assumed that the Prussians were retreating towards Namur and Liège to take up a line on the river Meuse. On 17 June, Grouchy sent the bulk of his cavalry ranging in that direction as far as Perwez. From a 22:00 despatch to Napoleon, Grouchy still thought the Prussians were retreating north-east although by then he knew that two Prussian corps were heading north towards Wavre. From another despatch four hours later, Grouchy intended to advance to either Corbais or Wavre. However, at the end of 17 June his detachment was behind the Prussians, on the far side of the Dyle; Grouchy could neither prevent the Prussians at Wavre from moving to Waterloo, nor regroup with Napoleon on 18 June at Waterloo.

On the morning of 18 June, the remaining Prussians crossed the Dyle in and around Wavre and headed westwards towards Waterloo. Grouchy was at Sart-lez-Walhain when at about 11:30 he and his staff heard cannonades from the Battle of Waterloo, 23 kilometres (14 mi) to the northwest; a local notary gave them an accurate location of the source of the sound. There were no direct roads from Grouchy to the battle, but there was a road to Wavre, 13 kilometres (8.1 mi) away to the north-northwest. Grouchy moved on Wavre, arriving at 16:00. At the Battle of Wavre, the French defeated the Prussian rearguard, the Prussian III Corps commanded by Johann von Thielemann, which had been about to leave for Waterloo.

The Prussian advance to Waterloo was impeded by swollen streams, which turned their valleys into muddy swamps, in particular the small river Lasne close to Saint-Lambert. Napoleon neglected to screen his right flank and failed to detect the Prussian's approach. At around 17:00 on 18 June, the Prussian vanguard started to arrive at Waterloo in strength from the Wood of Paris; shortly after they were attacking the right flank of Napoleon's army.

== Ligny to Wavre, 17 June ==
=== Prussian retreat from Ligny ===
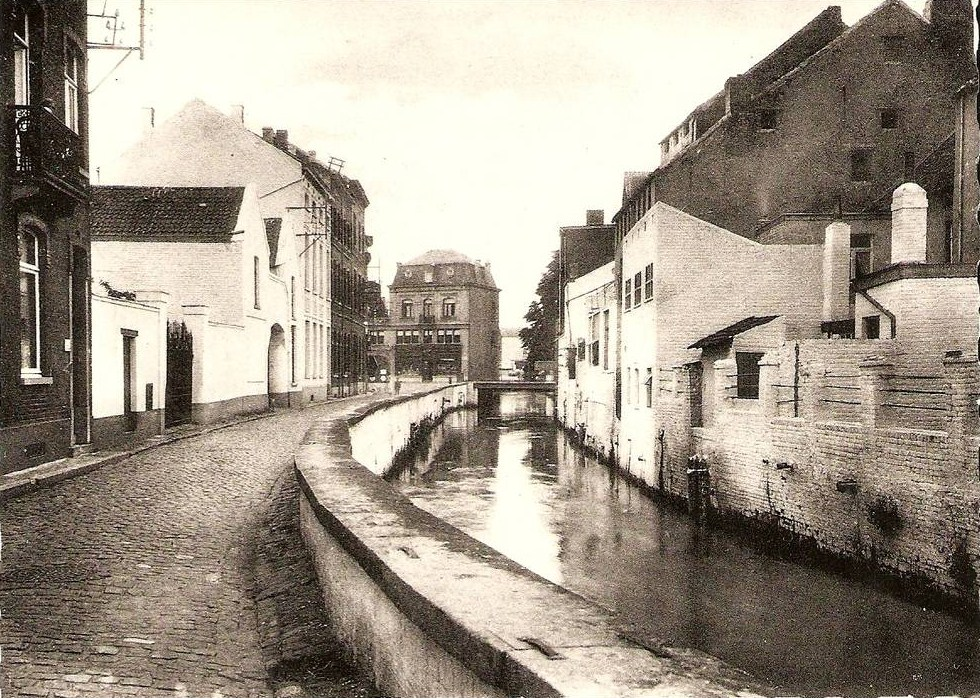
The Dyle river in Wavre (early 20th century).

After the Battle of Ligny, Zieten's Prussian I Corps and Pirch I's (Note: "'Pirch I', the use of Roman numerals being used in Prussian service to distinguish officers of the same name, in this case from his brother, seven years his junior, Otto Karl Lorenz 'Pirch II'") II Corps retired to Tilly and Gentinnes.

On the night of 16 June, Prussian headquarters ordered the army to fall back to Wavre instead of falling back along lines of communication toward Prussia; by doing so, Field Marshal Gebhard Leberecht von Blücher retained the option of linking-up with the Anglo-allied army. I and II Corps were ordered to Bierges and Saint-Anne. (Note: Three locations appear on Kaart van Ferraris close together: Bruyère Sainte Anne, Chapelle Sainte Anne, and Cense de Sainte Anne 50.70098°N 4.62035°E about 2 kilometres (1.2 mi) south of Aisémont.) Thielemann's III and Bülow's IV Corps at Gembloux and Baudecet (Note: 50.59620°N 4.71192°E Siborne names "Baudecet" "Basse Bodecée", and Kaart van Ferraris "Bassebodecé".) received the order on the morning of 17 June to move and bivouac at Bawette (Note: 50.72943°N 4.59624°E (2 kilometres (1.2 mi) north of Wavre). Siborne and Kaart van Ferraris calls it "La Bavette".) and Dion-le-Mont near Wavre.

I and II Corps passed through Mont-Saint-Guibert. II Corps deployed as rearguard in a defile behind the settlement. I Corps arrived at Wavre around noon, crossed the Dyle, and took up positions at Bierges. II Corps followed, but took up position on the right bank of the Dyle, between Sainte Anne and Aisémont.

A cavalry brigade with half a horse battery, commanded by Lieutenant Colonel Eston von Sohr, from II Corps acted as rearguard for I and II Corps. It was ordered to take up a concealed position between Tilly and Gentinnes and observe French movements, and fall back to the defile at Mont-Saint-Guibert when engaged.

Also that night, Colonel von Röhl, superintendent of the army's Ordnance Department, set out for Wavre to organize any artillery arriving there for action. His aide-de-camp went to Gembloux to move the army's reserve ammunition wagons to Wavre. Additional precautions were taken. Urgent orders for ammunition were sent to Maastricht, Cologne, Wesel, and Münster. Orders went to Liège to move the siege train to Maastricht, and to destroy the iron foundry at the arsenal.

General Friedrich Wilhelm von Jagow's detachment had held Byre during the night. At first light on 17 June, it began moving to Gembloux by way of Sombreffe, and arrived before III Corps. After receiving the retreat order, Jagow directed the detachment's units back to their brigades.

=== Prussian III Corps joins IV Corps at Gembloux ===
Prussian III Corps remained in place for much of 16 June, which covered the retreat through Gembloux.

Blücher was recovering from his fall at the Battle of Ligny. It was Gneisenau, Blücher's chief-of-staff, (Note: Hofschröer presents a case that by Waterloo, because of his age and fragile mental state, Blücher was a figurehead and that Gneisenau was to all intense and purposes in operational command of the campaign.) who gave III Corps the option of retreating by Tilly or Gembloux. Thielemann chose Gembloux, as he knew that the French held Saint-Amand, Ligny, and the Ligny battlefield up to Sombreffe.

The widely dispersed III Corps regrouped during the night of 16 June; the manoeuvre was protracted. It was not until 02:00 on 17 June that the head of the column, made of the reserve artillery, reached the Nivelles–Namur/Fleurus–Gembloux crossroad and the Gembloux road. (Note: 50.52424°N 4.61964°E At the time there was a hamlet called Point-du-Jour at the crossroads of what is now the crossroads N93 and N29 in suburb of Sombreffe.) The corps' main body reached Gembloux at 06:00.

III Corps' rearguard—Borcke's 8th Infantry Brigade and Hobe's III Corps Cavalry (the reserve cavalry)—took up position along the Namur road, facing south down the Fleurus chaussée (high road) toward the French. The rearguard withdrew at 04:00.

IV Corps' vanguard reached Baudecet by the old Roman at nightfall on 16 June. Bülow learned of the Battle of Ligny, and ordered brigades posted at intervals along the road. Hake's 13th Brigade was bivouacked to the rear, near Hotomont (Note: Siborne names "Hotomont" "Hottoment and Kaart van Ferraris "Hottomont".) where the road intersected with the Namur-Louvain road. In the morning, IV Corps was posted about 4.8 kilometres (3 mi) to the rear of Grembloux on the Roman road.

As III Corps approached Gembloux, it learned of IV Corps' position. Major Karl von Weyrach, Blücher's aide-de-camp, and who had accompanied III Corps through the night, left to report the status of both corps to army headquarters; he found it at Mellery. (Note: Peter Hofschröer calls this place Mellery, Siborne Mélioreux, and another 19th-century alternative spelling is Mellorie.) III Corps halted on the other side of the town. Neither Thielemann nor Bülow knew where I and II Corps were. Writing to Bülow, Thielemann said that he had no new orders from Blücher, but believed the army was retreating to Saint-Trond. Furthermore, III Corps had not been followed by the French, but he had heard distant firing on the right, which he concluded was connected with Duke of Wellington's Anglo-allied Army.

With two corps available, the Prussians could contest a French pursuit toward Gembloux.

=== Cavalry skirmish along the Namur road ===
The Prussians were too far away to easily follow by the time the French organized a pursuit. The French detached Pajol (Note: Pajol was commander of the I Cavalry Reserve Corps) and the 4th Cavalry Division of his light Cavalry Corps to pursue. The division, led by Pierre Soult, consisted of Clary's 1st, Blot's 4th, and Liégeard's 5th Hussars; they struck down the Namur road. They were supported by Lieutenant General Baron François Antoine Teste's 21st Infantry Division of Lobau's VI Corps, which took up position on the heights above Mazy.

4th Cavalry Division quickly encountered a Prussian force composed of Horse Battery No. 14 and a squadron of the 7th Uhlans. The horse battery, from II Corps, had retired during the Battle of Ligny after running out of ammunition but had not found the reserve ammunition wagons; it had neither returned to II Corps or withdrawn with III Corps, instead "uselessly driving first in one direction, and then in another". The Uhlans, from III Corps, had been posted at Onoz and had not received recall orders. The French captured all of the Prussian guns, with the Uhlans losing 30 men before escaping. The skirmish gave the French the impression that the Prussians were retreating toward Namur.

=== Prussian III Corps and IV Corps retreat to Wavre ===
At about 09:30, Weyrach arrived at IV Corps headquarters with orders from army headquarters for IV Corps to move to Dion-le-Mont, near Wavre, by Walhain and Corbais (Note: Siborne spells "Corbais" "Corbaix") (Note: Hofschröer states that to avoid entanglement Thielemann and Bülow had already agreed between themselves and that the IV Corps retreated via Tourinnes and Corroy-le-Grand while the III Corps would march via Walhain and through Corbais.) The orders also defined the corps' rearguard. The main body of the rearguard—ultimately 14th Brigade—was to be posted at Vieux-Sart. Furthermore, a detachment of a regiment of cavalry, two battalions of infantry, and two guns of horse artillery was to be sent to Mont-Saint-Guibert to reinforce, and then cover the withdrawal of, I and II Corps' rearguard; this detachment was commanded by Lieutenant Colonel Ledebur and composed of the 10th Hussars, the fusilier battalions of the 11th Regiment of Infantry and 1st Regiment of Pomeranian Landwehr, and two guns from Horse Battery No. 12.

The main body of the IV Corps moved directly to Dion-le-Mont. It took up position on the height near that town, near the intersection of the roads leading to Louvain, Wavre, and Gembloux.

III Corps began moving at 14:00; it arrived at Wavre late in the evening and took up positions at Bawette. General Borcke's 9th Infantry Brigade and Colonel Count Lottum's Cavalry Brigade remained on the right bank of the Dyle. Other units rejoined the main body at Wavre: Colonel Marwitz' Cavalry Brigade which had withdrawn through Tilly, the 2nd Battalion of the 3rd Kurmark Landwehr and the two squadrons of the 6th Kurmark Landwehr Cavalry from Dinant, and the survivors of the 7th Uhlans squadron from Onoz. The corps' two squadrons from the 9th Hussars had not yet arrived from Ciney.

=== Prussian headquarters retreats to Wavre ===
Prussian army headquarters relocated to Wavre early on 17 June. Blücher was still recovering from his injuries and remained bedridden for the rest of the day.

Late in the morning, Lieutenant Massow made a round trip as messenger between the Prussians and the Anglo-allies. He notified the Anglo-allies that the Prussians were retreating to Wavre, and then returned with a message from Wellington for Blücher. Wellington intended to retreat to Waterloo, and requested the support of two Prussian corps so he could give battle. Blücher did not reply immediately. The request was viewed favourably but the Prussian army was still regrouping on Wavre and Blücher did not yet know what he could promise. It was not known if IV Corps would join the army on 17 June. I and II Corps needed ammunition, but its supply had been directed to Grembloux. For the moment, the Prussians maintained their position near the Dyle, with VI Corps at Mont-Saint-Guibert as vanguard.

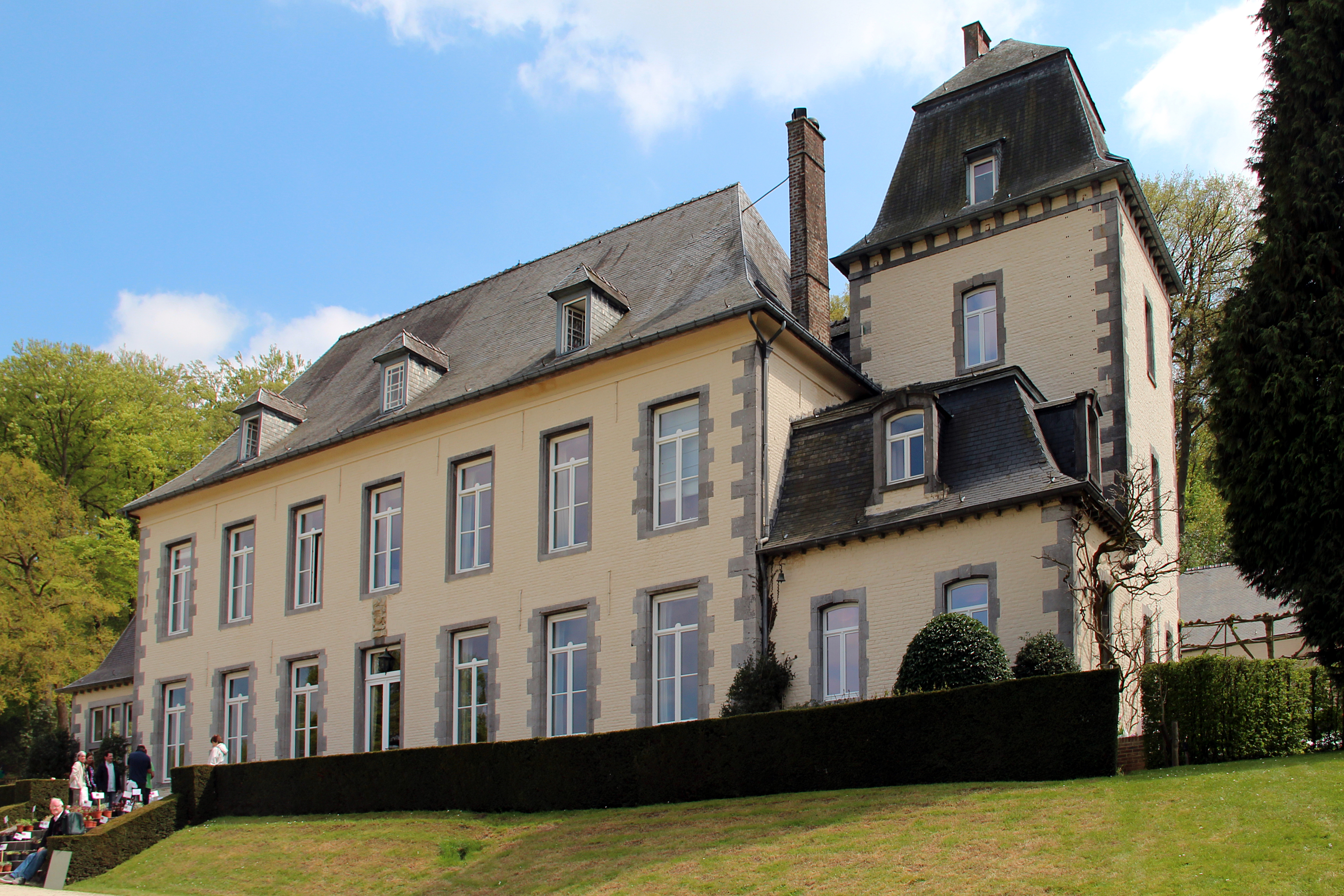
Abbey of Aywiers in the village of Couture-Saint-Germain.

During the day, Major Falkenhausen conducted reconnaissance toward Genappe from Céroux. (Note: 50.66060°N 4.53028°E Kaart van Ferraris "Seroulx" -- near Ottignies.) He observed the French advance along the Genappe-Brussels high road from woods beyond Céroux. Prussian patrols were sent toward Lasne, Couture-Saint-Germain, and Aywiers, to observe the defiles along the streams of the Lasne.

=== French reconnaissance and inactivity ===
The Prussian retreat, in good order and along routes where only minor roads (as opposed to high roads) were available, was met by French inactivity. At dawn on 17 June, French vedettes were within 0.80 kilometres (.5 mi) of Prussian III Corps' rearguard. The French did not conduct patrols, and missed the opportunity to observe the direction of the rearguard's withdrawal after sunrise. Pajol's detachment, perhaps suspecting Namur was not the direction of the Prussian retreat, went to Saint-Denis where it regrouped with the 21st Infantry Division. A brigade from Exelmans' Heavy Cavalry Corps was sent to reinforce Pajol's detachment; based on updated intelligence, it redirected en route to Gembloux and discovered traces of the Prussian retreat.

In the morning, Marshal Emmanuel de Grouchy, acting commander of the Right Wing of the French Army, travelled to meet Napoleon at the emperor's quarters at Fleurus; the marshal was responding to a summons from the previous evening. At 08:00 and 09:00, Napoleon, accompanied by Grouchy, started a tour of the surrounding area; he visited officers, troops, and the battlefield at Ligny. At one point, he had a lengthy conversation with Grouchy and Gérard—commander of the IV Corps—about domestic politics and other subjects unconnected with the campaign.

=== French main army divides ===
Grouchy's detachment
| Unit | Commander | Troops | | | | Guns |
| Unit | Commander | Infantry | Cavalry | Gunners | Total | Guns |
|---|---|---|---|---|---|---|
| III Corps | General Count Vandamme | 14,508 | 0 | 936 | | 32 |
| IV Corps | General Count Gérard | 12,589 | 2,366 | 1,538 | | 38 |
| 21st Division (VI Corps) | Lieutenant General Baron Teste | 2,316 | 0 | 161 | | 8 |
| 4th Division (I Cavalry Corps) | Lieutenant General Count Pajol | 0 | 1,234 | 154 | | 6 |
| II Cavalry Corps | Lieutenant General Count Exelmans | 0 | 2,817 | 246 | | 12 |
| Initial strength | | 29,413 | 6,417 | 3,035 | 38,870 | 96 |
| Losses on 16 June | | 3,900 | 800 | 400 | 5,100 | 0 |
| Strength on morning of 17 June | | 25,513 | 5,617 | 2,635 | 33,765 | 96 |

By noon on 17 June, Napoleon had received reconnaissance reports toward Quatre Bras, and learned of the Prussian concentration at Gembloux. The army was divided between these two targets. He made the first changes to the disposition of the French army since sending Pajol's detachment to pursue the Prussians toward Namur.

For an attack on Quatre Bras, forces would stage in front of Marbais astride the Namur road. The assigned formations were:

- Lobau's VI Infantry Corps, minus 21st Division which was supporting Pajol's detachment.
- Milhaud's IV Cavalry Reserve Corps (a corps of Heavy Cavalry Cuirassiers), along with Lieutenant General Baron Subervie's Light Cavalry Division (detached from Pajol's I Cavalry Reserve Corps)
- Lieutenant General Baron Domon's 3rd Light Cavalry Division (of II Corps)
- Imperial Guard, both cavalry and infantry.

A detachment composed mainly of III Corps, IV Corps, and II Cavalry Corps was assigned to Grouchy to pursue the Prussians. This was sufficient to probe Prussian movements, maintain communication with the main French army, and affect withdrawal if sorely pressed; it was not meant to fight the entire Prussian army. 7th Infantry Division, commanded by Lieutenant General Girard, of II Corps had suffered heavy casualties the day before and was left at Ligny.

Napoleon's orders were:

"Pursue the Prussians, complete their defeat by attacking them as soon as you come up with them, and never let them out of your sight. I am going to unite the remainder of this portion of the Army with Marshal Ney's Corps, to march against the English, and to fight them if they should hold their ground between this and the Forest of Soignies. You will communicate with me by the paved road which leads to Quatre Bras."

The Prussian's main line of retreat was still unknown to the French. Napoleon believed the Prussians were retreating toward Namur and Liège, and to a line on the Meuse. From there, the Prussians could threaten the right flank of a French advance on Brussels. Grouchy believed pursuit was not worthwhile as the Prussians were now many hours ahead of the French, having started to retreat at 22:00 the previous night; he could not convince Napoleon to allow him to go to Quatre Bras with the main French army.

Once arrangements with Grouchy were complete, Napoleon ordered the army at Marbais to advance. 5th Light Cavalry Division acted as vanguard, and the French reached Quatre Bras at about 14:00. By that time, the infantry of the Anglo-allied army had crossed the Dyle and were retreating along high road to Brussels. The French engaged the covering Anglo-allied cavalry.

=== Prussian rearguard retreats to Mont-Saint-Guibert ===
French movement through Byre toward Quatre Bras was observed by Sohr's Prussian I/II Corps rearguard. Sohr retained a cavalry brigade, which was held to the rear of Tilly. Shortly afterwards, the Prussians began slowly pulling back to Mont-Saint-Guibert in response to the approach of French dragoons from Exelmans' II Cavalry Corps. The French skirmishers slowed the Prussians by forcing them to take frequent precautions against attack; the French abandoned the chase as night fell. Ledebur's IV Corps rearguard was waiting at Mont-Saint-Guibert when Sohr's detachment arrived in the evening of 17 June; Ledebur passed on orders to defend the defile.

=== Grouchy advances to Gembloux ===
After Napoleon's departure, Grouchy ordered III and IV Corps to move to junction of the Gembloux and Namur roads and then - after receiving reports of significant Prussian movement through Gembloux - onto Gembloux. In the meantime, Grouchy went to the advanced posts of Exelmans' dragoons, which were now beyond Gembloux. III and IV Corps reached Gembloux very late in the evening; III Corps was posted in front, and IV Corps to the rear, of the town. 6th Light Cavalry Division, commanded by Brigadier General Louis Vallin after Lieutenant General Antoine Maurin was wounded at the Battle of Ligny, was stationed nearby on the right bank of the Orneau.

The 1st Brigade of Lieutenant General Chastel's 10th Cavalry Division, consisting of the 4th and 12th Dragoons, under Brigadier General Bonnemain, was pushed on to Sart-lez-Walhain. (Note: 50.61484°N 4.71862°E. "Sart-lez-Walhain" is named by Siborne as "Sart-à-Wallain", Hofschröer as Sart-à-Walhain; and by Kaart van Ferraris as "Sart Awalhain".) 15th Dragoons, from General Vincent's Brigade of the 9th Cavalry Division, under Lieutenant General Baron Strolz), were detached to Perwez. (Note: Hofschröer spells this place Perwez as does the Kaart van Ferraris, Siborne spells it "Perwtès".) These units reported that the Prussians had retired toward Wavre.

21st Infantry Division, accompanied by Pajol's cavalry detachment, returned to its morning starting position of Mazy from Saint-Denis. Siborne states that there was no satisfactory explanation for this movement.

Grouchy wrote a despatch to Napoleon dated 10:00 on 17 June. He gave his disposition around Gembloux, and a less accurate assessment of Prussian movements. According to Grouchy, from Sauvenières one Prussian column went to Wavre, perhaps to link up with the Anglo-allies, while the main Prussian body went to Perwez en route to Liège. Finally, a column of Prussian artillery went to Namur. Grouchy reported he would follow the main Prussian body, which at that time seemed like either to Wavre or Perwez. Siborne states that the despatch "was well calculated to satisfy Napoleon, that at least the spirit of his instructions had been understood by the Marshal."

At 02:00 on 18 June, Grouchy sent another to Napoleon reporting that he would advance upon either Corbais or Wavre.

=== Prussians regroup at Wavre ===
At 17:00 on 17 June, the Prussian reserve ammunition wagons reached Wavre, and the army was resupplied. By the evening, the Prussian army was positioned around Wavre. Two corps were on each side of the Dyle and ready to resume operations. The rearguards remained at Vieux-Sart and Mont-Saint-Guibert, and withdrew without difficulty the next day. The only units still in transit were Borcke's 9th Brigade, Hacke's 13th Brigade, and Hobe's reserve cavalry from III Corps; they arrived in Wavre by 06:00 the next day. Patrols were sent toward the main Namur-Louvain road, and up the river to maintain contact with the rearguard at Mont-Saint-Guibert. A detachment from I Corps provided flank protection at Limal. The defiles of the Lasne were patrolled during the evening. According to William Siborne, morale and confidence in Blücher's leadership remained high.

With preparations completed, Blücher replied to Wellington's request for reinforcements. Blücher pledged the support of his entire army. His only condition was that the Coalition would attack on the 19th if the French did not attack first on the 18th. Before midnight, Blücher was notified by a despatch from General Karl Freiherr von Müffling—attached to the Anglo-allied headquarters—that the Anglo-allied army was deployed at Waterloo—from Braine l'Alleud on the right to near La Haye on the left—and awaiting the arrival of the French army and Prussian reinforcements.

From midnight, the army received orders for the advance on Waterloo. IV Corps, followed and supported by II Corps, would advance to Chapelle-Saint-Lambert at dawn; they would attack the French right flank if serious fighting had already started, otherwise they were to conceal their strength. IV Corps would leave an observation detachment at Mont-Saint-Guibert, which would gradually fall back to Wavre if attacked, and send any baggage unnecessary for the battle to Louvain. I and III Corps would be ready to follow IV Corps if necessary. The plan was despatched to Müffling—to forward to Wellington—with an explanation that troop fatigue prevented earlier movement.

The Coalition armies were ready to link-up at Waterloo on 18 June, unlike the main French army and Grouchy's detachment.

== Wavre to Waterloo, 18 June ==
=== Grouchy chooses Wavre instead of Waterloo ===
The French began moving on Wavre on the morning of 18 June.

At 05:00, Pajol's cavalry detachment and 21st Infantry Division set out from Mazy for Saint-Denis and Grand-Leez, (Note: Siborne spells "Grand-Leez" "Grand-Lez".) to Tourinnes where they awaited further orders.

Grouchy's detachment also started moving. The Heavy Cavalry Corps, consisting of eight regiments of dragoons, set out at around 08:00. III and IV Corps began moving along the same road through Sart-lez-Walhain, (Note: 50.61484°N 4.71862°E. "Sart-lez-Walhain" is named by Siborne as "Sart-à-Wallain", Hofschröer as Sart-à-Walhain; and by Kaart van Ferraris as "Sart Awalhain".) toward Wavre at around 09:00; the corps' left flank was protected by the 6th Light Cavalry Division, which advanced toward the Dyle. III and IV Corps' march was slowed by poor roads, and narrow and miry defiles. Gérard, going ahead of IV Corps, arrived at Sart-lez-Walhain at 11:00, where he found Grouchy taking breakfast in the house of M. Hollaëbt, a notary.

At around 10:30, Heavy Cavalry Corps' vanguard met the Prussian rearguard on the road to Wavre. The French cavalry formed a 3.2 kilometres (2 mi) line from a wooded ravine near the Farm of La Plaquerie, (Note: 50.66791°N 4.60134°E "Cue de la Ploquerie" on Kaart van Ferraris.) to a point about 0.5 kilometres (0.31 mi)) south of Vieux-Sart toward Neuf-Sart. As skirmishers engaged, Exelmans sent Chef d'escadron d'Estourmel to update Grouchy and advise that the Prussians had retreated toward Wavre during part of the night and morning for closer communication with the Anglo-allies.

At about 11:30, Colonel Simon Lorière—Grouchy's chief of staff—heard a distant but violent cannonade coming from Waterloo while walking in the garden, and notified Grouchy. Grouchy went into the garden with several officers, including Gérard, Vandamme, Exelmans. Hollaëbt was summoned and asked to identify the direction of the sound; he pointed to the Forest of Soignies and replied that it was coming from the vicinity of Plancenoit (Note: Plancenoit is spelt Planchenoit by Siborne.) and Mont-Saint-Jean.

Gérard favoured moving immediately toward the sound to better support Napoleon, and volunteered IV Corps. General Baltus of the artillery disagreed, perhaps worried by the difficulties of moving the guns. General Valaze, commanding the engineers of Gérard's corps, initially agreed with Baltus but noted that he had three companies of sappers to remove obstacles, which gave Gérard confidence that guns carriages and limbers could be moved.

Grouchy was determined to follow Napoleon's instructions to prosecute the Prussians, and rejected Gérard's strategy. Grouchy believed his detachment had just encountered the rearguard of the Prussian infantry. Furthermore, Blücher's intentions were unclear; the Prussians could decide to fight at Wavre, or continue retreating toward Brussels, or - if attempting to join the Anglo-allies - move in front or behind of the Forest of Soignies. The detachment would go to Wavre. Grouchy justified his decision after the campaign. Fundamentally, he saw his responsibility as the execution of Napoleon's instructions; sending even a part of the detachment toward Forest of Soignies would have been in contravention of those orders. Furthermore, it would have been difficult for separated parts of the detachment to support each other near the Dyle; the river was swollen by rain and its banks were swampy.

As Grouchy moved to join the vanguard, he received a message from Napoleon that confirmed his decision. The message, written at the Farm of Caillou on 18 June at 10:00, warned of the impending attack on the Anglo-Allied army at Waterloo, and instructed Grouchy to move toward Napoleon from Wavre and to maintain close communication. Grouchy did not act immediately on the new instructions. No measures were taken to either detect possible Prussian movement toward Waterloo, or establish closer communication with the main French army. Grouchy conducted a direct advance on Wavre. The left flank was neglected. The Heavy Cavalry Corps was ordered to take up position on the right at Dion-le-Mont, with its position taken over by 6th Light Cavalry Division.

=== Prussians depart for Waterloo ===
Before dawn, Major Witowsky led a detachment from the 2nd Silesian Hussars to Maransart to scout the defiles of the Lasne, and the area beyond toward the French; they encountered a French patrol at Maransart. Falkenhausen also send reconnaissance parties to the Lasne, which also maintained communication with the detachment at Mont-Saint-Guibert; they found the defiles free of the French. French movement between the Dyle and the Charleroi high road was accurately observed and reported. The Prussian patrols forced French messengers to avoid the area, thus lengthening the line of communication between the main French army and Grouchy's detachment.

At daybreak on 18 June, Prussian IV Corps began to move from near Dion-le-Mont to Saint-Lambert through Wavre. The vanguard consisted of General Losthin's 15th Brigade, the 2nd Silesian Hussars, and a twelve-pounder battery. The vanguard reached Saint-Lambert by 11:00, then crossed the soft and muddy valley before halting in the Wood of Paris. (Note: Wood of Paris is located at 50.68164°N 4.46786°E) Hussar patrols went to scout the Anglo-allied and French eastern flanks.

A Prussian patrol with a staff officer made contact with a squadron of the British 10th Hussars, commanded by Captain Taylor, posted at Smohain. The staff officer had a report for Wellington, which Taylor ordered relayed by Lieutenant Lindsey. The report stated that Bülow was at Saint-Lambert and was advancing with IV Corps, although this was an overstatement as only the corps' vanguard had reached Saint-Lambert at the time.

The remainder of IV Corps was delayed by a fire that broke out in Wavre after the vanguard passed. The fire spread rapidly and put ammunition wagons at risk. The 1st Battalion of the 14th Regiment, under Major Löwenfeld, and the 7th Pioneer Company extinguished the fire. Hiller's 16th and Hacke's 13th Brigades arrived at Saint-Lambert much later than the vanguard. The rearguard, the 14th Brigade, was even farther behind.

Blücher acted immediately upon learning that the right flank of the main French army was exposed, seeing the opportunity to move his army through the Lasne defiles to the Wood of Paris. I Corps was ordered to depart after IV Corps passed through Wavre. It would march by way of Fromont and Ohain and join the Anglo-allied left at La Haye; (Note: 50.69649°N 4.52913°E Fromont was a hamlet south of Rixensart about 1/3 of the way to Profondsart.) I Corps set out at about 12:00 along the left bank of the Dyle. II Corps was ordered to follow IV Corps to Saint-Lambert. III Corps would remain for a time as rearguard in the defile of Wavre, and then follow II Corps. Blücher intended to have the bulk of the army past the defiles of Saint-Lambert before abandoning Wavre.

At 09:30, Blücher send a despatch informing Wellington that he intended to attack the French right flank as soon as possible. Blücher left Wavre before 11:00 to reconnoitre the terrain toward Saint-Lambert from near Limale.

=== French attack Wavre ===
French cavalry penetrated between the Prussian rearguard at Vieux-Sart and Mont-Saint-Guibert when Prussian IV Corps' Reserve Cavalry - following the corps' 13th Infantry Brigade - was passing through Wavre. The Reserve Cavalry immediately detached two regiments—the 2nd Pomeranian, and the 1st Silesian of the Landwehr Cavalry—to counter the French advance. Ledebur's Prussian detachment at Mont-Saint-Guibert began falling back to Wavre upon learning of the French advance. Sohr's Prussian detachment, which had withdrawn from Mont-Saint-Guibert in the morning, sent a brigade of 150 cavalry and two horse artillery guns to reinforce Ledebur. Ledebur's detachment linked up with the IV Corps' Reserve Cavalry regiments and Sohr's cavalry brigade; they reached Farm de Auzel (Note: 50.68563°N 4.63869°E. About 0.5 kilometres (0.31 mi) north-east of Vieux-Sart) after a "slight affair" with French III Corps.

Around noon, Prussian II Corps began moving from between Saint-Anne and Aisémont, (Note: Three locations appear on Kaart van Ferraris close together: Bruyère Sainte Anne, Chapelle Sainte Anne, and Cense de Sainte Anne 50.70098°N 4.62035°E, about 2 kilometres (1.2 mi) south of Aisémont.) on the right bank of the Dyle, through the defile toward Wavre for a river crossing. Progress was slow as the corps crowded into the defile. At Wavre, the garrison of 1st Battalion of the 14th Regiment, II Corps, was relieved by a battalion of the 30th Regiment, Prussian III Corps.

While underway, II Corps was notified by Sohr's detachment—the corps rearguard—of the French advance consisting of six cavalry regiments of, ten artillery pieces, and two strong columns of infantry. By this time, the Wood of Sarats, (Note: 0.69063°N 4.64658°E. Only a small remnant still exists of the Wood of Sarats) close to the Farm of Auzel, was occupied by battalions of the 8th Brigade, II Corps, commanded by Colonel Reckow. (Note: Reckow took command of the 23rd Regiment during the battle of Ligny replacing Colonel Langen.) Pirch put General Brause, commander of the 7th Brigade, in command of the rearguard, and reinforced Sohr's detachment with the 11th Hussars and four pieces of horse artillery. Brause posted the remaining battalions of the 8th Brigade in rear of the wood, the three cavalry regiments on the right, and Foot Battery No. 12 in front. The 7th Brigade, deployed into line, remained in reserve.

The French "did not advance with much vigour" and the Prussian's withdrew in perfect order. Ledebur's detachment withdrew slowly before the French and linked up with 8th Brigade; 8th Brigade maintained position until 15:00 against the vanguard of French III Corps. General Brause ordered the retreat between 15:00 and 16:00. Sohr's detachment and then the II Corps reserve cavalry regiments crossed the bridge at the Mill of Bierges, (Note: 50.69680°N 4.58566°E: The Mill of Bierges was located at what is now "Rue du Moulin à Eau 11, 1300 Wavre, Belgium" (south-west of Wavre town centre)) which was occupied by two companies of the 2nd Battalion, 14th Regiment. Sohr's detachment only rejoined II Corps at Waterloo. The Fusilier Battalion of the 1st Pomeranian Landwehr, commanded by Major Krüger, distinguished itself during the withdrawal. After the river crossing was completed, the 1st Battalion of the Elbe Landwehr remained at Bierges until the bridge was destroyed and the mill set on fire. The 11th Hussars and the 2nd Battalion of the Elbe Landwehr remained to observe the Dyle crossings and did not rejoin their corps before the following day.

Blücher learned of the French advance on Wavre while near Limale. He ordered Prussian III Corps to hold Wavre against a strong French attack; the strength of Grouchy's attacking French detachment was unknown to the Prussians. If the French crossed the Dyle upstream or did not attack in strength, III Corps was to leave a few battalions in the town and rejoin the main army in the direction of Couture-Saint-Germain as the reserve. The order was relayed by Colonel Clausewitz, Chief of the Staff of III Corps. Vandamme's French III Corps attacked Wavre at 16:00 as Prussian III Corps was leaving Wavre.

=== Prussians advance to the Wood of Paris ===
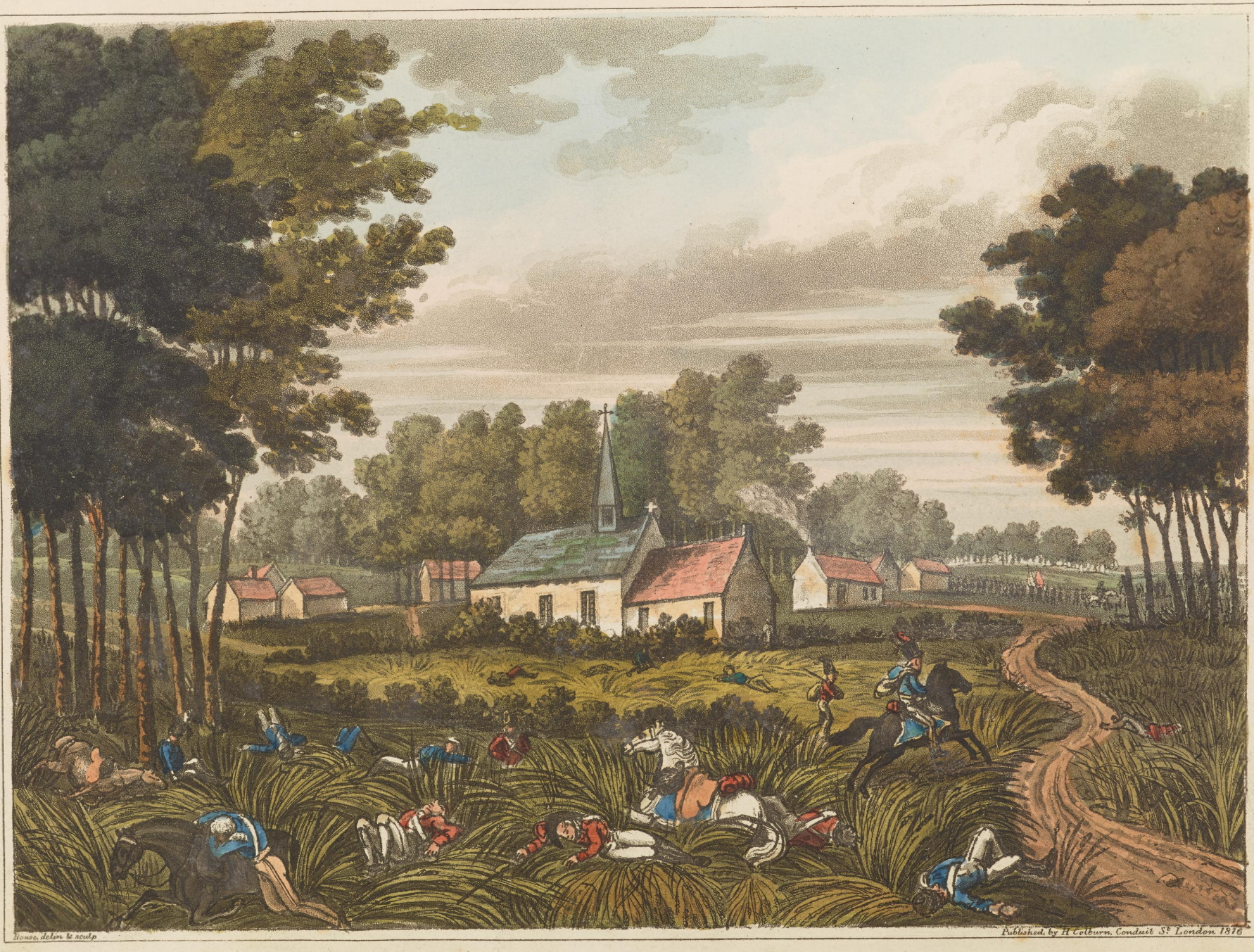
Châteaux Frischermont, shortly after the Battle of Waterloo.

A detachment of the 2nd Silesian Hussars and staff officer Major Lützow, was sent to scout the right front of the Prussian advance in the direction of the French right flank at Waterloo. They reached the Wood of Paris and discovered that the French right flank was completely exposed. A Prussian troop of Hussars advanced beyond the Wood of Paris to near Frischermont, where it had a good view of the Waterloo battlefield; the troop also did not encounter any French forces.

The Prussians had the opportunity to quickly occupy the Wood of Paris. Lützow, on his way to report to Blücher met General Grolman, the Quartermaster General of the Army. Grolman ordered the Silesian Hussars and two battalions of infantry from Bülow's vanguard—the units having just crossed the defile of Saint-Lambert—to immediately take the wood, and sent a despatch to Blücher suggesting that the 15th and 16th Brigades be ordered to follow the vanguard once they had regrouped on the Waterloo side of the defile.

The march through the defile of Saint-Lambert was difficult and exhausting. Rainfall, starting during the afternoon of 17 June and continuing through the night, had turned the valley of the Lasne into a swamp. The roads between Wavre and Saint-Lambert were similarly affected. The columns were drawn out for miles due to frequent stoppages and breaks. Blücher travelled along the line of march to provide encouragement. By 16:00, after considerable difficulty and delay, the 15th and 16th Brigades, and the reserve cavalry and artillery, had reached the plateau between the Lasne and the Smohain. (Note: The Smohain was stream swollen by the overnight rain, that rose close to the village of Smohain, and which flowed thought its own defile.) The plateau sloped steeply downwards toward the streams, but its high ground was comparatively dry and firm and suitable for marching.

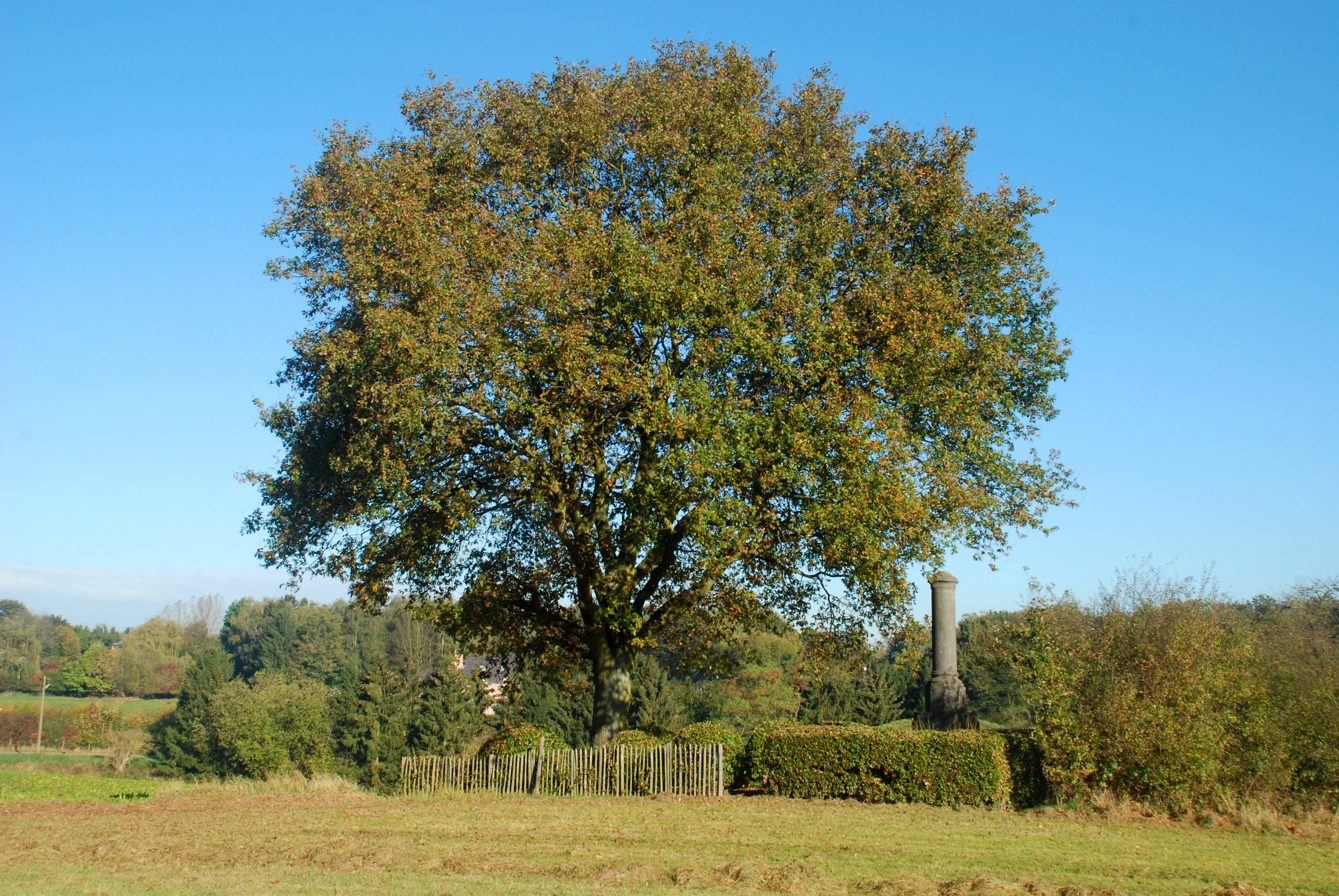
The Monument to Colonel Count von Schwerin.

At the Wood of Paris, the Prussians deployed along a considerable front in a close compact order, on each side of the road leading from Lasne towards Plancenoit. The artillery kept to the road. The cavalry drew up to the rear of the wood to follow the infantry. 15th Brigade deployed at around 15:00, and shortly afterwards its cavalry screen skirmished with a French patrol in which Colonel Schwerin was killed. Schwerin may have been the first Prussian officer killed at the Battle of Waterloo; a memorial now marks the site. (Note: The Monument to Count von Schwerin can still be seen and is located at 50.68444°N 4.47258°E)

Blücher observed the "tremendous cannonade", the renewed French attack at 16:00, and the French reserves behind La Belle Alliance preparing for another attack; he feared that the Anglo-allied line might break if the Prussians waited. Wellingon's frequent and pressing despatches added urgency. Blücher had planned to attack with II and IV Corps (13th and 14th Brigades from IV Corps were expected to join shortly, and II Corps was following along the same line.) Instead, he decided to attack with only what was at the Wood of Paris, and ordered units still on the march to join as quickly as possible.

The Prussian direction of attack was perpendicular to the right flank of the French Army and the Charleroi road, which was the French main line of operation.

At 16:30, 15th and 16th Brigades debouched in typical Prussian brigade formation. 15th Brigade deployed on the right, detaching three battalions (2nd Battalion of the 18th Regiment, the 3rd Battalion of the 3rd Silesian Landwehr, and the 1st Battalion of the 18th Regiment) toward Frischermont and Smohain to cover the right flank. 16th Brigade deployed on the left, with two battalions (3rd battalions of the 15th Regiment and the 1st Silesian Landwehr) under Major Keller to cover the left flank to the Lasne stream. 100 cavalry from the 3rd Regiment of Silesian Landwehr Cavalry, led by Falkenhausen, patrolled beyond the Lasne.

=== Prussians advance from the Wood of Paris ===
During the march from Genappe to La Belle Alliance, the main French army had detached Domon's 3rd Cavalry Division eastward to scout the area between the high road to Brussels and the Dyle. Desmichels' 4th Regiment of Chasseurs pushed as far as the bridge at Mousty, (Note: 50.66077°N 4.56664°E Sliborne calls it "Bridge of Moustier", while the Kaart van Ferraris call the area Moustier and includes the bridge (at its current location) and the nearby Church of Notre-Dame de Mousty) where its skirmishers exchanged a few carbine shots with some Prussian dragoons, who did not engage them further. This allowed Napoleon to surmise that the principal Prussian column—of I and II Corps—had retreated through Tilly and Gentinnes; Grouchy was still unaware of this.

Blücher ordered a cannonade against Domon's detachment, which was forming up en potence at a considerable distance from the Prussian vanguard; this was primarily to announce the Prussian presence and draw French attention away from the Anglo-allies. Domon's entire line advanced to attack, led by a regiment of chasseurs. The Prussian's 2nd Silesian Hussars and the 2nd Neumark Landwehr Cavalry moved forward through the infantry and attacked with the Hussars on the left and the Landwehr on the right; the Prussian cavalry, supported by the 3rd Silesian Landwehr Cavalry, attacked and drove back the chasseurs before retreating to avoid being flanked by the advancing French line. The Prussian cavalry were covered by Horse Battery No. 11, and Captain Schmidt's Foot Battery of the 15th Brigade which drew up to oppose a French pursuit. The French declined to follow up their attack because of the Prussian battery fire and the advancing Prussian infantry.

By now, the battalions of Prussian 15th Brigade's flank guard of had reached Smohain. They had advanced so cautiously that their appearance from the south-eastern part of the village surprised both nearby Anglo-allied and French troops. The Prussian battalions crossed the principal fence separating them from the French extreme right, and at 17:30 drew up in line almost at right angles with the direction of the French front—two battalions in line, with the third in support; this marked the full engagement of the Prussians at the Battle of Waterloo.

== Analysis ==
=== Losing track of the Prussians ===
Historian Peter Hofschröer states that Napoleon's defeat at Waterloo was directly caused by the French losing track of the Prussians.

Siborne finds it inexplicable that Napoleon failed to exploit French advantages on the morning of 17 June. Beside the picket at Gentinnes, the Prussian front was clear as far as Gembloux. The Anglo-allies were still at Quatre Bras with their left flank exposed due to the Prussian retreat. There was nothing stopping the French from moving through the defile of Genappe and into Anglo-allied rear, followed by an attack on the Anglo-allied left and rear at Quatre Bras. The French army was no more fatigued than their opponents; the Anglo-allied had force marched to Quatre Bras. Napoleon later led the comparatively fresh Imperial Guard and VI Corps to Quatre Bras to attack the Anglo-allies with Marshal Michel Ney; this attack was strangely delayed, and only caused minor cavalry skirmishes between the French vanguard and the rearguard of the retreating Anglo-allies. Napoleon campaign depended on defeating his opponents in detail, but the required aggressiveness failed to materialize; Siborne notes that it was a sharp contrast to Napoleon's performance the previous year.

An earlier dispatch of Grouchy's detachment on the morning of 17 June, and a more vigorous pursuit on Grouchy's part, may have caught Prussian III Corps at Gembloux.

Siborne criticizes Grouchy's search effort on 17 June as being unnecessarily restrictive. Grouchy had 65 squadrons of cavalry and sent them mainly toward the French right—where he and Napoleon incorrectly expected the Prussians to be—instead of dispersing them to cover more of the ground east of the Dyle. It would also have allowed him to maintain closer contact with Napoleon by occupying the line of Nil Sait Vincent, Corbaix, Mont-Saint-Guibert, and the bridge at Mousty. It would also have alerted the French to the Prussian rearguard at Mont-Saint-Guibert. While the poor roads may have slowed the progress of Grouchy's main body, Siborne notes that the French cavalry scouts reached Perwez to the east on the evening of 17 June; reaching Mont-Saint-Guibert should not have been a problem.

Siborne also criticizes Grouchy's lack of urgency early on 18 June. From the despatch to Napoleon written at 22:00 on 17 June, Grouchy suspected that a Prussian detachment may have gone to Wavre with the intention of linking up with the Anglo-allied army. He should have known that the distance from Gembloux to Wavre was 15 miles, and only 12 miles from Wavre to Napoleon's line of advance. If Grouchy insisted on advancing on Wavre, he should have moved before 07:00 to 08:00, and not by the circuitous route through Sart-lez-Walhain; matters were made worse by both III and IV Corps using the same road. Siborne suggests a better option was for Grouchy to ignore Wavre and march to Saint-Lambert, where he could support the main French army at Waterloo.

=== What Grouchy might have done ===
In his despatch, written at two o'clock in the morning, he mentioned to Napoleon his design of marching upon Corbaix or Wavre; a movement of which Napoleon, in his reply, expressed his approval; and if he had directed one of his Infantry Corps along the line of Corbaix and La Beiraque, and the other by that of Mont-Saint-Guibert and Mousty, there can be no doubt that, even late as was the hour at which he started from Gembloux, he would, in a great measure, have fulfilled the expectations of Napoleon.

In this case, he would naturally have so divided his cavalry, that one portion would have scoured the country along the front and right of the column marching by Corbaix and La Baraque, (Note: 50.67164°N 4.62184°E Rue De La Baraque, the original feature based on its location against the terrain on the Kaart van Ferraris was probably slightly to the north at 50.67427°N 4.61984°E.) and the other portion would have been employed in a similar manner along the front and Left of the Column moving upon Mont-Saint-Guibert and Mousty. Both at this point and at Ottignies, about 730 metres (800 yd) lower down the stream, there is a stone bridge across the Dyle. There is a direct road from Mousty to Saint-Lambert, scarcely 8 kilometres (5.0 mi), and another to the Field of Waterloo. The cavalry in advance of the left column could not have failed to discover the Prussian troops in march to join the Left of Wellington; for they were then passing slowly, and with extreme difficulty, through the defiles of Saint-Lambert and Lasne.

This discovery would have led to the right column being moved by its left, from La Baraque to Mousty; the cavalry attached to it masking the movement as long as possible. The left column would then, in all probability, have followed its advanced cavalry to Saint-Lambert; and the right corps have either moved upon the same point as a reinforcement, or have diverged upon Lasne as a Support, upon which the former might have fallen back, if compelled to effect its retreat towards Plancenoit.

In this manner might Grouchy have so far realised the anxious expectation of Napoleon as to have fallen upon Bulow flagrante delicto, and have materially procrastinated the co-operation of Blücher with Wellington on 18 June; a co-operation which a contrary proceeding, originating in fatal tardiness of movement, and exhibiting useless manoeuvring in a false direction, could not fail to render easy in execution and successful in result.

But beyond such procrastination of the meditated junction of Blücher's and Wellington's forces. Grouchy could have effected nothing. The junction itself could not have been prevented. The tendency of Grouchy's movements had been too narrowly watched; the country between the Dyle and the Charleroi road to Brussels had been too vigilantly explored; and the movements, in succession, of the different Prussian Corps had been too nicely calculated and determined; to admit of the possibility of a failure, as regarded the arrival of a considerable portion of the Prussian forces on the Left of the Anglo-Allied Army.

=== Blücher's admirable dispositions ===
Blücher had made so admirable a disposition of his four Corps that two of them could at any time have combined, and therefore have presented a superior force to Grouchy, at any point between Wavre and Plancenoit, whilst the remainder of the Army might have continued its march to Waterloo. Had Grouchy moved by Mont-Saint-Guibert and Mousty upon Saint-Lambert, Thielemann's corps would then have been on the march towards Couture-Saint-Germain, according to his original instructions; and finding Bulow engaged with the French, would have joined him. Grouchy might then have contrived to hold both these corps at bay, and thus have reduced the co-operating Prussian force at Waterloo to the two corps under Zieten and Pirch, besides considerably retarding that co-operation; since without having experienced the effects of any such interruption to the progress of the other corps, as we have here supposed, these two generals did not reach the field of battle until seven o'clock in the evening of the 18th.

=== Napoleon's errors at this time ===
No exertions, however, on the part of Grouchy, after he broke up from Gembloux on the morning of 18 June, could have effectually frustrated the junction of Wellington and Blücher. Two great errors, for which that Marshal was not accountable, reduced the contemplated junction from a measure of calculation to one of certainty.

The first and principal of these has already been adverted to at some length, and cannot be too closely kept in view—the fatal neglect of a vigorous pursuit of the defeated Prussians, on the night of 16 June and morning of 17 June by a detached Corps; combined with the extraordinary delay in the attack upon Wellington at Quatre Bras, on the latter day. The second error arose from the want of a strong reconnaissance and vigilant look out on the right of the main French army, on the morning of 18 June, followed up by the occupation of the defiles of the river Lasne.
