= Battle of Wavre =

1815 battle during the War of the Seventh Coalition

- Part of the Waterloo campaign during the War of the Seventh Coalition
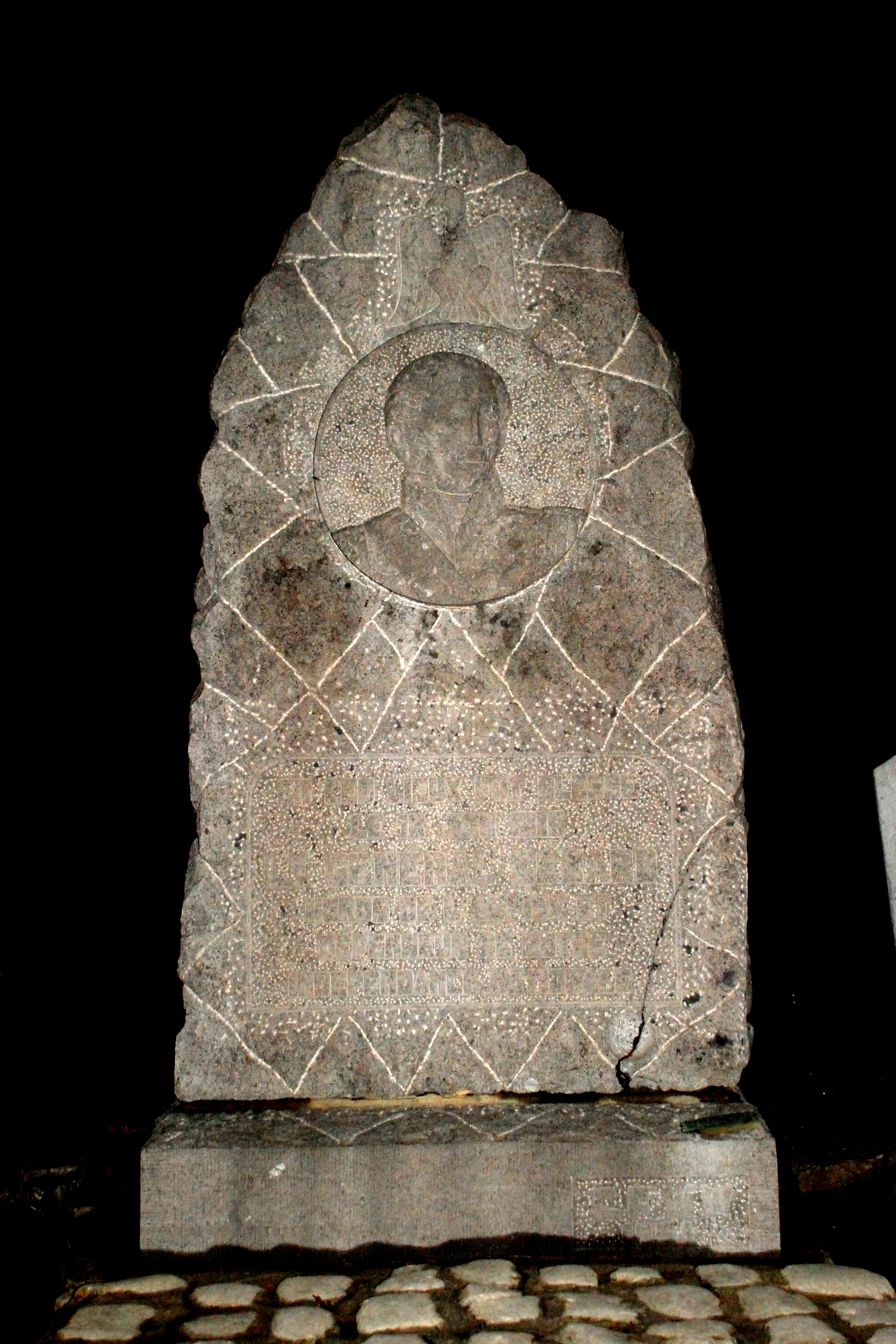
- Monument to General Gérard in Wavre, Belgium
Date	18–19 June 1815
Location	Wavre, Belgium 50°43′N 04°36′E
Result	French victory

Belligerents
(First French Empire) French Empire	(Kingdom of Prussia) Prussia

Commanders and leaders
(First French Empire) Emmanuel de Grouchy (First French Empire) Dominique Vandamme (First French Empire) Étienne Maurice Gérard	(Kingdom of Prussia) Johann von Thielmann

Strength
32,000–33,000; 80 guns	17,000–24,000; 48 guns

Casualties and losses
2,500 killed, wounded or captured	2,500 killed, wounded or captured

Hundred Days:
Waterloo campaign
current battle
Napoleon in command
Napoleon not in command

Map of the Waterloo Campaign

The Battle of Wavre was the final major military action of the Hundred Days campaign and the Napoleonic Wars. It was fought on 18–19 June 1815 between the Prussian rearguard, consisting of the Prussian III Corps under the command of General Johann von Thielmann (whose chief-of-staff was Carl von Clausewitz) and three corps of the French army under the command of Marshal Grouchy. A blocking action, this battle kept 33,000 French soldiers from reaching the Battle of Waterloo and so helped in the defeat of Napoleon at Waterloo.

== Background ==
Following defeat at the Battle of Ligny two days earlier, the Prussian army retreated north in good order and formed up at Wavre. Wellington's Anglo-allied army won a tactical victory at Quatre Bras, but had been unable to come to the aid of the Prussians at Ligny and retreated northwards, to a defensive position at Waterloo. Napoleon moved the bulk of his army off in pursuit of Wellington, and sent Grouchy in pursuit of the retreating Prussians with the right wing (aile droite) of the Army of the North (L'Armée du Nord), a force consisting of 33,000 men and 80 guns.

The French units in the order of battle were: (Note: The figures given for unit strengths in the order of battle are not accurate for the battle of Wavre and are, in fact, impossibly precise for any such military action given the inevitable effects of any battlefield's confusion and the "fog of war." Both forces had been engaged and suffered casualties at the battle of Ligny, and some 8,000 men of the Prussian army had become stragglers during the retreat from Ligny. There would also be a number of men not at the battle for other reasons, although as the campaign had only just started, there would have been little of the usual attrition due to sickness so common to field armies during the Napoleonic wars.)

- III Corps (General Dominique Vandamme)
  - 17,099 infantry – 38 guns
- IV Corps (General Étienne Maurice Gérard)
  - 15,013 infantry – 38 guns
- II Cavalry Corps (General Remy Exelmans)
  - 3,392 infantry – 12 guns
- IV (Hussars) Cavalry Division (General Pierre Soult)
  - 1,485 infantry – 8 guns detached from the I Cavalry Corps
  - 5,000 cavalry from the Reserve Army

Grouchy was slow in taking up the pursuit after Ligny, which allowed Prince Blücher to fall back largely unmolested to Wavre, regroup his army, and then execute a flank march with three of his four corps to join up with Wellington's Anglo-allied army at Waterloo. The remaining corps, the III Prussian Corps (Thielmann's) of 17,000 men and 48 guns, was to follow the other three corps leaving a small rearguard in Wavre, unless the French appeared in force in which case he was to oppose any French attempt to close on the main body of the Prussian army.

== Prelude ==
=== French positions ===
Marshal Grouchy was in Gembloux with III Corps commanded by General Vandamme and IV Corps commanded by General Gerard. The 4th Cavalry Division, commanded by Pajol, and the 21st infantry division, under Teste (from Lobau's corps), formed the remainder of his force. Reconnaissance by Pajol's horsemen during the 17th of June found that the Prussians had left Namur.

=== French movements ===
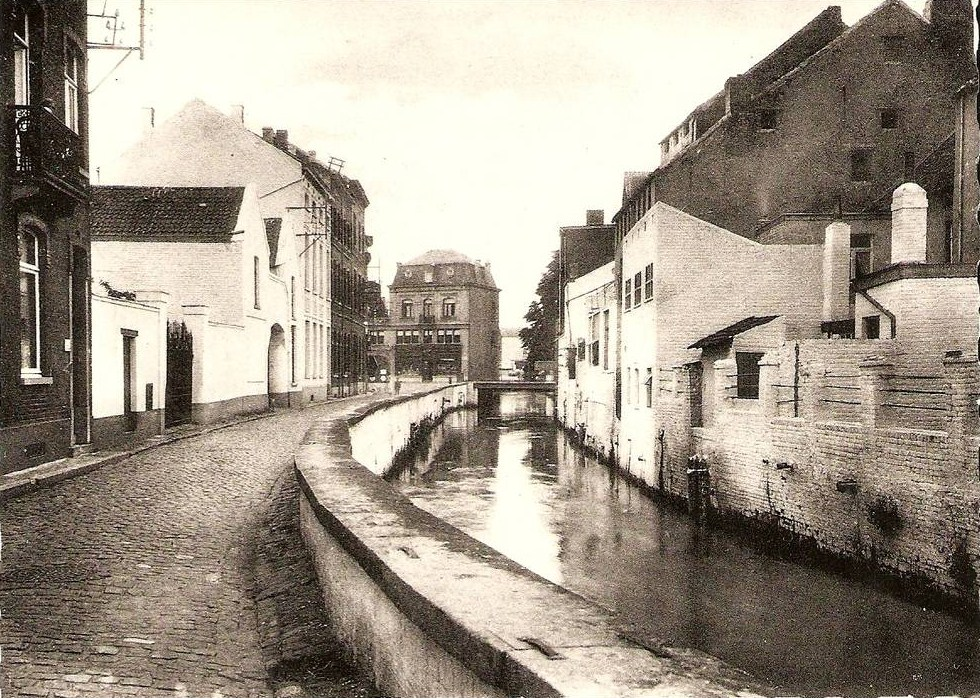
The Dyle river in Wavre (early 20th century).

At around 06:00 of 18 June 1815 Grouchy reported to Napoleon that the Prussians had left Tourinnes by marching all night. He further reported that he was moving on Wavre with all haste. At 10:00 Grouchy reported to Napoleon that the Prussian I, II, and—mistakenly—III Corps (Note: In fact the Prussian force that marched to Waterloo comprised I, II, and IV Corps. Thielmann's III Corps was the force opposing Grouchy at Wavre.) were marching in the direction of Brussels, and that Prussian officers were talking of joining Wellington to offer battle to the French army. His despatch included a Prussian requisition form by way of proof. He suggested that by attacking and standing at Wavre, he could block the Prussians from intervening against the rest of the French army. At 11:30, Grouchy and his corps commanders heard in the distance the noise from the Grand Battery as the Battle of Waterloo started. Grouchy's corps commanders, especially Gérard, suggested that they should "march to the sound of the guns." Grouchy, however, had written and verbal orders from Napoleon to march on Wavre and to engage the Prussians there, and knew that Marshal Ney had been taken to task by Napoleon two days earlier for not following orders at the Battle of Quatre Bras. Grouchy therefore declined to follow his subordinates' suggestion, pointing out that Napoleon had more than enough force to deal with Wellington. Minutes after this conversation, Exelmans reported strong Prussian positions 5 km (3.1 mi) at Wavre. At 13:00, elements of Exelmans' cavalry were in contact with the Prussian 14th Brigade’s rear guard. Further argument was ended by the arrival at 16:00 of another order from Napoleon, repeating the instruction to Grouchy to attack the Prussians before him.

=== Prussian movements ===
Blücher had ordered Thielmann to defend the position of Wavre in the event of Marshal Grouchy advancing in force, or, if otherwise, to follow the main Prussian army in the direction of Couture-Saint-Germain and the battlefield of Waterloo. Thielmann was on the point of leaving Wavre to march towards Couture-Saint-Germain when the French III Corps (Vandamme's) arrived in front of his position, at about 16:00, and the French artillery immediately opened a cannonade upon the Prussians.

All the brigades (the 9th, 10th, 11th, and 12th) of the Prussian III Corps (Thielmann's), had, at that time, received the order to commence the general movement to the right (west). A detachment of only two battalions (the Fusilier battalions of the 30th Regiment and of the 1st Kurmark Landwehr), under Colonel Zepelin, from the 9th Brigade, which had not yet crossed the river Dyle, was to be left in occupation of Wavre. The 12th Brigade was already in full line of march, and the 11th had just been put in motion.

When General Borcke, who commanded the 9th Brigade, fell back upon Wavre for the purpose of carrying out his instructions, he found the bridge already barricaded, and therefore proceeded with his brigade to Basse-Wavre (a short distance east and down-stream of Wavre). Having crossed the Dyle at this point, he left a detachment there, consisting of the sharpshooters of the Fusilier Battalion of the 8th Regiment and those of the 1st Battalion of the 30th Regiment, under Major Ditfurth, whom he directed to destroy the bridge immediately. He then detached the 2nd Battalion of the 30th Regiment and his two squadrons of the Kurmark Landwehr Cavalry, as a reinforcement to Zepelin at Wavre. With the remainder of his brigade, he then continued his march.

In the meantime, French Tirailleurs were observed extending along the opposite heights, and in their rear considerable masses of French troops appeared to be advancing. It soon became manifest to the Prussians that the French contemplated forcing a passage of the river.

=== Prussian preparations and dispositions ===
Thielmann, judging by the want of vigour displayed in the French pursuit and by the French not having attempted to secure the passage of the Dyle at Mousty, (Note: 50.66077°N 4.56664°E Mousty is called "Moustier" by Siborne.) Limelette, and Limal, considered that it was only a weak detachment that was advancing upon Wavre, confining itself to the design of creating some little uneasiness by its movement along this road to Brussels. He had hitherto been of the opinion that the occupation of Wavre by a few battalions, as directed by Blücher, would be quite sufficient, but he now plainly saw that a moment had arrived which required him, in pursuance of his instructions, to maintain the position at Wavre. Accordingly, he ordered the halt of his whole corps for this purpose.

The town of Wavre is situated on the left (north) bank of the Dyle, having a suburb on the opposite side of the river, with which it was then connected by two stone bridges. The principal of these bridges led towards the middle, and the smaller one towards the upper end of the town. Higher up the stream, at the Mill of Bierges, (Note: 50.69680°N 4.58566°E: The Mill of Bierges was located at what is now "Rue du Moulin à Eau 11, 1300 Wavre, Belgium" (south-west of Wavre town centre)) at Limal, and at Limelette. Below the town at Basse-Wavre, there were wooden bridges. The river Dyle is not deep, but because of the very heavy rain over the previous 24 hours it was swollen.

The low range of heights on either side of the valley was covered in many places with woods. The heights on the right bank are generally more elevated, but those on the left have steeper declivities, and offer a greater command of the river and its passages. The shortest road from Namur to Brussels passed through the town, besides which there were numerous crossroads practicable for the movement of all arms. The great number of hollow ways forms a prominent feature in the vicinity, and these, being in a miry state from the rain, were unfavourable to the progress of troops passing through them.

The position was thus occupied:

- the 12th Brigade (Colonel Stülpnagel), with the Horse Battery No. 20, was posted on the height in rear of Bierge. The bridge in front of this village was barricaded, and the Mill occupied for the defence of the bridge.
- The 10th Brigade (Colonel Kämpfen) stood upon the heights in the rear of Wavre, its right resting on a wood which lay between it and the 12th Brigade.
- The 11th Brigade (Colonel Luce) was formed across the Brussels road.
- The reserve cavalry was drawn up, near La Bawette, (Note: 50.72943°N 4.59624°E (2 kilometres (1.2 mi) north of Wavre). Siborne and Kaart van Ferraris calls it "La Bavette.") in columns of squadrons.
- The artillery was distributed along the heights. Horse Battery No. 18 remained in reserve.

That suburb of the town of Wavre which lies on the right (i.e., the south) bank was occupied by light troops only. The great bridge was barricaded as well as time and circumstances would admit. The houses adjoining the left bank of the river were hastily loopholed. The smaller bridge was left perfectly open. A detachment of two companies of light infantry, under Major Bornstadt was detached to reinforce the troops at the bridge at Basse-Wavre.

Thielmann intended that the 9th Brigade should be posted in rear of this general disposition of his troops, so that its services might be made available according as circumstances might require; but through some misunderstanding in the transmission of the order, General Borcke was induced, after having moved along the Brussels road until near La Bawette, thence to turn off to his left, and continue his march, according to his original instructions in the direction of Froidmont, (Note: 50.69649°N 4.52913°E Froidmont was a hamlet south of Rixensart about 1/3 of the way to Profondsart.) Bourgeois, and Saint-Lambert, towards Couture-Saint-Germain; being under the impression that the whole corps had already commenced this march, in pursuance of the general plan, and that his brigade was destined to cover the movement.

The departure of the Brigade was not immediately discovered. Through this misunderstanding, Thielmann's force suffered an unexpected reduction of six battalions and Foot Battery No. 18; and consisted, therefore, of only 15,200 men, with which number he had now to contend against Marshal Grouchy's force, amounting altogether to 33,765 men.

In the opinion of William Siborne a contemporary British historian, Thielmann's position was certainly a very favourable one, and the occupation of it was arranged with great skill. It was impossible to foresee in what manner the attack upon it would be conducted—whether it would be directed against one particular bridge, or against all the bridges, with the design of carrying the whole Line by storm. Thielmann therefore limited the occupation of the town and of the line of the river to the number of light troops that might be sufficient for sustaining any sudden assault, taking care to have support close at hand for that purpose. However, he placed his reserves, which comprised his main force, so that they might become available at any point which might be pressed. Should the French develop greatly superior numbers, as was subsequently the case, that would serve to guard against any flank attack.

== Battle ==
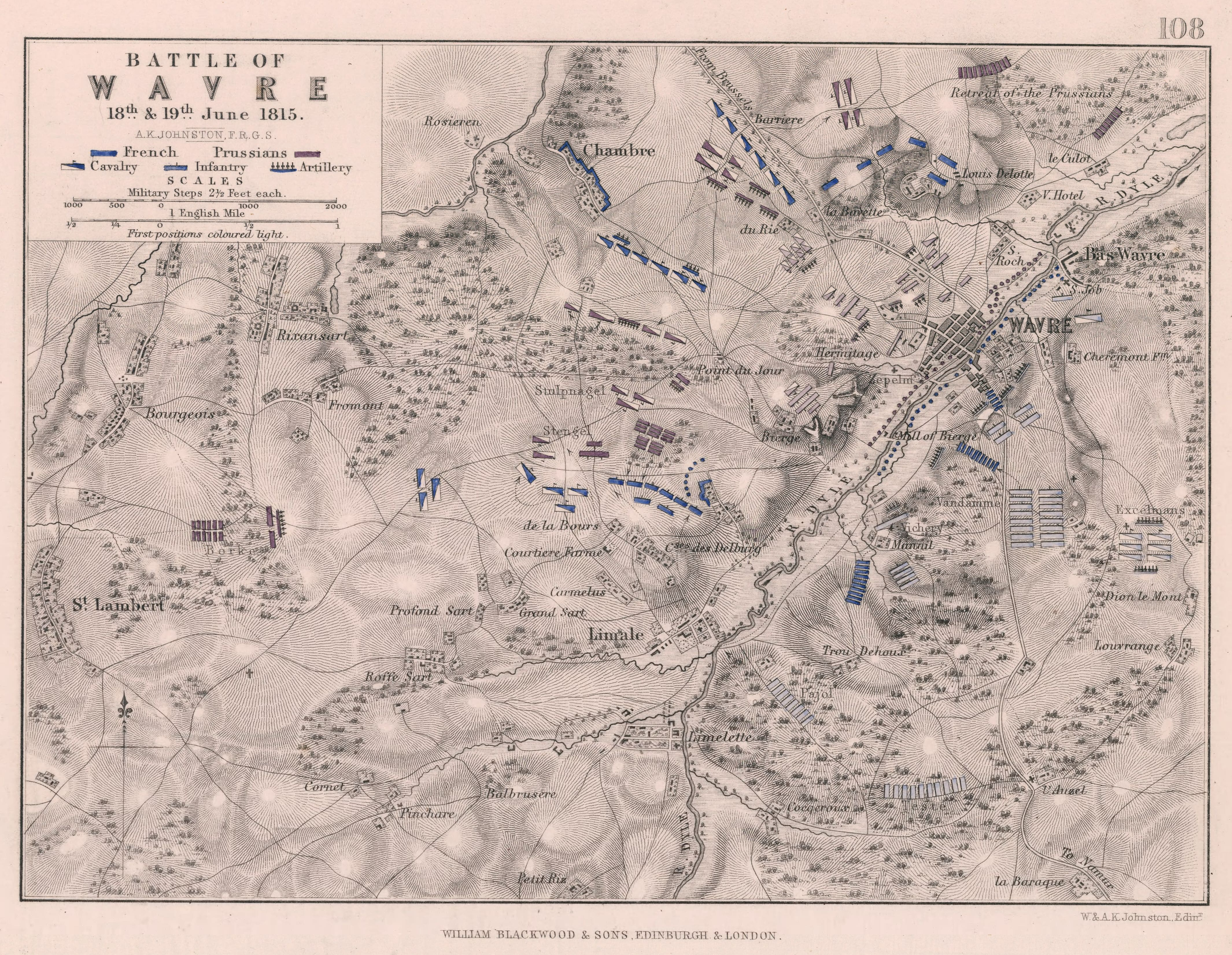
Detailed map of the Battle of Wavre, 18 & 19 June 1815 (Atlas to Alison's history of Europe)

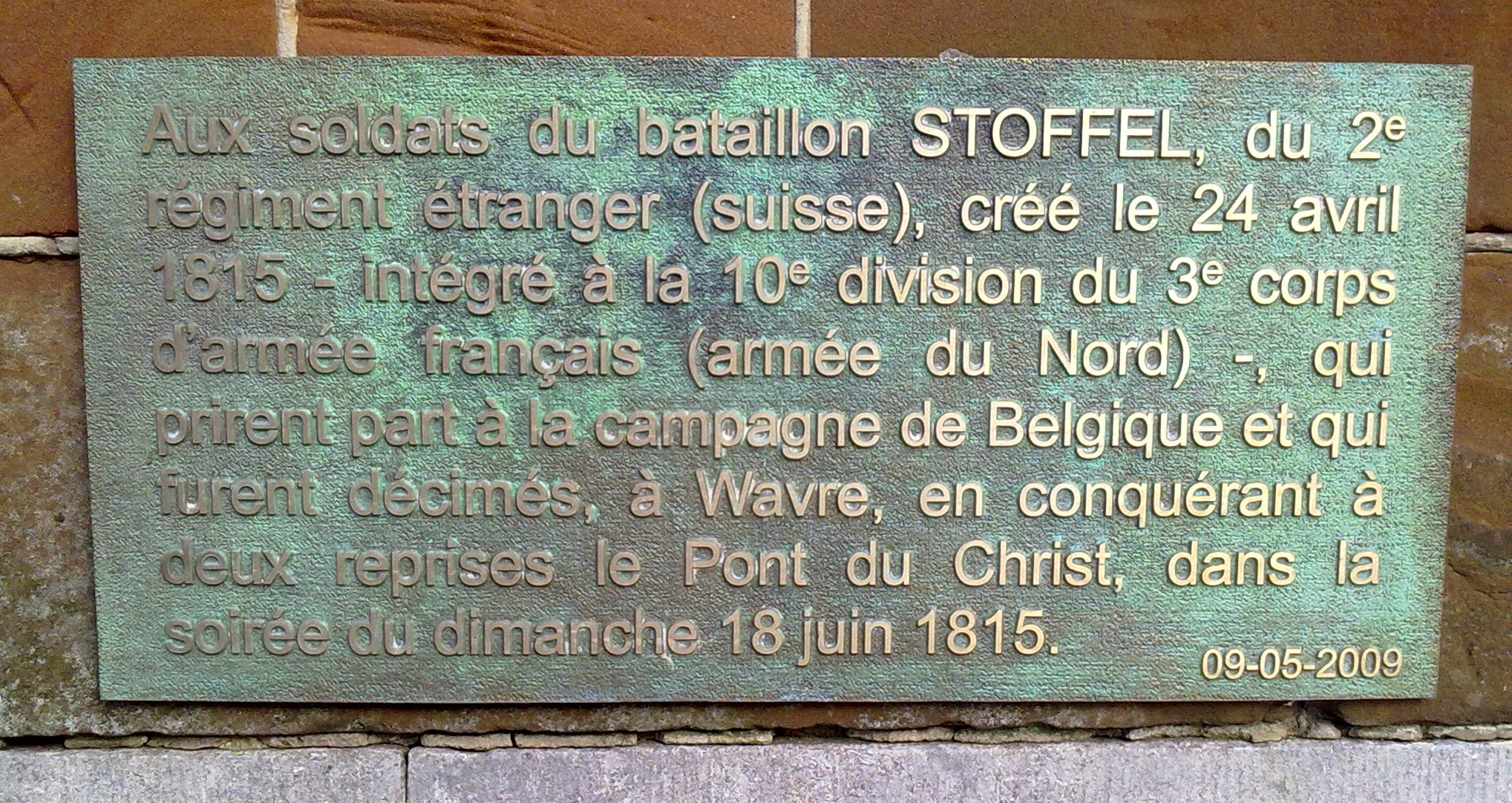
Commemorative plaque to the 1815 battle, Dyle bridge, Wavre. (Note: The wording on the plaque translates as: "To the soldiers of the STOFFEL battalion, of the 2nd Foreign Regiment (Swiss) created on 24 April 1815 - integrated into the 10th Division of the 3rd Corps of the French Army (Army of the North) - who took part in the Belgian campaign and who were decimated, at Wavre, while twice conquering the Christ Bridge, on the evening of Sunday, 18 June 1815.")

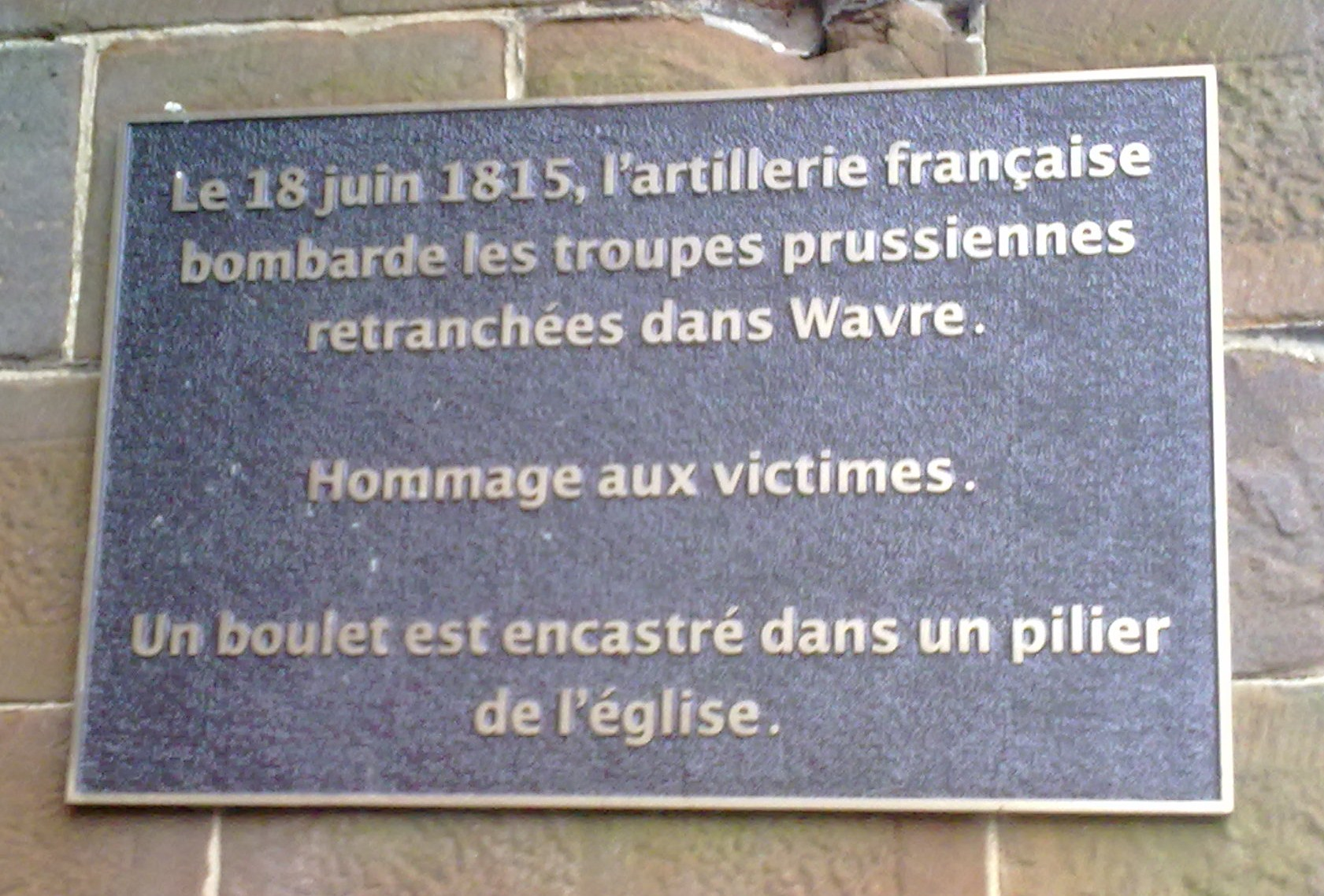
Plaque at the St. John-the-Baptist church, Wavre (Note: The wording on the plaque translates as: "On 18 June 1815, the French Artillery bombarded the Prussian troops retrenched in Wavre. Homage to the victims. A cannonball is (still) embedded into one of the church pillars".)

Late in the afternoon of 18 June, as Napoleon was heavily engaged against Wellington at Waterloo, Grouchy, commanding the corps of General Gérard and General Vandamme, prepared to attack the Prussian forces confronting him over the River Dyle between the towns of Wavre and Limal.

General Vandamme opened the Battle of Wavre at 16:00, unlimbering 3 batteries, then moved Habert's division in an attempt to take the bridges by quick assault. Marshal Grouchy, having just received Marshal Soult's order to move against Wavre, ordered Exelmans' cavalry with an infantry battalion against the bridge at Bas-Wavre while Lefol's division moved against the bridge at Bierges. The fusilier battalion of the 1st Kurmark Landwehr Regiment defended the Bierge bridge by removing timbers from it under French fire and counter-charging any attempt to repair it. The Kurmarkers held the right bank of the stone bridge at Wavre for some time, forcing Vandamme's troops to waste precious time taking it. Once this was done the French rushed across the bridge and straight into a vicious street fight. A battalion of the 2nd Kurmark Landwehr Regiment moved to support the 1st and threw the French back across the bridge. A renewed French assault penetrated further down the same street, only to be ambushed from side streets by the fusiliers of the 1st Kurmark Landwehr and 30th Line Infantry Regiments using point blank musketry. A bayonet charge sent the French scrambling across the bridge again. This see-saw battle would continue throughout the night. Later attacks by the French upon Wavre met with no more success. The Prussians assigned another battalion and three guns to the bridge. The bridge at Bas-Wavre had been destroyed by the Prussians. The attacks by Lefol upon the bridge of Bierges had no more success, being hampered by muddy ground and the tough defense of the Prussian 31st Line Infantry Regiment supported by the 2nd battalion of the 6th Kurmark Landwehr Regiment and a horse battery. Three small battalions and three squadrons of cavalry under Stengel were to guard a bridge to the west at Limal.

Marshal Soult's 13:00 letter ordering Grouchy to move quickly to join Napoleon and to attack Bülow arrived after 18:00. Grouchy at once began gathering additional divisions and headed to Limal, arriving at 23:00, where he found that Pajol's cavalry had forced the bridge there. Prussian scouting cavalry noticed the strong French columns moving to Limal and the Prussian 12th Brigade moved covering forces to the area. The Prussians made a bayonet charge in an attempt to retake Limal, but without success. Night closed the major actions of the battle of Wavre, although outposts fired on each other all night.

At approximately 20:00 the French attack at Waterloo was irrevocably lost as its left, center, and right collapsed within a few minutes of each other. Grouchy was by then across the Dyle, but meanwhile the remnants of the Armėe du Nord were streaming south towards the imagined safety of French territory.

Fighting renewed in the early hours. The forest south of Limal was forced by 09:00. Thielmann then elected to retreat as the campaign had been decided by the fighting elsewhere. The definitive report of the victory at Waterloo reached Thielmann at 10:00 as his retreat started.

Grouchy, watching the Prussian retreat, was beginning his planned move upon Brussels when the news reached him at 10:30 that Napoleon had been defeated. Though in shock, Grouchy realised he was in danger of being trapped and his entire command destroyed. He at once had Exelmans move his cavalry to secure the bridges and began a retreat by forced marches that would take him back to Paris. The victorious French forces had held the battlefield for only 30 minutes.

== Conclusion ==
While the battle ended in a French tactical victory, with the Prussians in retreat and Grouchy firmly athwart Prussian lines of communication to the east, this victory proved hollow as Napoléon was defeated at Waterloo. The Prussians had held their ground long enough to allow Blücher's transfer of 50,000 troops to Wellington's aid at Waterloo. In addition, the Prussian rearguard of 17,000 troops had tied down 33,000 French troops that could have otherwise taken part at Waterloo. Thus, for the Prussians, the battle was a strategic success, as it contributed to the decisive victory at Waterloo.

== See also ==
- Order of Battle of the Waterloo Campaign
- List of Napoleonic battles

== Notes ==
Preceded by Battle of Waterloo	Napoleonic Wars; Battle of Wavre	Succeeded by Battle of Rocheserviere
