= Beaucarne =

Beaucarne is a surname. Notable people with the surname include:

- Christophe Beaucarne (born 1965), Belgian cinematographer
- Julos Beaucarne (1936–2021), Belgian artist
