= Alexandre César Louis, Comte d'Estourmel =

French soldier

- Born: March 29, 1780
- Died: March 27, 1852 (aged 71)
- Military career
- Allegiance: France
- Branch: French Army

Alexandre César Louis, Comte d'Estourmel (1780–1852) was a French soldier during the Napoleonic Wars and a member of the Chamber of Deputies from 1815 until 1837.

== Biography ==
Estourmel was born in Paris on 29 March 1780. He entered the army in 1799 and served in Germany, Spain, and Portugal. After the battle of Eckmühl, in which he took part, he received the Legion of Honour from Napoleon. During the Waterloo Campaign of 1815 he served as aide-de-camp to General Excelmans commander of the French II Cavalry Corps and was present at the battles of Ligny and Wavre.

In 1815 d'Estourmel was elected to the chamber of deputies, where he sat, with only short intervals of absence, until 1837. He always voted with the ultra-liberal party in the chamber. In 1833 he was sent to America on a mission of importance, He was one of the 29 deputies who gave the influence of their names to the insurgents who dethroned Charles X. In 1833 he was sent on an important mission to the United States, but was recalled at the moment of his entering Washington. He died 27 April 1852 in Suzanne, Somme.

Member of the chamber of deputies:

- Nord - Minorité modérée (22 August 1815 – 5 September)
- Nord - Minorité libérale (28 January 1822 – 24 December 1813)
- Nord - Minorité libérale (23 June 1830 – 31 May 1831)
- Nord - Majorité ministérielle (5 July 1831 – 25 August 1834)
- Nord - Majorité ministérielle (21 June 1834 – 3 October 1837)
