= Limal =

Sub-municipality of the city of Wavre, Wallonia, Belgium

Limal Nîmal (Walloon)
- Sub-municipality of Wavre
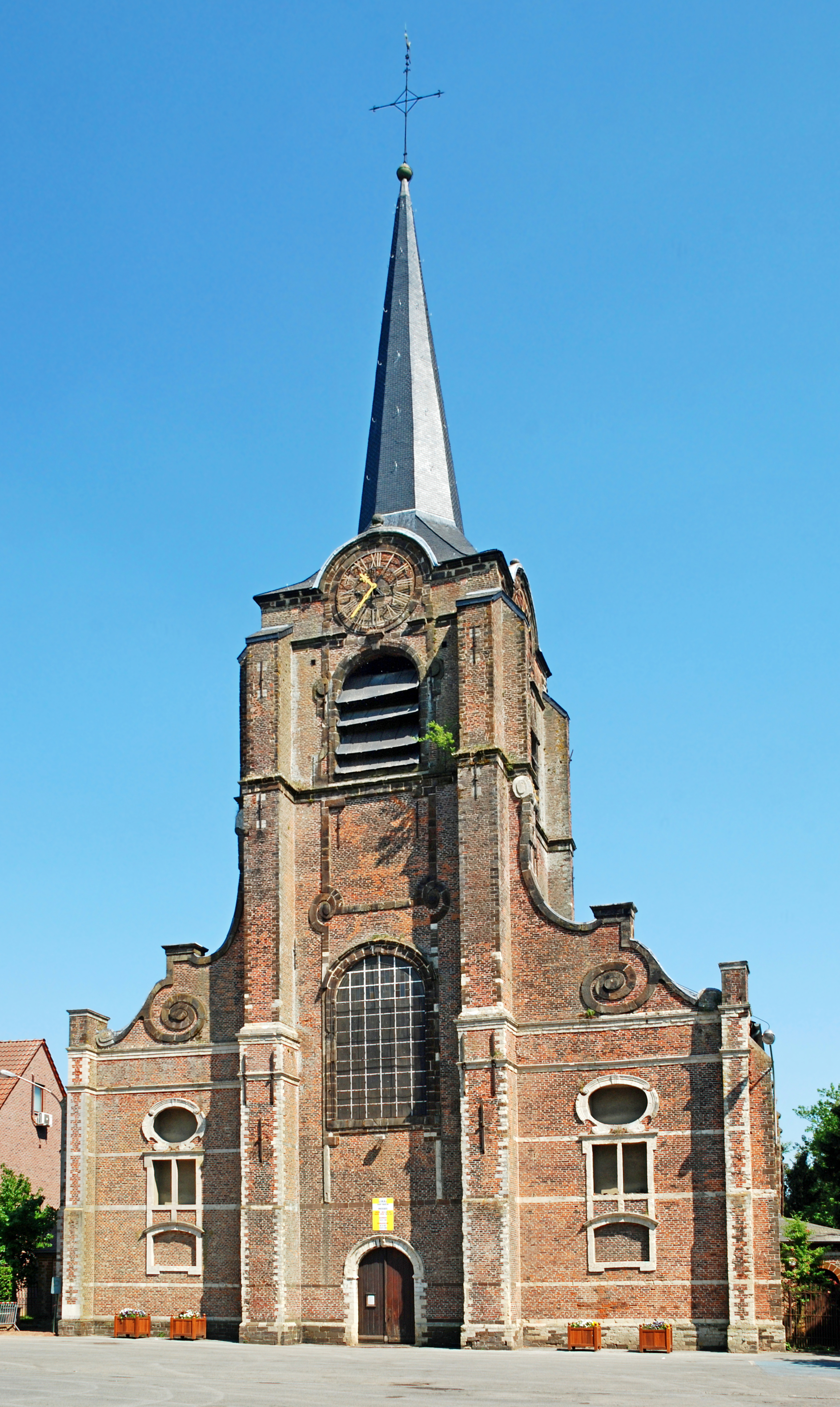
- St Martin's Church
- Interactive map of Limal
- Location within Belgium Location within Walloon Brabant
- Coordinates: 50°41′37″N 4°34′27″E
- Country: Belgium
- Community: French Community
- Region: Wallonia
- Province: Walloon Brabant
- Arrondissement: Nivelles
- Municipality: Wavre

Area
  - Total: 11.29 km^{2} (4.36 sq mi)

Population (2020-01-01)
  - Total: 9,440
  - Density: 836/km^{2} (2,170/sq mi)
- Postal codes: 1300
- Area codes: 010

Limal (Note: Limal is spelt Limale in early 19th century English language accounts of the Battle of Wavre (1815).) (French pronunciation: [limal]; Walloon: Nîmal) is a sub-municipality of the city of Wavre located in the province of Walloon Brabant, Wallonia, Belgium. It was a separate municipality until 1977. On 1 January 1977, it was merged into Wavre.
