= Tourinnes-la-Grosse =

Village in Brabant, Wallonia

Coordinates: 50°47′N 4°45′E

Tourinnes-la-Grosse (El Grosse) Tourene (Walloon)
- Village
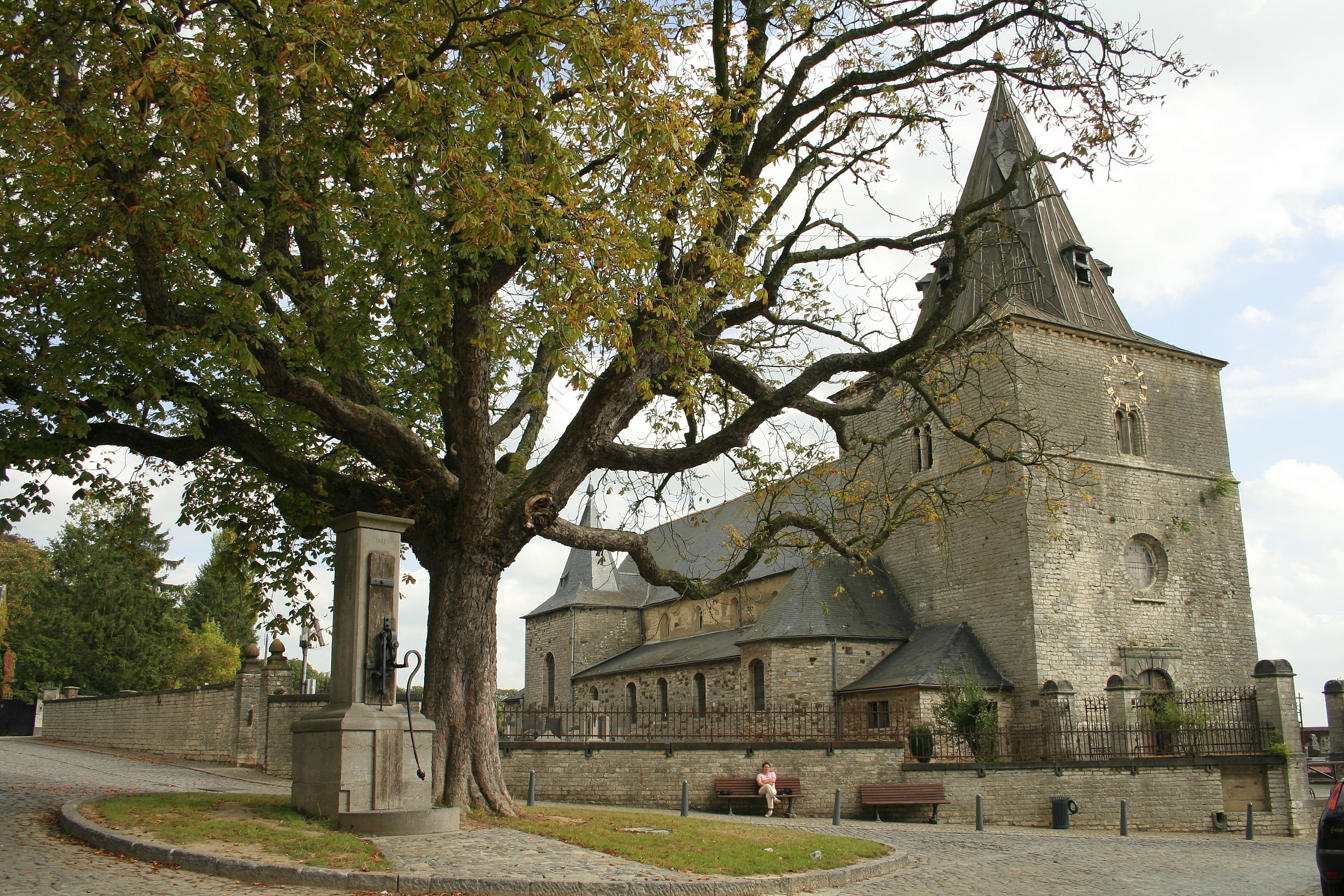
- The church of St Martin in Tourinnes-la-Grosse

- Location within Walloon Brabant
- Country: Belgium
- Region: Wallonia
- Province: Walloon Brabant
- Municipality: Beauvechain

Tourinnes-la-Grosse (French pronunciation: [tuʁin la ɡʁos]; Dutch: Deurne, pronounced [ˈdøːrnə]; Walloon: (El Grosse) Tourene) is a village of Wallonia and a district of the municipality of Beauvechain, located in the province of Walloon Brabant, Belgium. It was a municipality in its own right before the fusion of the Belgian municipalities in 1977.

== Heritage ==
The village has one of the oldest churches of Walloon Brabant, which dominates the whole valley. Indeed, the Saint-Martin church is an outstanding example of a rural medieval sanctuary preserved in the purity of its forms and its original proportions. The oldest part, the central nave, goes back to the Carolingian dynasty (10th century). The thickness of its walls varies from 1.6m to 1.8m. The square pillars without capitals, the horseshoe arches and the wide and low nave present the building as an early Christian basilica. There is also a 17th-century baroque pulpit, a baptismal font of blue stone from the same time, Style Louis XIV confessionals, as well as a wrought iron communion bench Louis XV. The church is located close to the municipal school of Tourinnes-la-Grosse. The name Tourinnes-la-Grosse is explained by the existence of its "big tower", lower and wider than most of the church towers.

Since 1946, this church has been registered as a monument; in 2002 it was listed among the exceptional built heritage of Wallonia.

In 1938, a calvary was erected next to the presbytery.

== Notable inhabitants ==
- Jérôme Colin
- Julos Beaucarne, a Belgian artist (storyteller, poet, actor, writer, singer), singing in French and Walloon, lives there.

== Meteorite fall ==
On the 7 December 1863, at 11.30 a.m., a 14.5 kilogram meteorite (a hypersthene and type L6 bronzite chondrite) fell towards the Rond Chêne. The sound of the explosion was heard from far away and many chunks were collected. In Paris, the Natural History Museum has a big fragment of 1.2 kg. The Royal Belgian Institute of Natural Sciences holds a small piece. The University of California in Los Angeles has a chunk of 10.7 grammes. With the meteorite of Saint-Denis-Wetrem of 7 June 1855 and that of Lesve of 13 April 1896, it is one of three approved meteorite falls observed in Belgium.

== Bibliography ==
- Th. Bertrand, F. Doperé, V. Léonard, D. Maloens and G. Piron, L’église Saint-Martin de Tourinnes-la-Grosse. Restaurations et conservation (1930-2010), Beauvechain, Nauwelaerts Editions Historiques, 2010.
- J. Tarlier and A. Wauters, Géographie et histoire des communes belges. Province de Brabant, cantons de Jodoigne et Tirlemont, Brussels, A. Decq, 1872, pp. 176–189.
- "Tourinnes-la-Grosse", in Beauvechain, Incourt et Jodoigne. Patrimoine architectural et territoires de Wallonie, Sprimont, Mardaga - Ministère de la Région wallonne-DGTALP, 2006, pp. 75–85.
