= Mellery =

Section of Villers-la-Ville, Wallonia, Belgium

Coordinates: 50°34′N 4°34′E

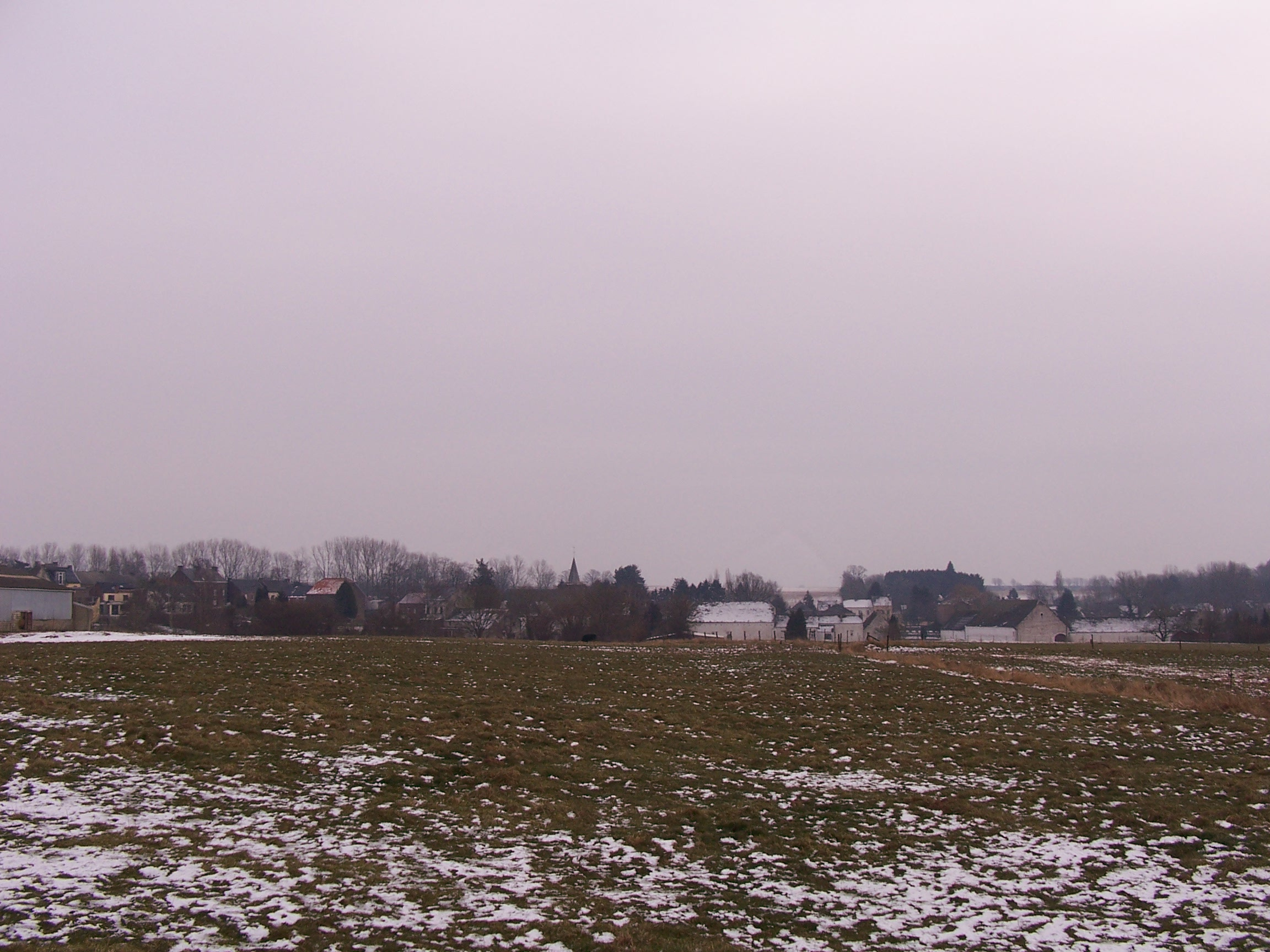
View of Mellery

Mellery (French pronunciation: [mɛlʁi]; Walloon: Mélénri) is a village of Wallonia and a district of the municipality of Villers-la-Ville, located in the province of Walloon Brabant, Belgium.
