= Maransart =

Belgian Town

Coordinates: 50°29′N 4°27′E

Maransart (French pronunciation: [maʁɑ̃saʁ]; Walloon: Maransåt) is a Belgian town and district of the municipality of Lasne, Wallonia in the province of Walloon Brabant. The holotype of the extinct crocodilian Dollosuchoides was discovered here in 1915 and the Middle Eocene Brussels Formation, where Dollosuchoides was recovered from, is known to outcrop near Maransart.

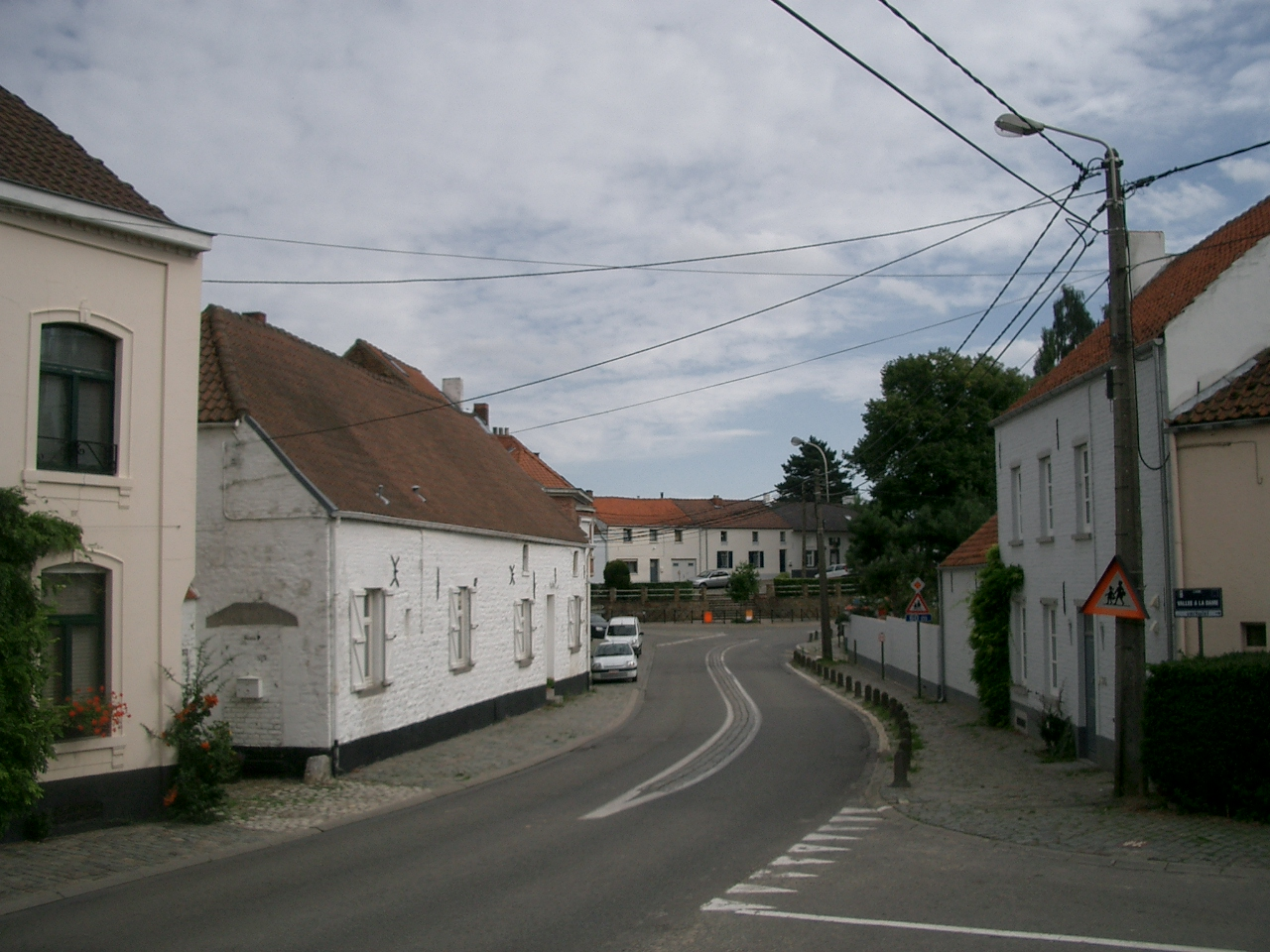
Maransart

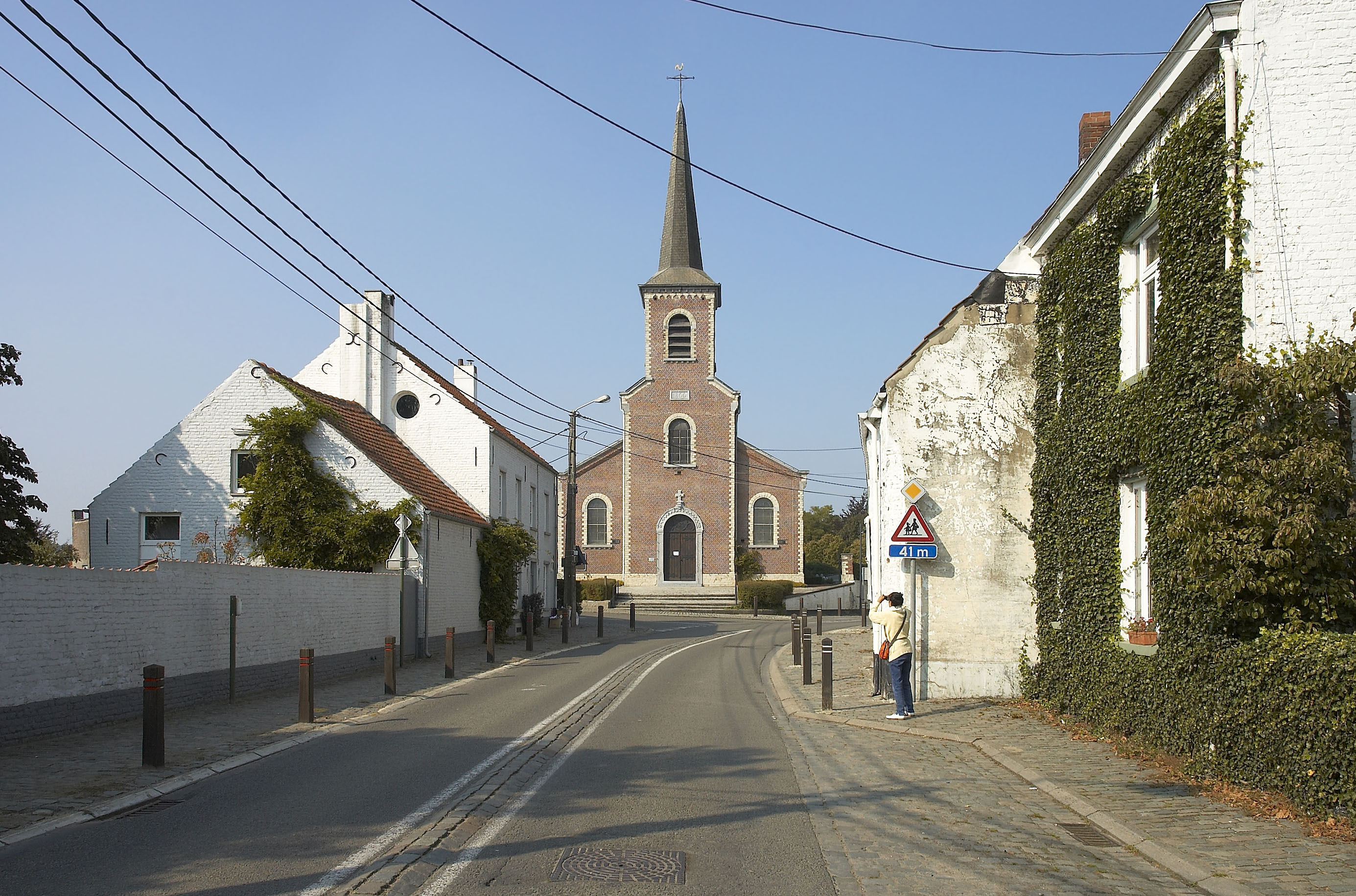
Maransart Church
