= Julos Beaucarne =

Belgian artist (1936–2021)

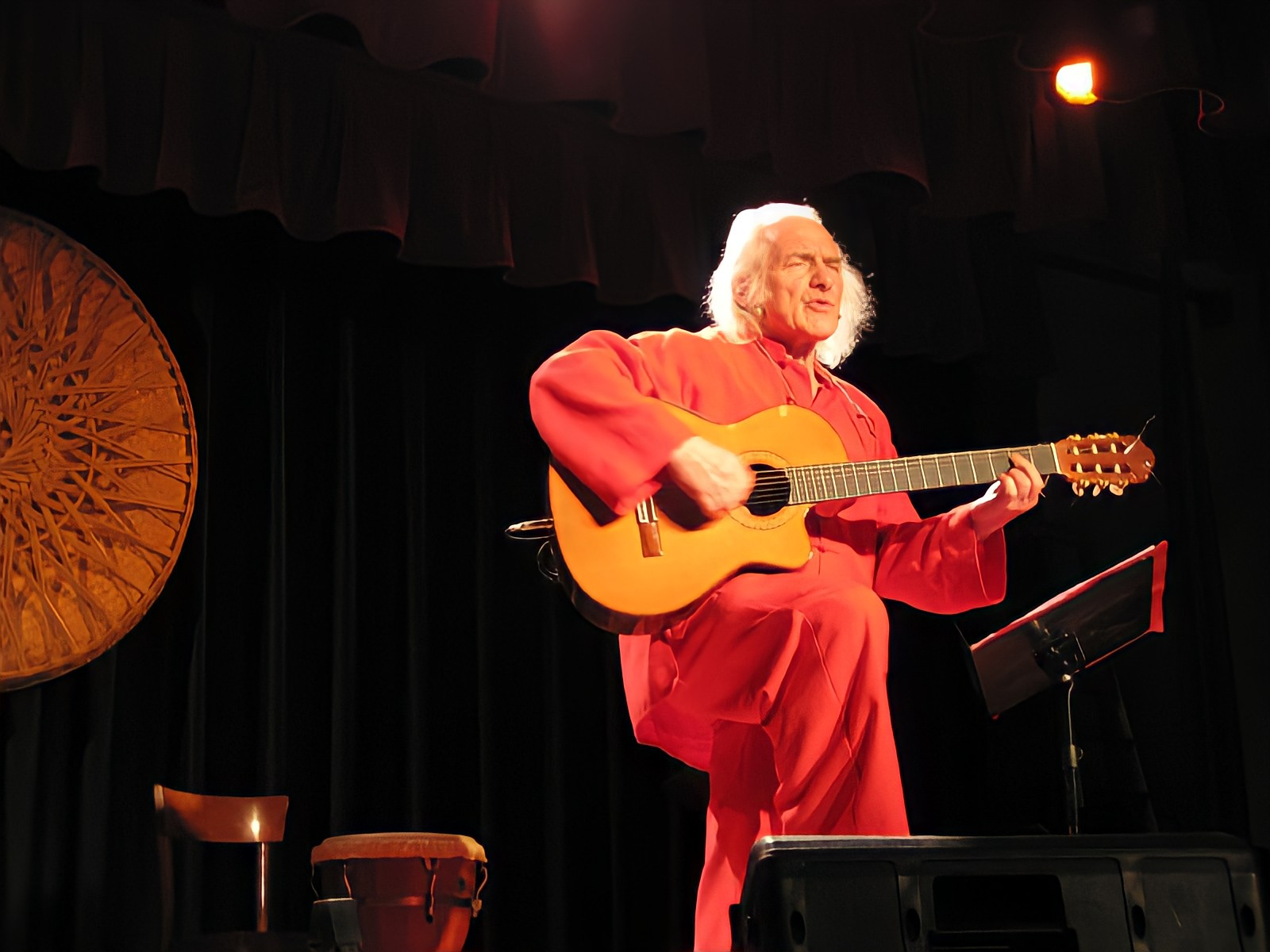
Julos Beaucarne, belgian singer, in concert, march 2007.

Julos Beaucarne, (27 June 1936 – 18 September 2021) was a Belgian artist (storyteller, poet, actor, writer, singer, sculptor), singing in French and Walloon. He lived in Tourinnes-la-Grosse, in Walloon Brabant (Belgium). One of his acting roles was the "father Jacques" in The Mystery of the Yellow Room and Le Parfum de la dame en noir Beaucarne's first single was recorded in 1964. He produced multiple albums since then.

== Biography ==
In 1964, he recorded his first single, and its first LP Julos chante Julos came out in 1967. Since then, he produced about one album every two years. These include L'enfant qui veut vider la mer (1968), Julos chante pour vous (1969), Chandeleur 75 (1975), Les communiqués colombophiles (1976), Julos au Théâtre de la ville (1977), La p'tite gayole (1981), Chansons d'amour (2002), a double album with Barbara Alcantara given to the farm of Wahenge, site of the post-industrial pagodas near the village where he lived, and two CDs where he sings poems he set to music. These albums range from song collages, recited poems, humorous monologues, to "catch-up sounds and voice clips". Each album is thus an atmosphere more than a concept, which reflects a state of mind mixing revolt (lettre à Kissinger, Bosnia and Herzegovina), tenderness (Y Vaut Meyeu S'bêtchi), humor (Pompes funèbres) and everyday life, as his neighbor's voice in the "communiqués colombophiles" (pigeon releases). He refused stardom, had his own publishing house, records, and books (Publishing Louise-Hélène France). He continued to live in his village of Tourinnes-la-Grosse in Wallonia and talked by himself on the forum of his website.

The murder of his wife Loulou (Louise-Hélène France) at Candlemas in 1975, changed his style to a more humanist one. That night he wrote an open letter analyzing the guilt of the society that put the weapon in the hands of assassins, along with a call to "reforest the human soul" with "love, friendship, and persuasion". After this tragedy, he traveled, particularly in Quebec and he strengthened his ties with French speakers' singers culture. At the death of King Baudouin, he was chosen as a symbol of the Belgian people to sing a tribute to the late king. He was knighted in July 2002 by King Albert II. He also signed the Manifesto for Walloon culture in 1983.

He put poems of Belgian authors (especially Max Elskamp) or non-Belgian into songs like "Je ne songeais pas à Rose" (Victor Hugo), "Je fais souvent ce rêve étrange" (Paul Verlaine), and "Jeune fille plus belle que toutes nos légendes" (Gaston Miron).

He played the "Father Jacques" in The Mystery of the Yellow Room and Le Parfum de la dame en noir.

In 2012, he played the role of father of Prudence in Associés contre le crime, Pascal Thomas, Catherine Frot, and Dussollier.

== Discography ==
=== Studio albums ===
- 1967: Julos chante Julos
- 1968: L'enfant qui veut vider la mer
- 1969: Julos chante pour vous
- 1971: Premières chansons
- 1972: Arrêt facultatif
- 1974: Front de libération des arbres fruitiers
- 1975: Chandeleur 75
- 1976: Les Communiqués colombophiles
- 1976: Julos chante pour les petits et les grands
- 1978: Mon terroir c'est les galaxies
- 1979: Le Vélo volant
- 1980: Le Chanteur du silence
- 1981: La P'tite Gayole
- 1981: L'Univers musical (1) (instrumental album)
- 1982: L'Hélioplane
- 1984: L'avenir a changé de berceau
- 1986: L'Ère vidéo-chrétienne
- 1986: Contes, comptines et ballades
- 1989: L'univers musical (2) (instrumental album)
- 1990: 9/9/99, monde neuf
- 1993: Tours, temples et pagodes post-industriels
- 1997: Vingt ans depuis quarante ans
- 2000: Co n' rawète
- 2006: Le Jaseur Boréal
- 2012: Le Balbuzard fluviatile

=== Live albums ===
- 1977 : Julos au Théâtre de la ville
- 1987 : J'ai vingt ans de chansons
- 1991 : Julos au Casino de Paris
- 1998 : Le Navigateur solitaire sur la mer des mots
- 2002 : Chansons d'amour (double cd)

=== Compilations, boxset ===
- 1988 : Bornes acoustiques (compilation)
- 1989 : L'intégrale CD 67/87 (contient 19 albums originaux)
- 2011 : Les Voix de la poésie

=== Tribute albums ===
- 2003 : 10 doigts 6 cordes (16 mélodies de Julos Beaucarne à la guitare par Patrick de Schuyter)
- 2008 : Ils chantent Julos (22 artistes belges, français et québécois chantent Julos)

=== EP ===
- 1964 : Une poire pour la mort
- 1965 : Le Sort d'ici-bas
- 1966 : Le Petit Royaume
- 1967 : Julos chante Max Elskamp et Julos chante Écaussinnes
- 1973 : Brassens et Vigneault adaptés en wallon
- 1994 : Regard sur le rétroviseur (CD, vendu au profit de SOS Enfants)

== Bibliography ==
- 1973 Répertoire d'étiquettes (Éditions Louise-Hélène France)
- 1975 Julos écrit pour vous (Éditions Duculot)
- 1977 Aujourd'hui nous parlerons de notre Sibérie à nous la Fagne (Éditions LHF)
- 1980 Mon terroir c'est les galaxies (Éditions LHF)
- 1985 Entre le dire et le non-dire (Éditions de la Lettre douce)
- 1986 Étiquettes pour école cathodique (Éditions LHF)
- 1987 J'ai vingt ans de chansons (Éditions Didier Hatier)
- 1988 Le familier des nébuleuses (Éditions ADda)
- 1989 L'appel de madame la baronne (Éditions Casterman)
- 1990 Brel (Éditions Acropole)
- 1991 9 chemins de non-retour (Éditions Æncrages & Co)
- 1992 Objets détournés (Éditions LHF)
- 1992 Le Virelangue (Éditions Actes Sud)
- 1993 Daniela (Éditions Magermans)
- 1994 Voyage à la lisière de l'infini (Le Fennec éditeur)
- 1995 L'avenir change de berceau (Éditions du Perron)
- 1996 Réédition de Julos écrit pour vous (Éditions de l'Archipel)
- 1997 Le navigateur solitaire sur la mer des mots (Éditions les Éperonniers)
- 1999 Monde neuf (Éditions de l'Archipel)
- 1999 Réédition de Brel en livre de poche (Éditions Ancrage)
- 2000 Au fil de la tendresse (Éditions Ancrage)
- 2000 Le navigateur solitaire sur la mer des mots (Isabelle Quentin éditeur)
- 2000 Les arbres chemins entre ciel et terre (Éditions Éole)
- 2001 RaveL ou l'aventure est au bout de la roue (La renaissance du livre)
- 2002 Front de libération de l'oreille et autres considérations (Le grand miroir)
- 2002 Julos' biography by Laurence van Brabant « il était 9 fois Julos Beaucarne » (Le Grand Miroir)
- 2002 Bon appétit Julos (Textes et recettes du terroir, avec Nicole Darchambeau - Éditions Les Capucines)
- 2004 Objets détournés de la Galaxie Julos (Éditions Louise Hélène France)
- 2006 Noémie la petite fourmi (Conte illustré par Johanna Dupont - Éditions Norina)
- 2007 Les chaussettes de l'archiduchesse (Recueil de virelangues, avec la collaboration de Pierre Jaskarzec - Éditions Points)
- 2009 Mon petit royaume (Œuvre complète)
