= Lasne =

Municipality in Walloon Brabant province, Wallonia, Belgium

- Municipality
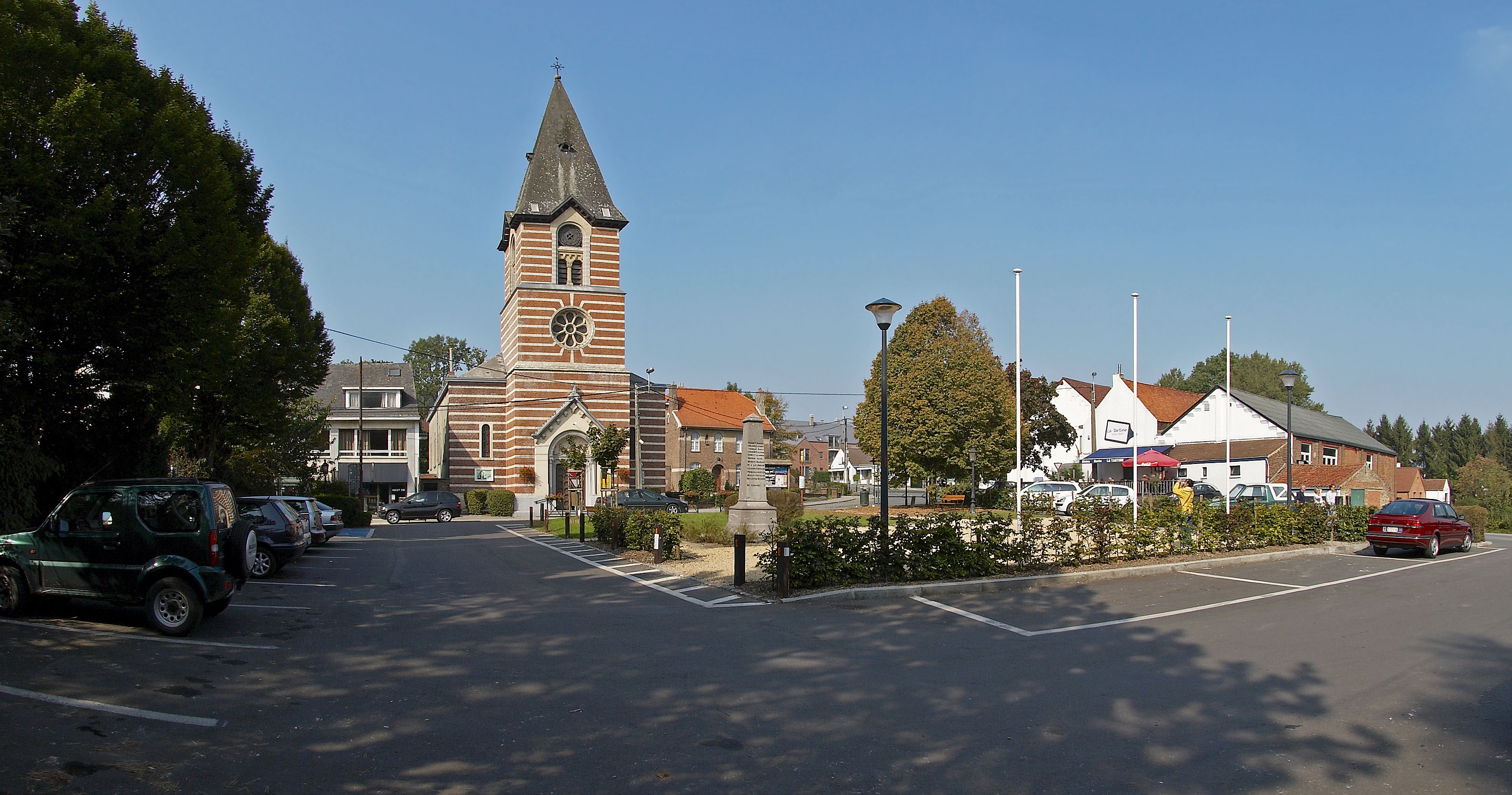
- Saint Gertrude church in Lasne

- Flag Coat of arms

- The municipality of Lasne in Walloon Brabant
- Interactive map of Lasne
- Location in Belgium
- Coordinates: 50°41′N 04°29′E
- Country: Belgium
- Community: French Community
- Region: Wallonia
- Province: Walloon Brabant
- Arrondissement: Nivelles

Government
  - Mayor: Laurence Rothier (MR-IC)
  - Governing party: MR-IC

Area
  - Total: 47.57 km^{2} (18.37 sq mi)

Population (2018-01-01)
  - Total: 14,236
  - Density: 299.3/km^{2} (775.1/sq mi)
- Postal codes: 1380
- NIS code: 25119
- Area codes: 02
- Website: www.lasne.be

Lasne (French pronunciation: [lan]; Walloon: Lane) is a municipality of Wallonia located in the province of Walloon Brabant, Belgium, south east of Brussels.

In 2008, Lasne had a population of 14,043. The total area is 47.22 km² which gives a population density of 297 inhabitants per km². Lasne is the richest municipality in Wallonia, measured by the average taxable income of the inhabitants. It also has the lowest local taxes of any municipality in Belgium.

The municipality consists of the following districts: Couture-Saint-Germain, Lasne-Chapelle-Saint-Lambert, Maransart, Ohain, and Plancenoit (including the hamlet of Marache).

While the municipality has taken the name of Lasne, the administrative offices are in the village of Ohain.

Ohain contains an example of a Brabant-Wallon village green: almost triangular in shape and sloping gently. The green contains many mature trees and is bordered on 2 sides by old houses and shops. The church in Ohain was built around the year 1200 and the strongly built square tower dates from this time.

The village of Couture-Saint-Germain contains the ruins of the Cistercian Abbey of Aywiers which has been the subject of pilgrimages since the late 19th century in honour of Saint Lutgarde who lived there for 30 years in the first half of the 13th century.

Part of the Battle of Waterloo was fought in the village of Plancenoit, notably around the church and the fortified farm of La Papelotte. The cemetery wall is said to still contain holes made by musket balls. It was in Plancenoit that Blücher's troops engaged Napoleon's army, having marched from Wavre. Blücher and Wellington met after the battle at the farm 'La Belle Alliance' - now a bar. The current historic area commemorating the battle is jointly administered by the municipalities of Lasne, Waterloo and Braine-l'Alleud.

== Geography ==
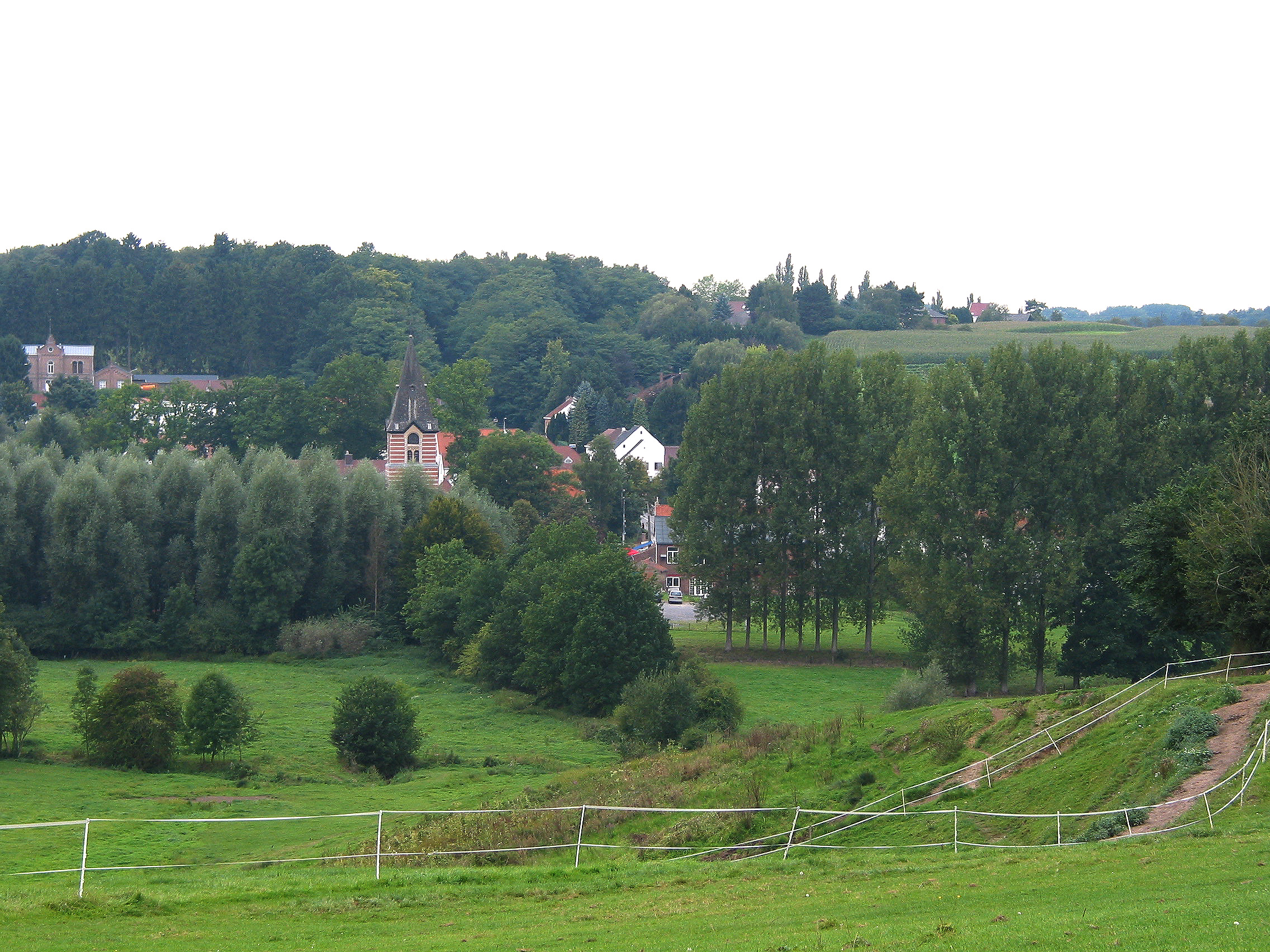
View of Lasne

The municipality takes its name from the river Lasne which rises in the village of Plancenoit and flows through several of the villages which make up the municipality. The name Lasne comes from the Celtic word meaning flat or calm, presumably referring to the slow moving river.

Lasne is in a region of Belgium known as the Pays Romain or Roman Land. The Grand Chemin is a major road traversing the municipality, linking the large towns of Wavre and Nivelles, and formed a part of a network of Roman roads ultimately linking the ports of the Rhine and Seine with sea ports. The distance between small chapels on this path is equal to one or more leagues, or at a precise fraction of a Gaulish league, where a Gaulish league equals 2,222 metres (2,430 yd).

== Economy ==
Lasne is a semi-rural municipality retaining several working farms. 66% of the land area is rural, of which 66% is agricultural land, and the remainder, forest and open areas. In the past, there were a silk factory and sand extraction, although there is no longer any industry within the municipality.

In 2007, Lasne was still considered as the richest municipality of Belgium, with an average taxable income of 40,949 euros per year according to the latest report of the INS (Institut National de Statistique).

== Twin towns ==
The municipality is twinned with Azay-le-Rideau (France) and Abbeville, Louisiana (USA).
