= François Antoine Teste =

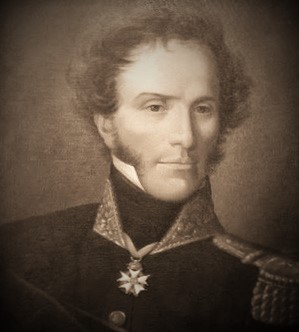
François Antoine Teste

General of Division François Antoine Teste, Baron Teste (French pronunciation: [fʁɑ̃swa ɑ̃twan tɛst]; 19 November 1775 in Bagnols-sur-Cèze – 8 December 1862 Angoulême) was a French officer during the Napoleonic Wars. He was in the French Chamber of Peers from 1839 to 1848.
