= Couture-Saint-Germain =

Village and district in Walloon Brabant, Belgium

Coordinates: 50°40′N 4°28′E

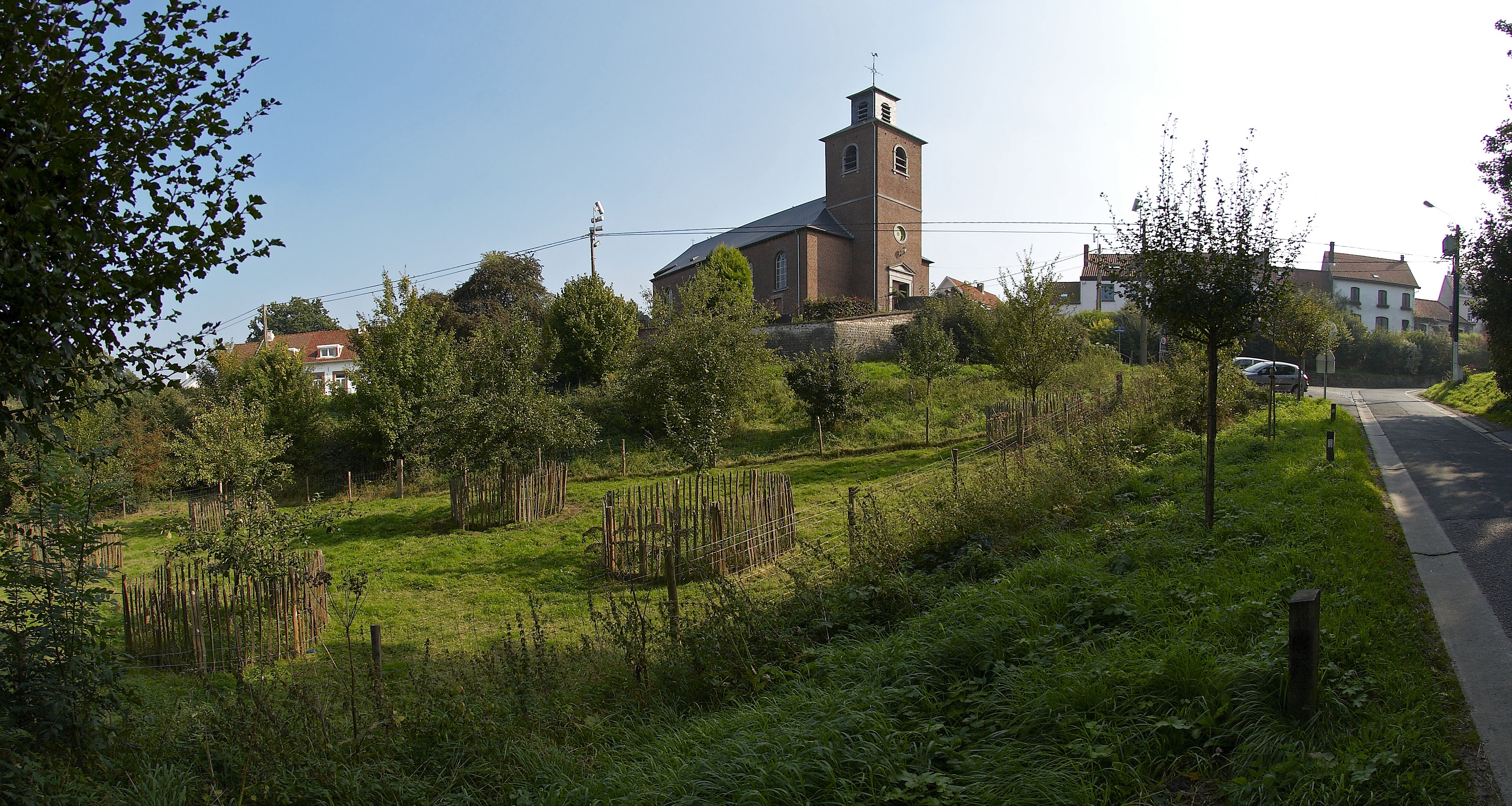
The Church in Couture-Saint-Germain

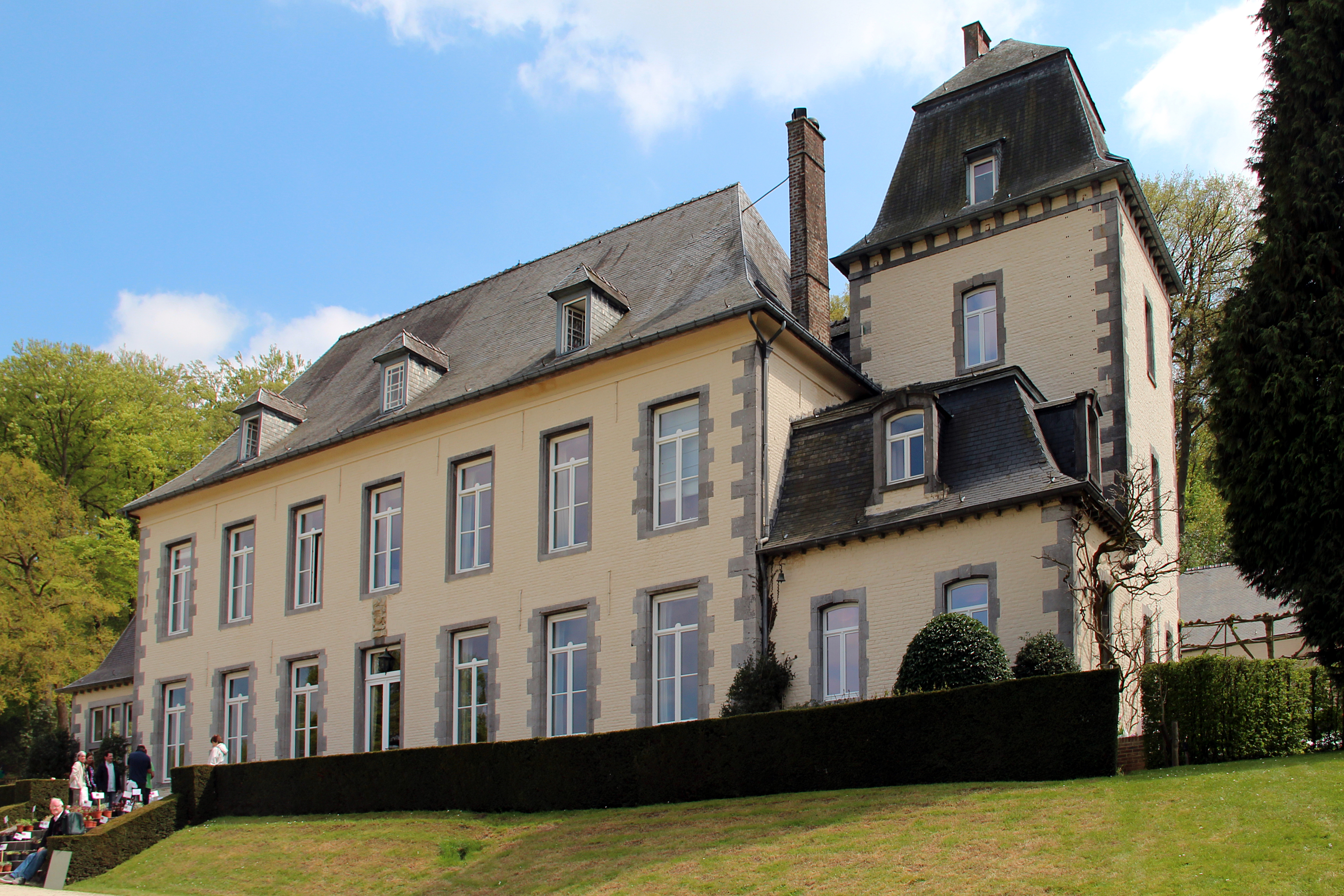
Abbey of Aywiers

Couture-Saint-Germain (French pronunciation: [kutyʁ sɛ̃ ʒɛʁmɛ̃]; Walloon: Coûteure-Sint-Djermwin) is a village of Wallonia and a district of the municipality of Lasne, located in the province of Walloon Brabant, Belgium.

The village was formed long ago. The Cistercian Abbey of Aywiers was established here in the early 13th century.
Saint Lutgardis of Aywiers lived in the Abbey.
