= List of Waterloo Battlefield locations =

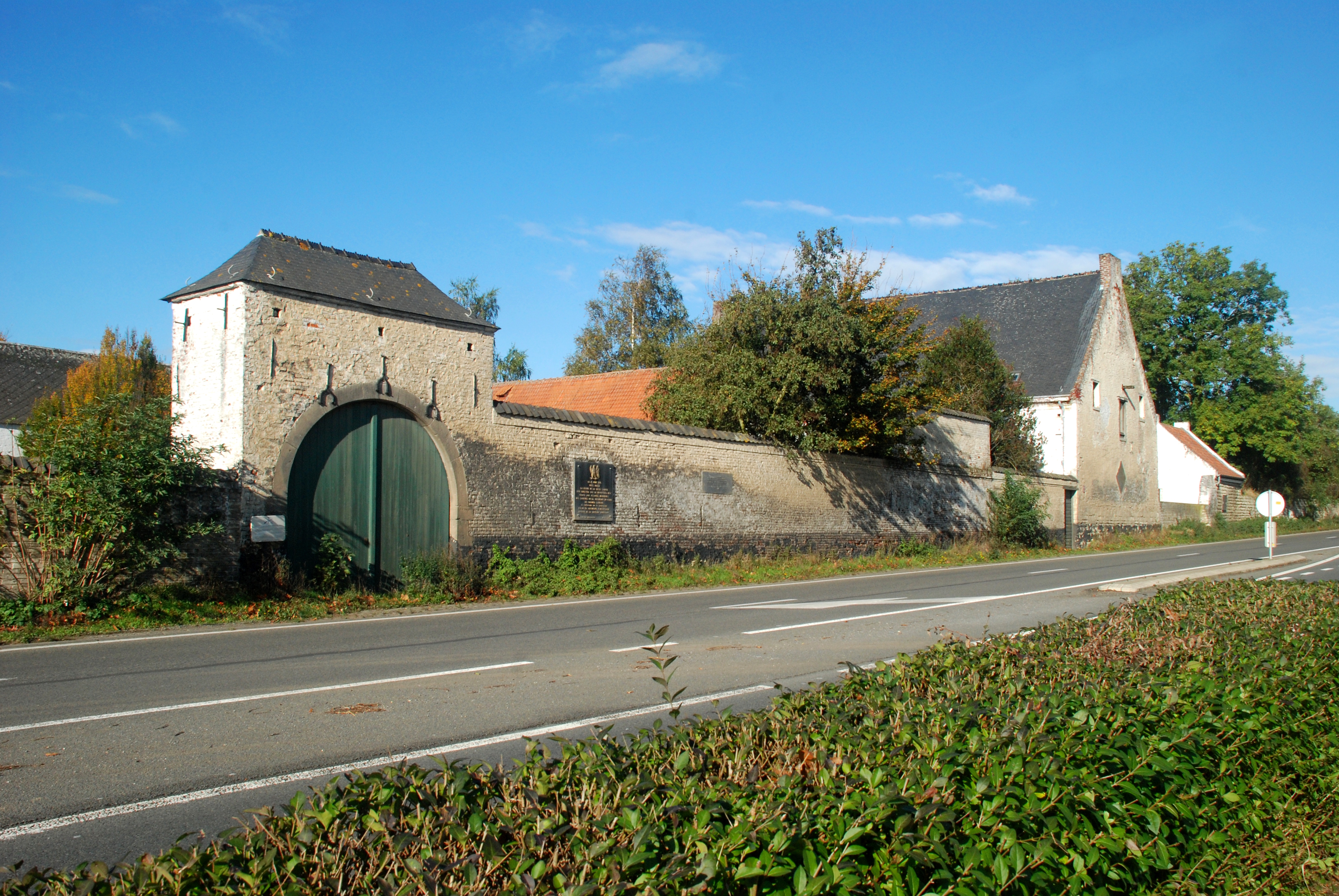
La Haye Sainte.

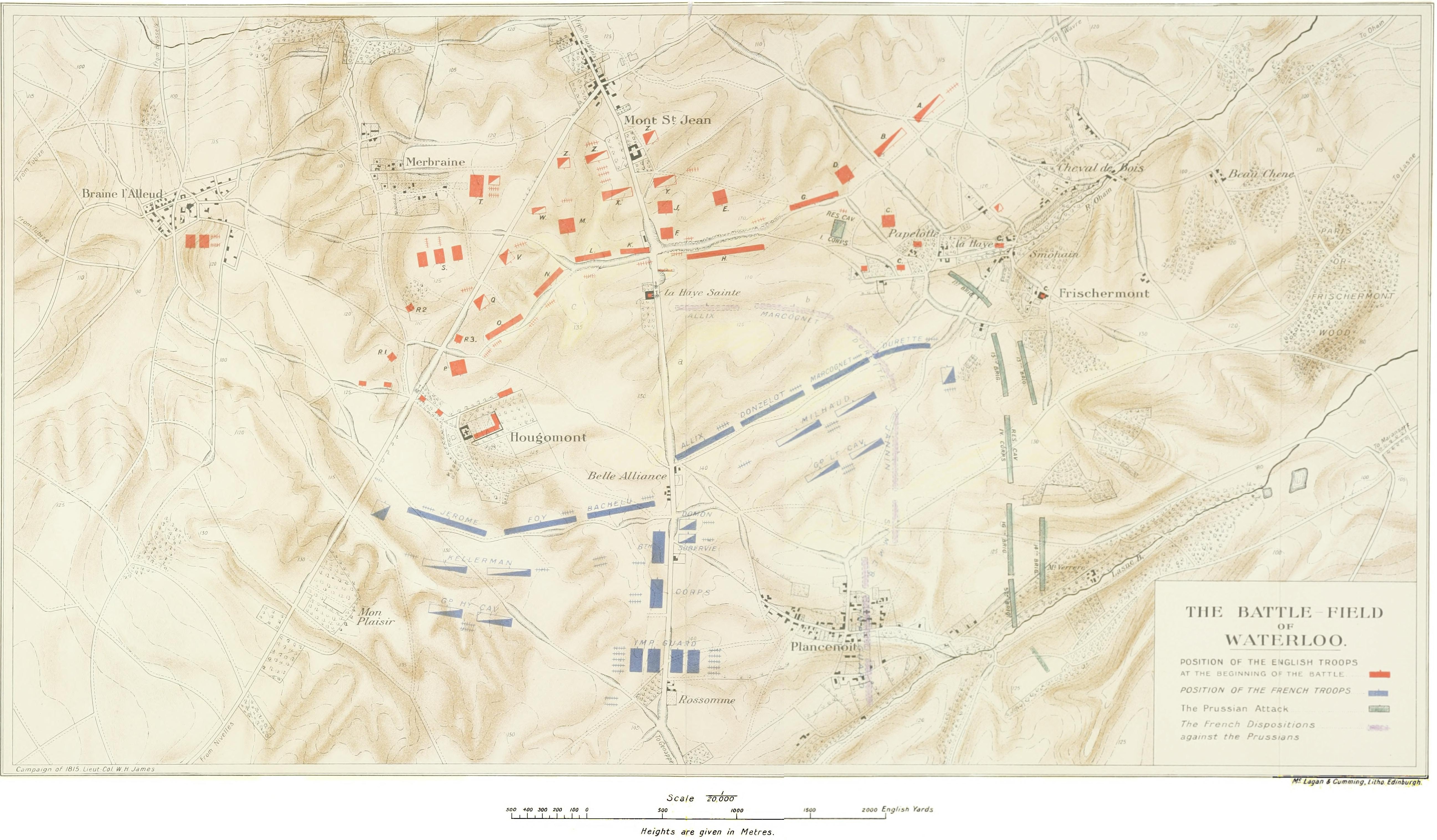
A map of the Battle of Waterloo with contours.

The Waterloo Battlefield is located in the municipalities of Braine-l'Alleud and Lasne and Waterloo, about 20 kilometres (12 mi) south of Brussels, and about 2 kilometres (1.2 mi) from the town of Waterloo. The ordering of the places in the list is north to south and west to east.

== North of the line of battle ==
- Sonian Forest—50°46′0″N 4°25′0″E—lies to the north of the battlefield on the approach to Brussels. Napoleon Bonaparte in Mémoires pour servir à l'histoire de France en 1815, avec le plan de la bataille de Mont-Saint-Jean repeatedly criticised the Duke of Wellington's choice of the battlefield because of the forest to his rear. For example on page 207 — "The position of Mont-Saint-Jean was ill-chosen. The first requisite of a field of battle, is, to have no defiles in its rear. The injudicious choice of his field of battle, rendered all retreat impossible". This criticism has itself been criticised, with various explanations as to why Bonaparte was wrong.
- Waterloo, Belgium —50°43′2.89″N 4°23′52.48″E —It is now a small town, but at the time of the battle it was a village in which most of the senior Anglo-allied officers were billeted the nights before and after the battle. It was here that Wellington wrote his after-battle report (dispatch to Lord Bathurst, 19 June 1815). The inn in which Wellington stayed was located opposite the Church of Saint Joseph and is now the Wellington Museum (50°43′3.5004″N 4°23′53.25″E).
- The farm of Mont-Saint-Jean, Waterloo—50°41′9.1″N 4°24′35.71″E—is slightly to the south of the hamlet of the same name and is located on the plateau behind the battle line. Mont-Saint-Jean was the name given to the battle by Napoleon.

== Western end of the line of battle ==
- Châteaux Hougoumont—50°40′14.27″N 4°23′41.28″E—A large farmhouse held by the British Guards throughout the day in a battle within a battle. Wellington described the closing of the gates after the French had broken into the courtyard to be the single most significant event to happen during the Battle of Waterloo, and it is the subject of the memorial to the British Army, placed just outside the gates that was unveiled on 17 June 2015.
- Lion's Mound—50°40′42″N 4°24′17″E—A memorial built shortly after the battle. A panoramic view of the battlefield can be seen from its summit.

== Centre of the line of battle ==
- The Waterloo Elm—50°40′48.58″N 4°24′42.08″E— Located just south west of the intersection of the sunken lane and the Genappe–Brussels main road, the Waterloo Elm was Wellington's command post for much of the battle. The tree was killed by souvenir hunters after the battle. It was felled in 1818 and made into furniture, which included a chair presented to George IV that remains in the British Royal Collection.
- La Haye Sainte–50°40′41″N 4°24′42.67″E —A farmhouse and a key bastion for the defence of Wellington's line held by about 400 riflemen of the Kings German Legion. It was eventually captured by the French.

== Eastern end of the line of battle ==
The following four locations provided the eastern bulwark of the Anglo-allied line:

- Papelotte — 50°40′49″N 4°26′02″E — A hastily fortified farmhouse similar to La Haye Sainte
- La Haye, Lasne — 50°40′49.55″N 4°26′10.39″E — A hastily fortified farmhouse less than 150 metres (160 yd) to the east of Papelotte, but its farmyard was not fully enclosed.
- Smohain — 50°40′50.63″N 4°26′33.07″E — a hamlet in a defile which on the day of the battle contained a marshy stream swollen by the overnight rain.
- Châteaux Frischermont — 50°40′39.47″N 4°26′41.64″E — A hastily fortified châteaux similar to Hougoumont but not so heavily defended.

== South of the line of battle ==
- La Belle Alliance — 50°40′06.0″N 4°24′49.0″E — This inn was visible from the Waterloo Elm on the escarpment where Wellington marshalled his army. Napoleon spent some time observing the battle close to the inn and stood in one of the squares of Imperial Guard at the end of the battle before fleeing via Genappe. It is also reputed to be the place where Wellington and Blucher met at the end of the battle.
- Decoster's house — 50°39′50.72″N 4°24′49.72″E — At about 17:00 Napoleon moved to a hillock on the opposite side of the Brussels–Genappe road where he remained until about 19:00. He then advanced part of the way with the Imperial Guard past La Belle Alliance and into the valley below of La Haye Sainte, from where he observed the final attack of the Guard against the Anglo-allied line.
- Plancenoit — 50°39′38.38″N 4°25′46.24″E — There was heavy fighting between the French and the Prussians in the village.
- Rossomme — 50°39′24.3″N 4°24′47.99″E — Napoleon spent the first few hours of the battle (until 17:00) observing the battle from the heights on the other side of the Brussels–Genappe road sitting at a table with a map spread out on it. He may also have rested in the farmhouse during the battle. The heights (50°39′16.6″N 4°24′35.5″E) on the opposite side of the main road were also as far south as Wellington went on the night of the 18 June. Rossomme was destroyed in a fire in 1895.
- Caillou Museum — 50°38′45.96″N 4°25′14.77″E — Napoleon's headquarters on the night and early morning of the (17/18 June). The location of his breakfast conference where he told his marshals "Wellington is a bad general, the English are bad troops, and this affair is nothing more than eating breakfast".
- Chantelet —50°39′01.63″N 4°26′01.99″E — Marshal Ney stayed in Chantelet Farm on the night of 17/18 June. It is about 0.5 kilometres (0.31 mi) east of Caillou.

== Monuments ==
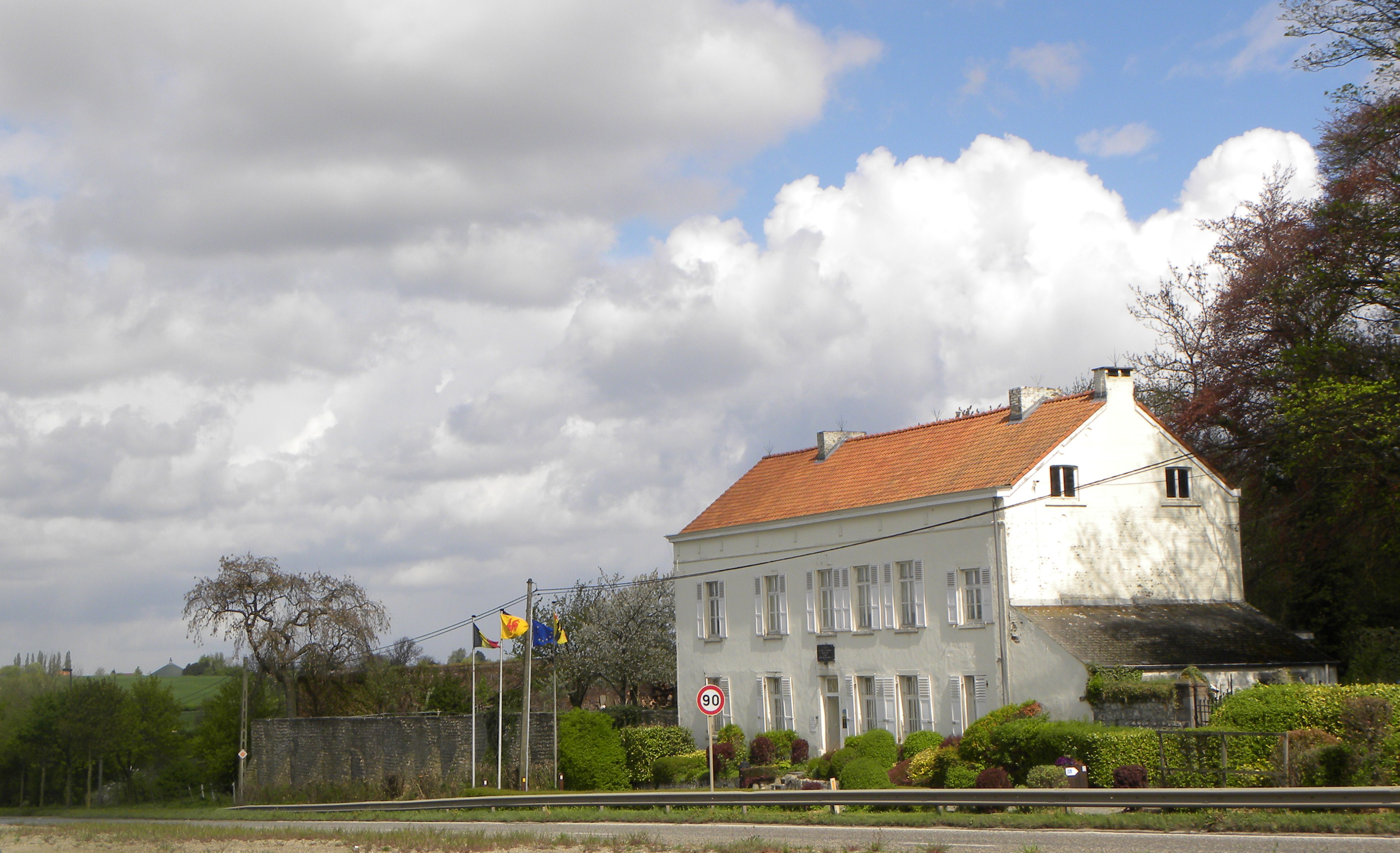
Napoleon's headquarters on the eve of the Battle (now the Musée du Caillou)

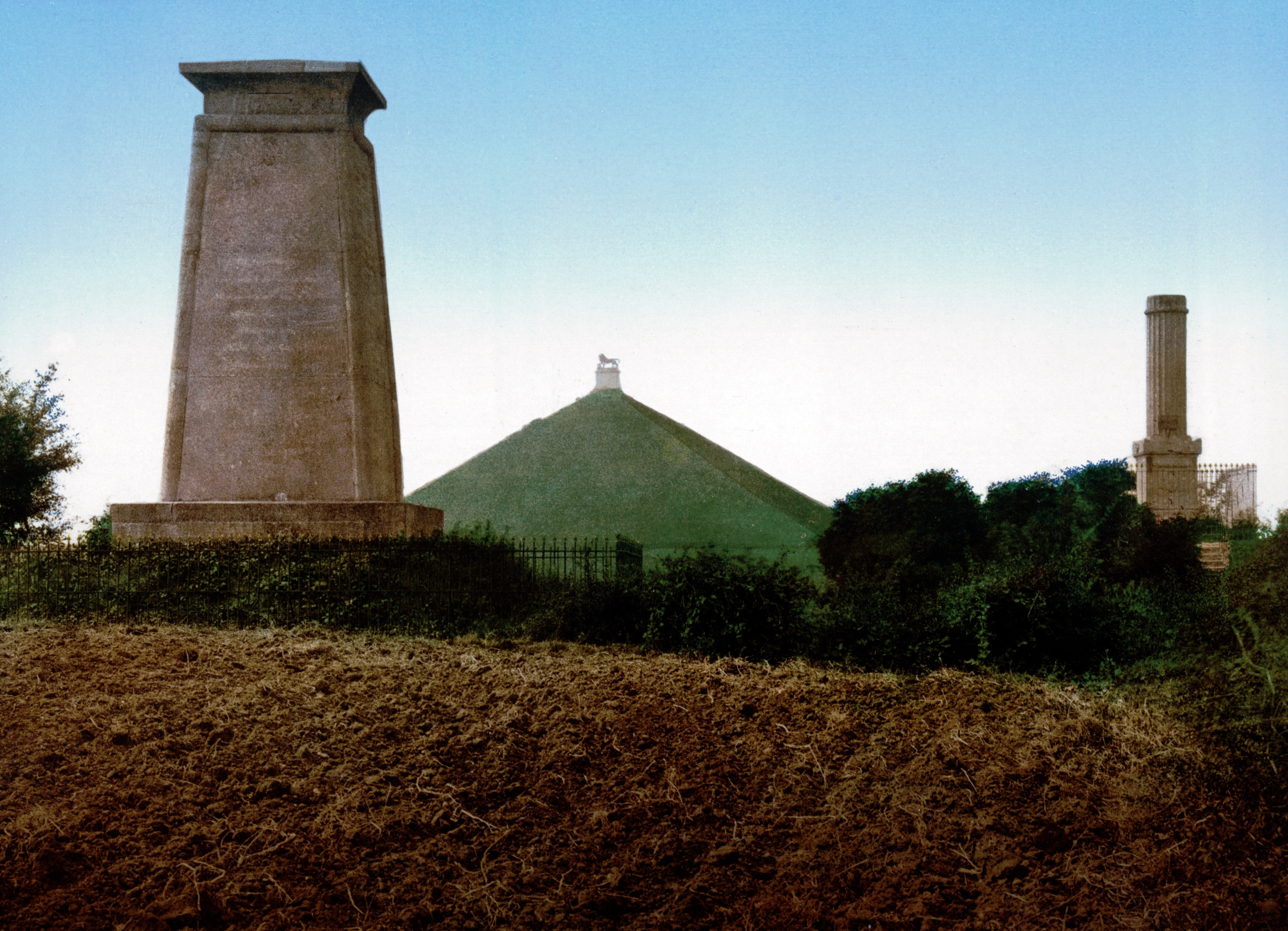
Monument to the King's German Legion (left), the Gordon Monument (right) and the Lion mound

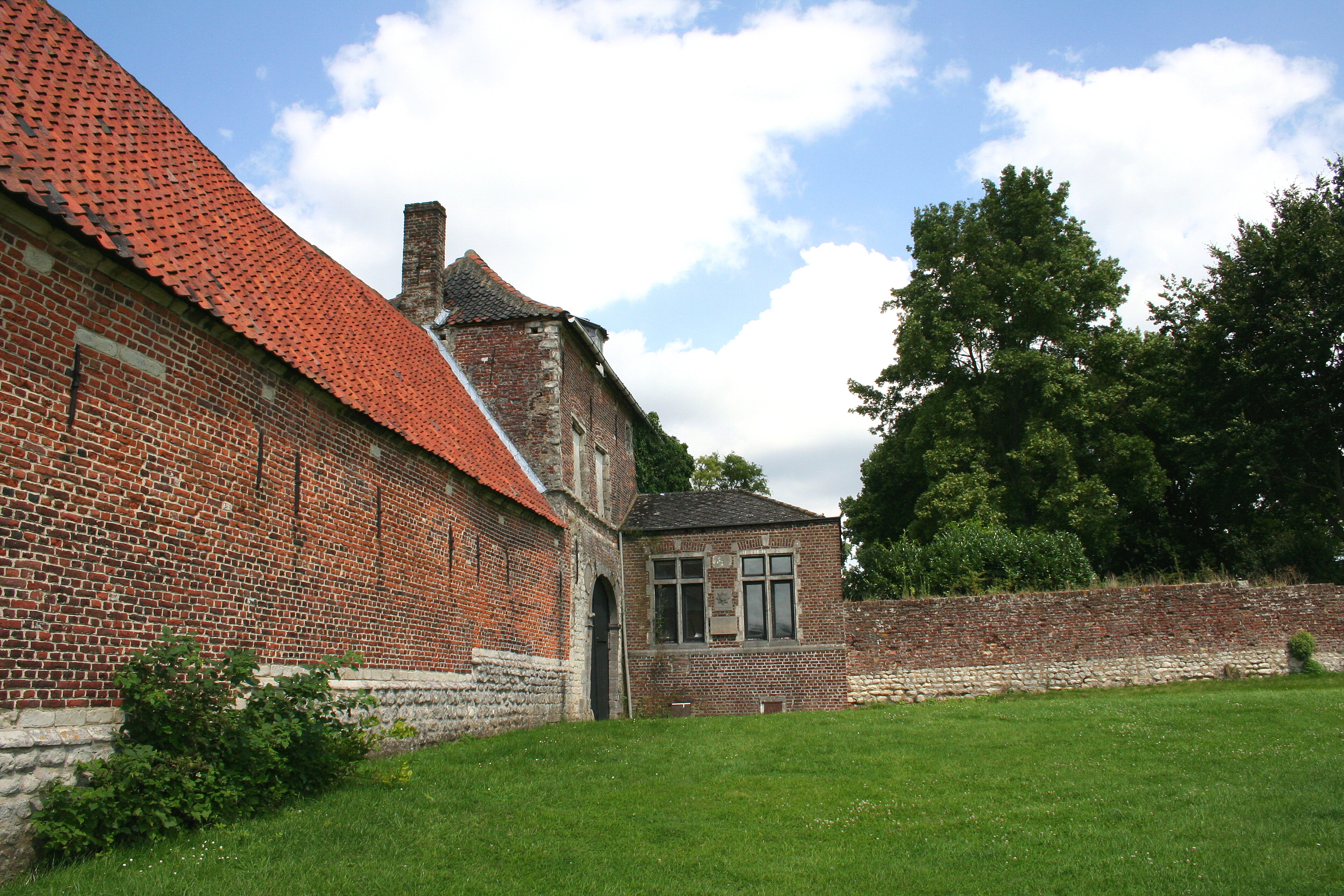
South Portal of the Goumont or Hougoumont farm (note that the hut on the wall was demolished due to being built before the battle)

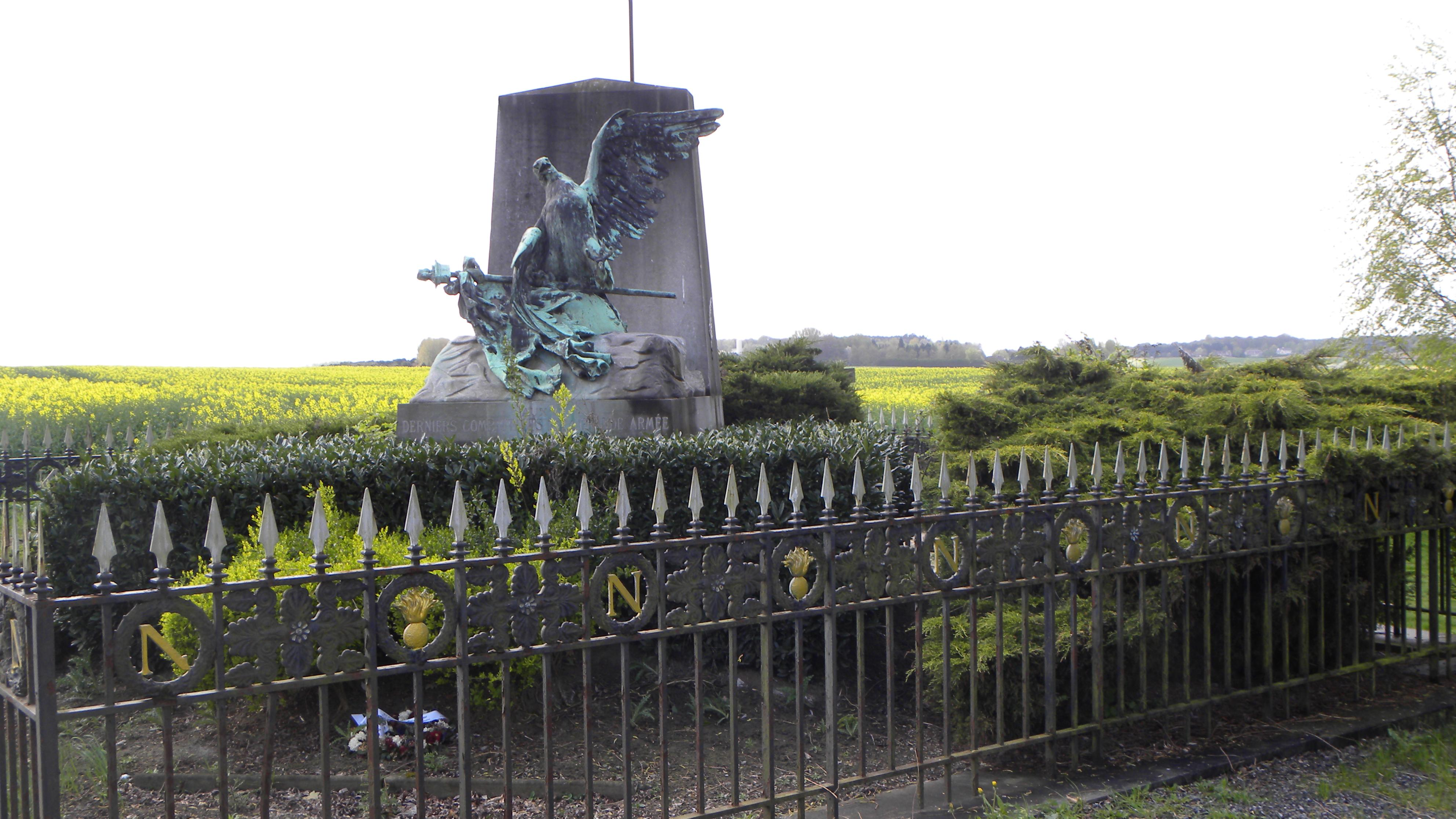
Monument to the last fighters of the Grand Army (The Wounded Eagle)

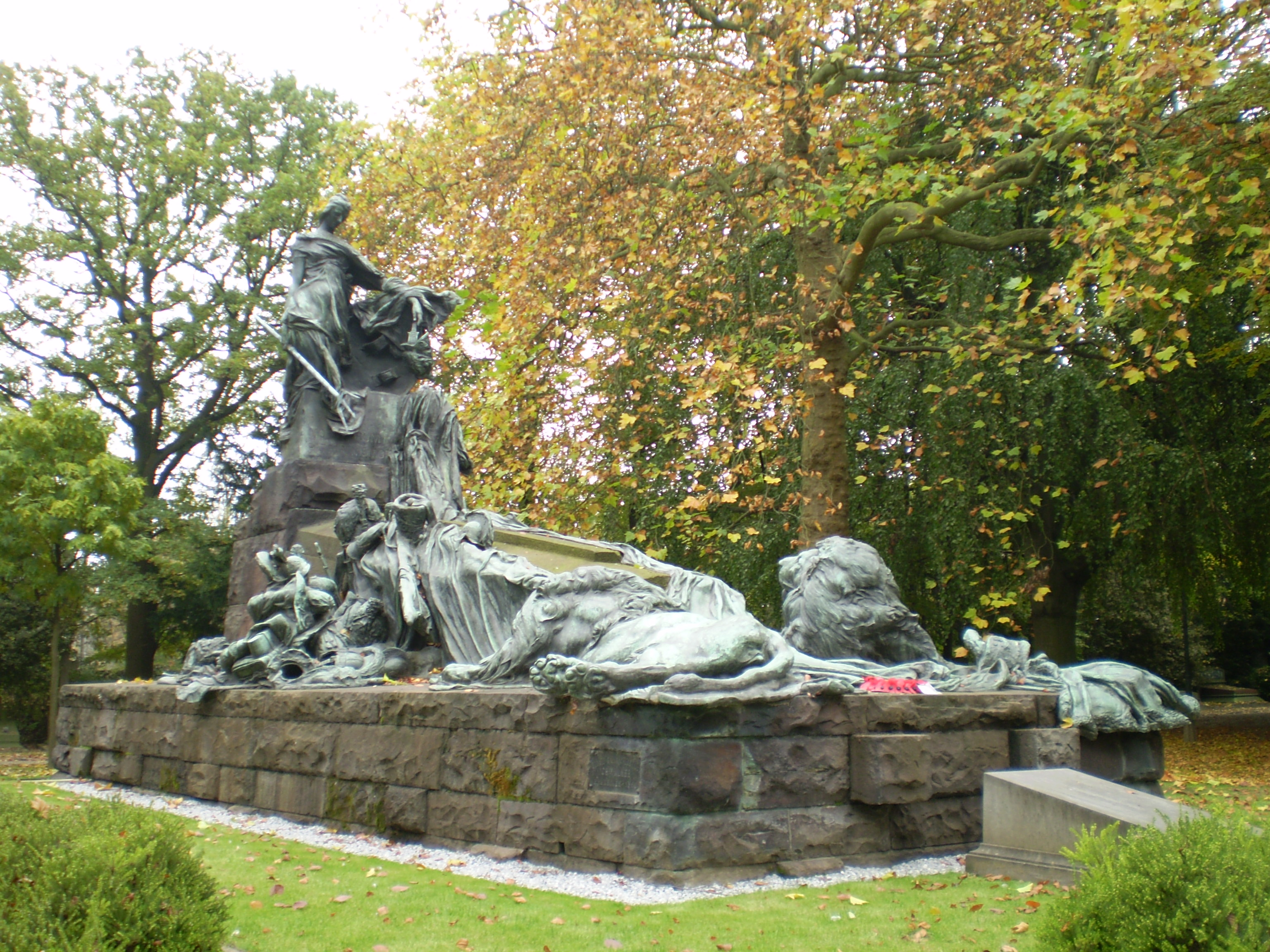
The British Waterloo Campaign Memorial at the Brussels Cemetery

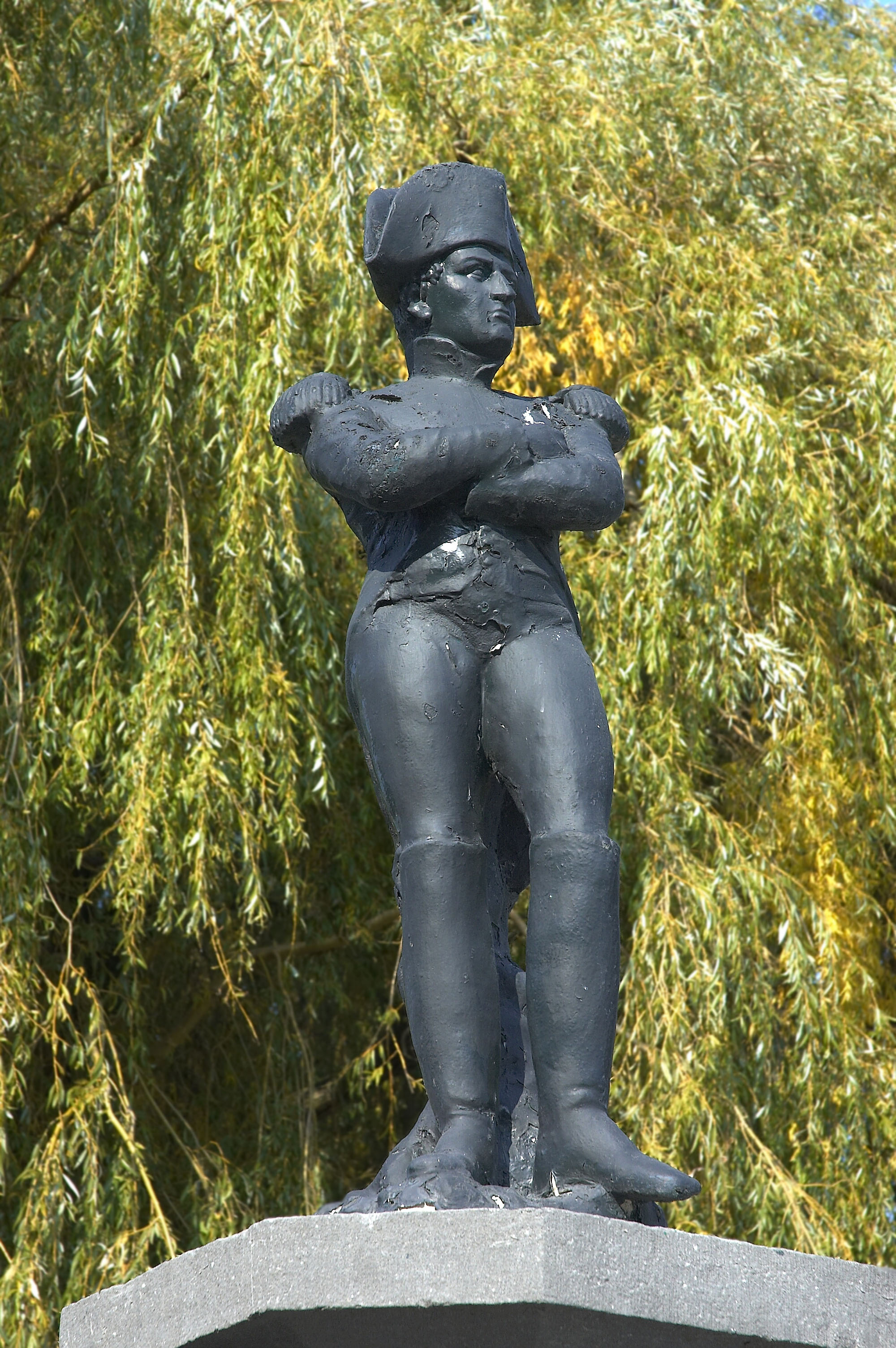
Waterloo, Napoleon statue erected close to the Bivouac de l'Empereur hostel

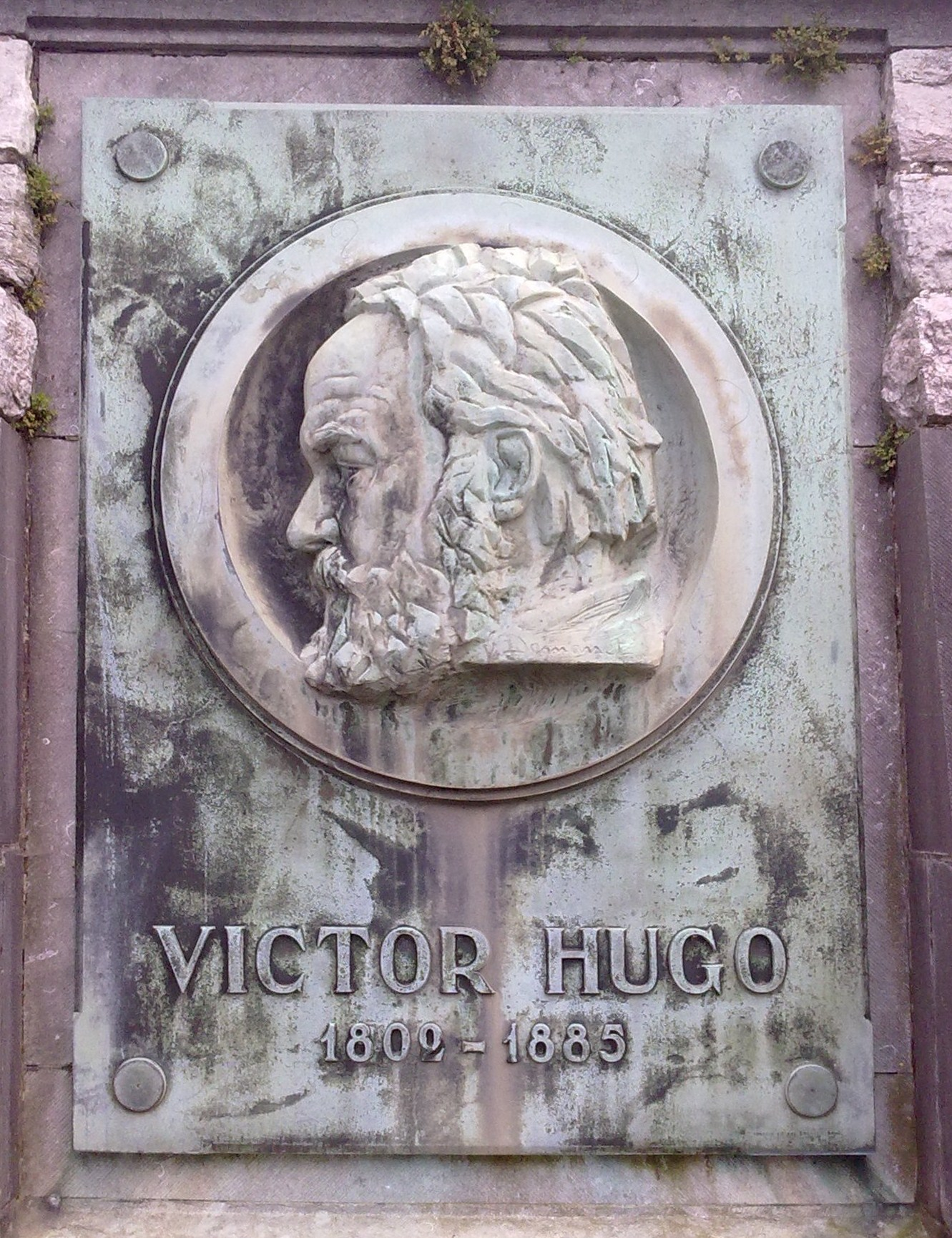
Victor Hugo column, portrait

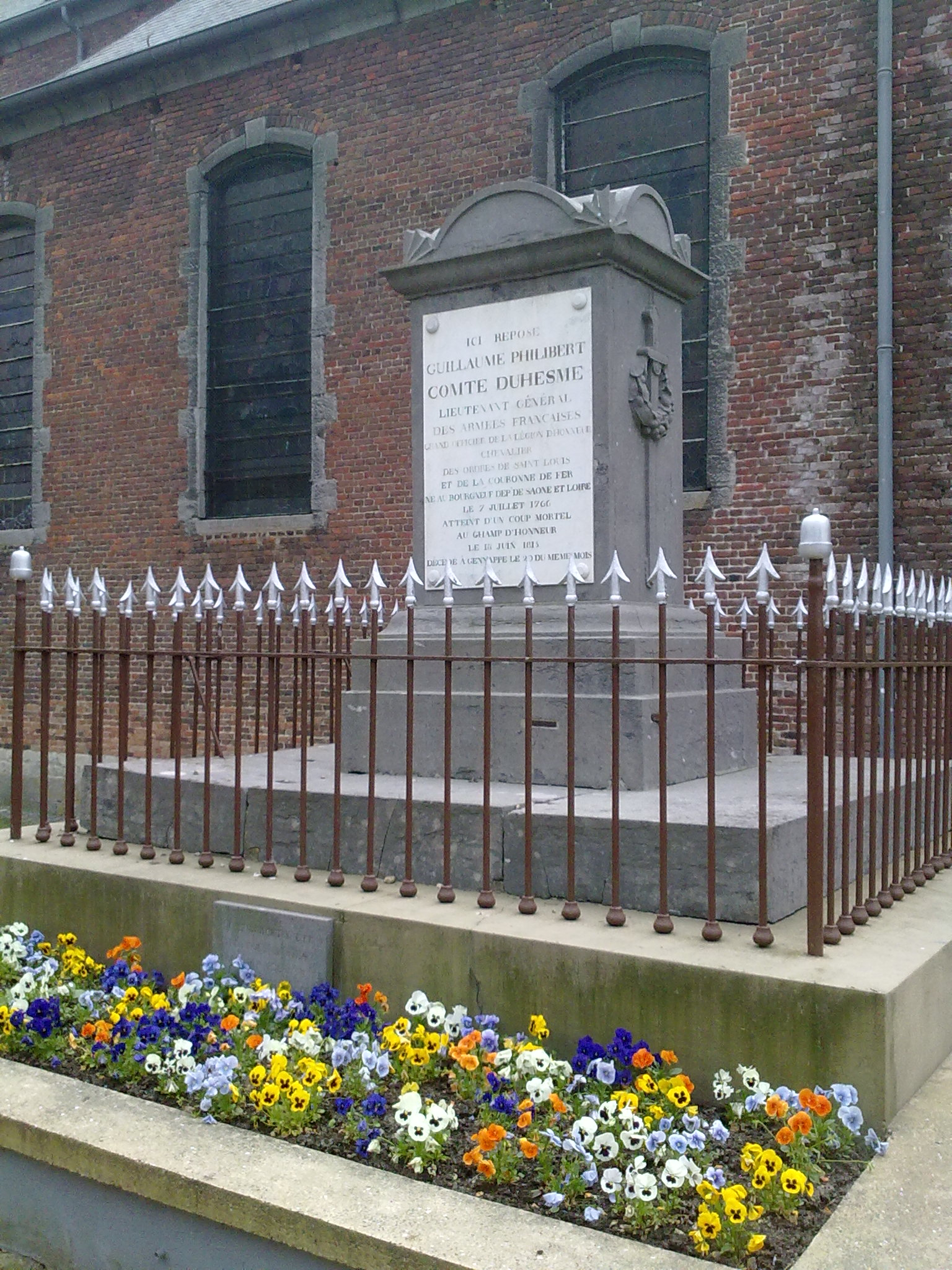
General Duhesme tomb in the churchyard of Saint Martin Church; Ways Genappe

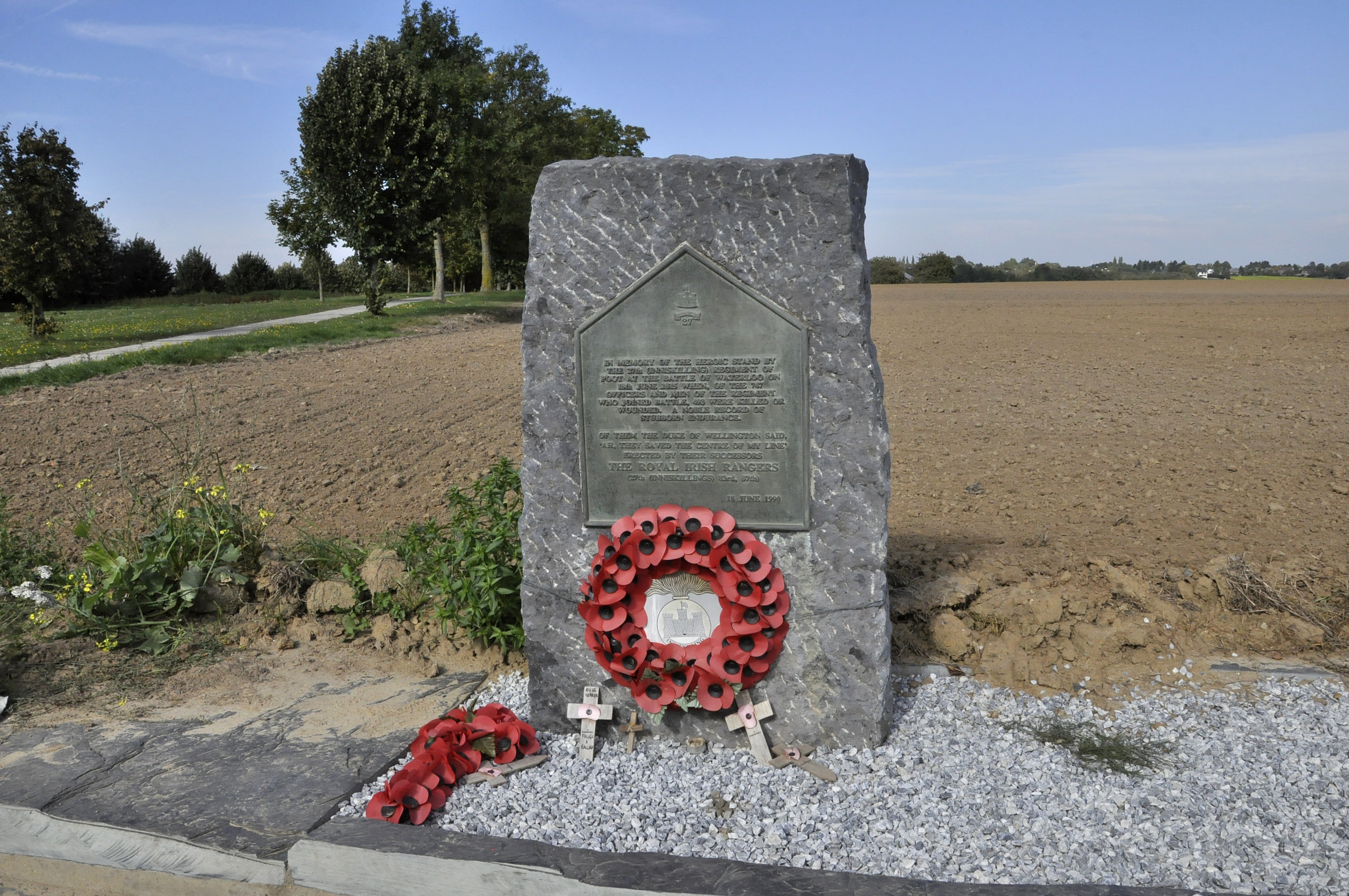
Stele to British 27th (Inniskilling) Regiment of Foot

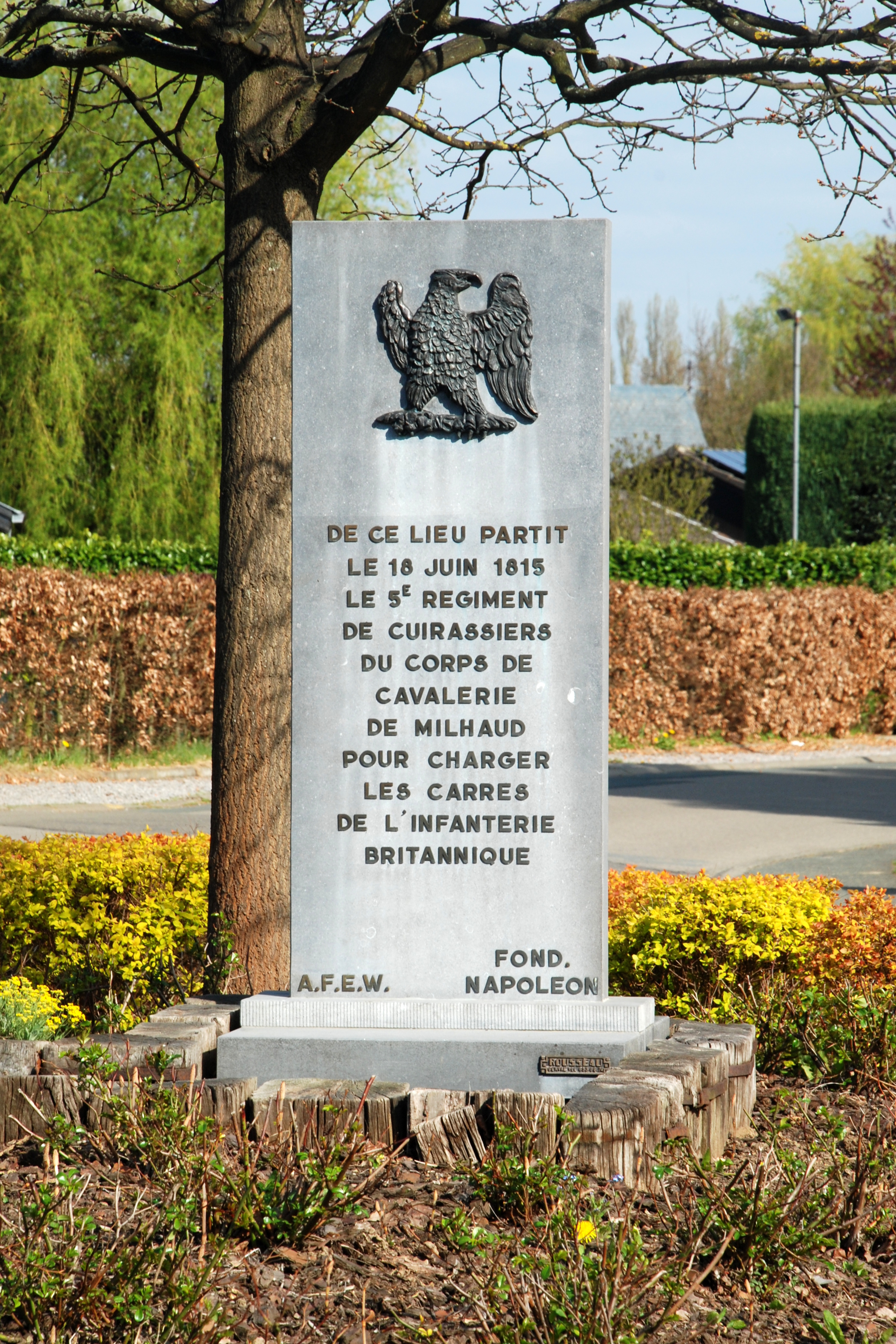
Stele to the French 5th Cuirassiers Regiment

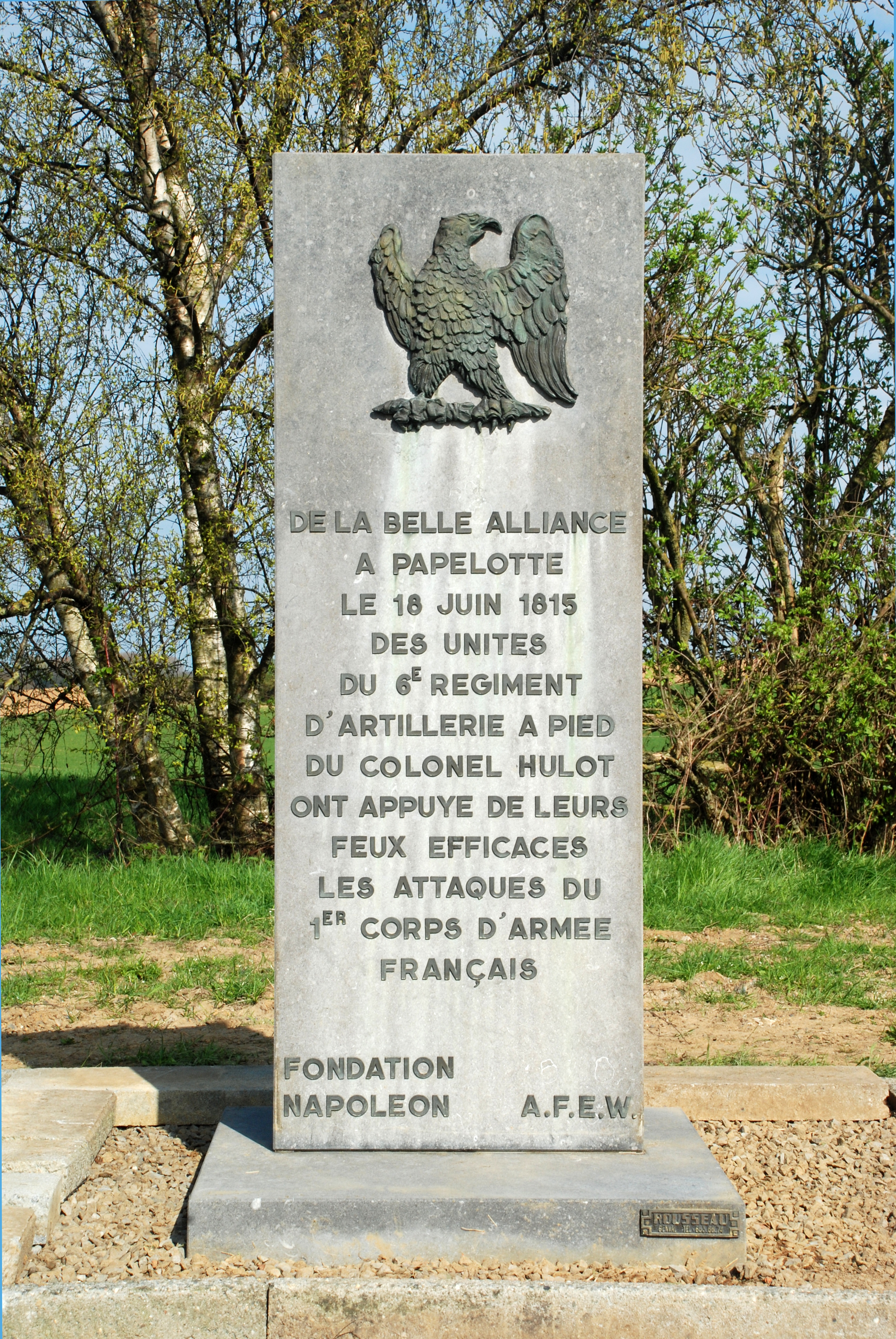
Stele to the French 6th Artillery Regiment

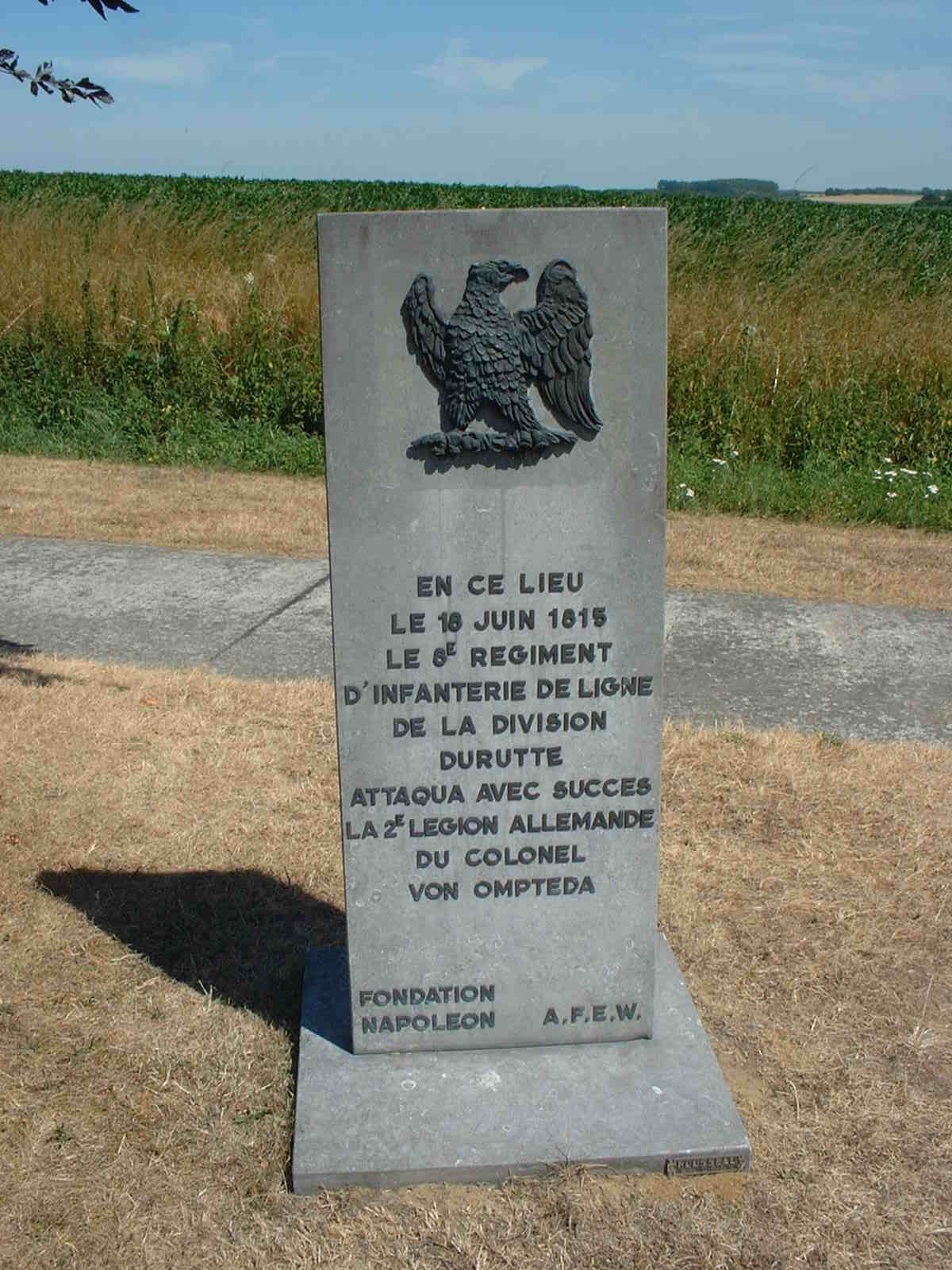
The 8th Infantry Regiment: In this place 18 June 1815 the 8th Infantry's Durutte Division successfully attacked the German 2nd Legion of Colonel von Ompteda. (Note: The monument to the French 8th Infantry Regiment is close to the KGL monument)

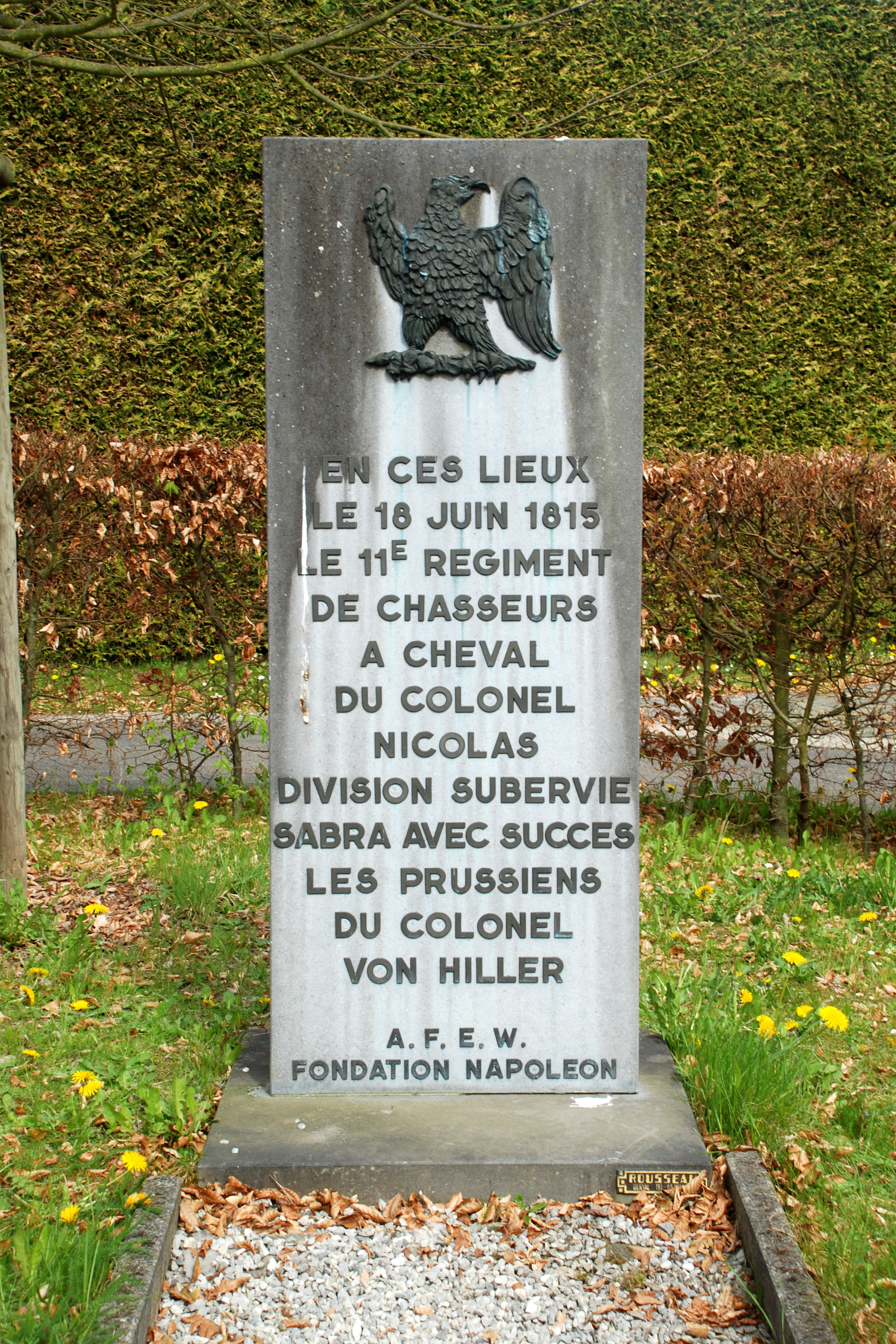
Stele to French 11th Chasseurs Regiment

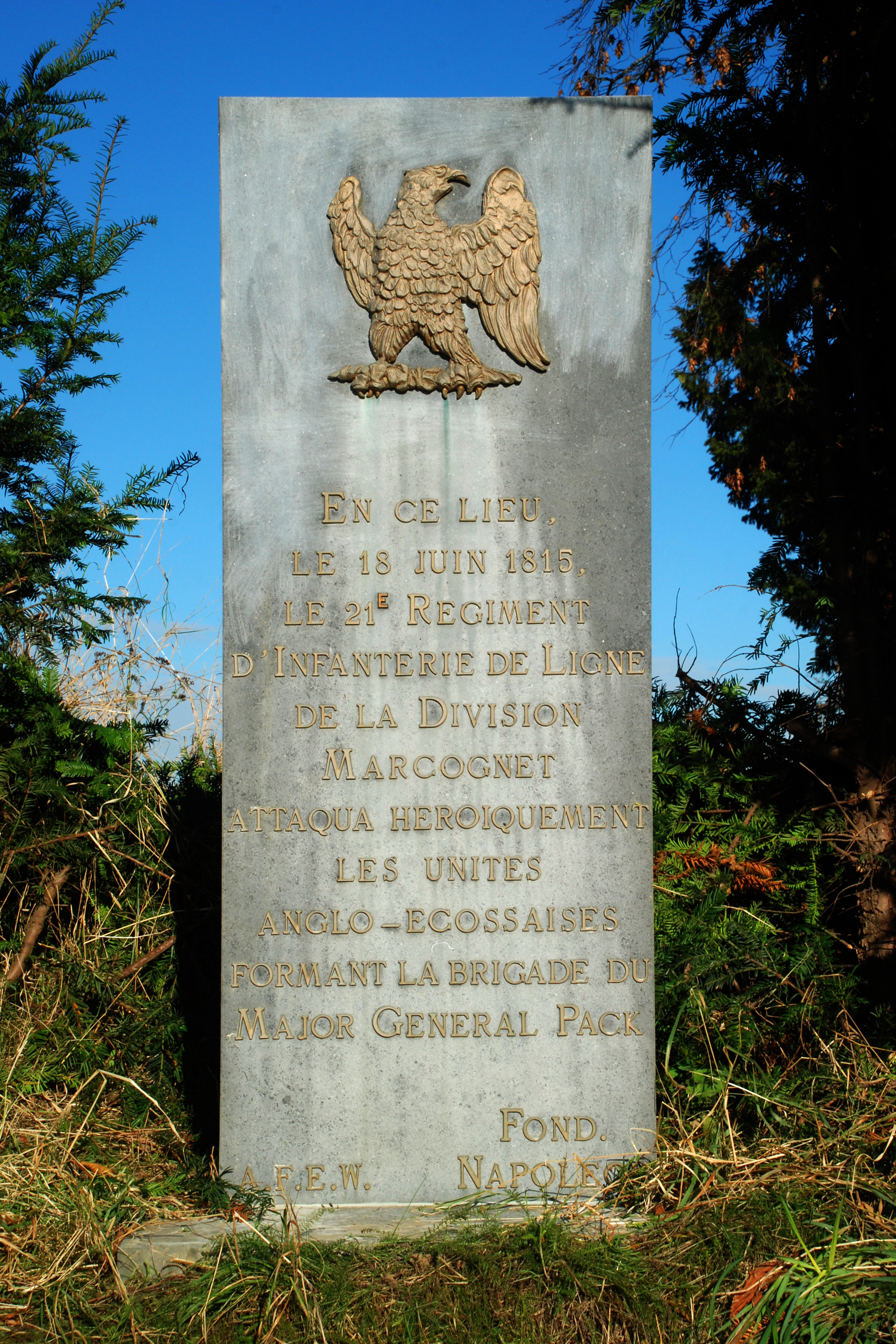
Stele to French 21st Infantry Regiment

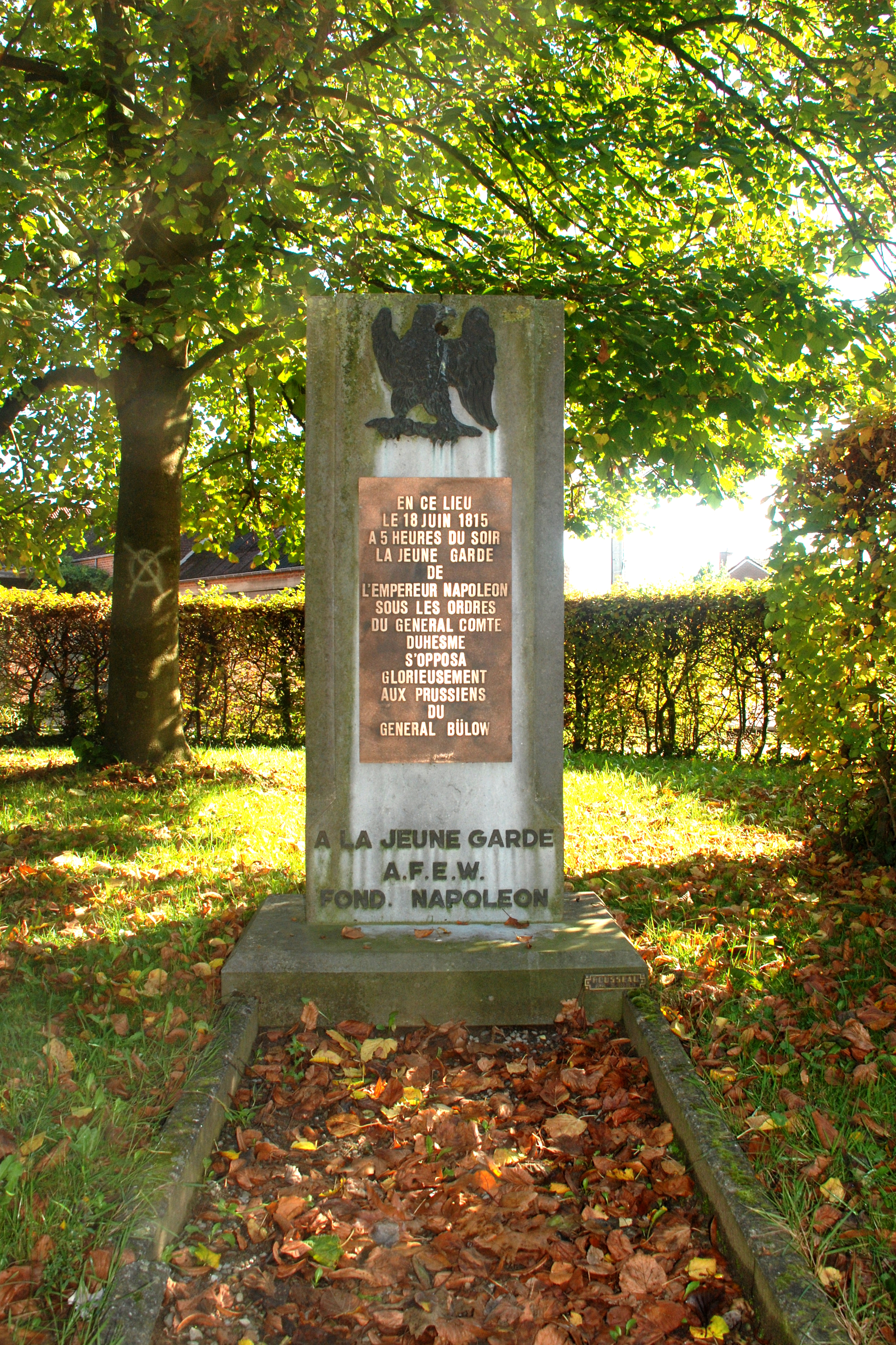
Stele to the French Young Guard.

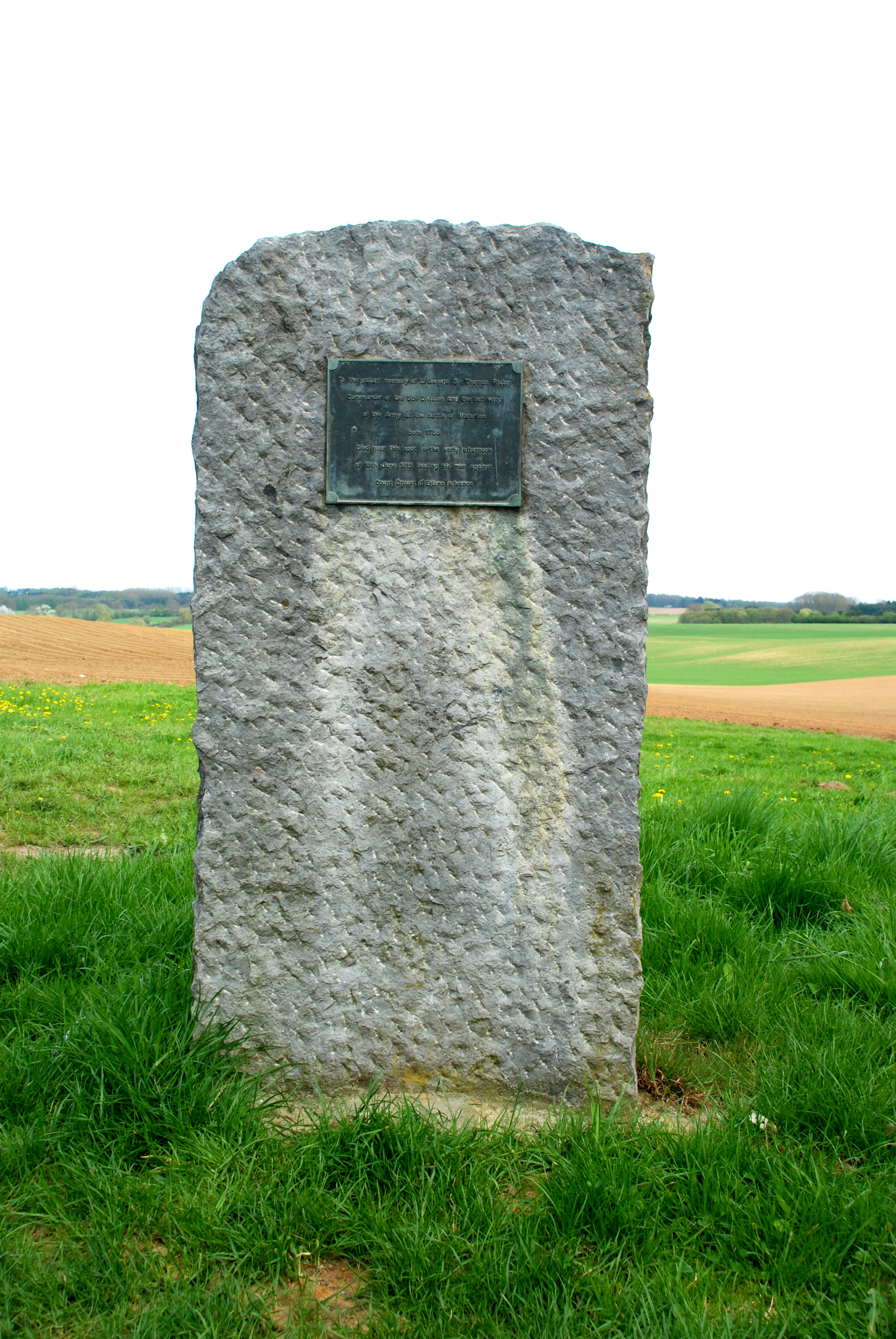
Stele to Lieutenant-General Sir Thomas Picton close to where he was killed.

== See also ==
- List of protected heritage sites in Waterloo, Belgium
- List of protected heritage sites in Braine-l'Alleud
- List of protected heritage sites in Lasne
- List of protected heritage sites in Genappe
