= La Haye, Lasne =

Former farm in the Belgian municipality of Lasne

Coordinates: 50.68043°N 4.43622°E

La Haye (French pronunciation: [la ɛ]) was a farm, in a hamlet of the same name, in the Belgian municipality of Lasne. (Note: In some sources the farm name is spelt La Haie.) It was destroyed by fire in 1910. During the Battle of Waterloo (18 June 1815) the farm was one of the fortified garrisoned points that made up a bulwark on the extreme left (eastern end) of the Duke of Wellington's Anglo-allied line.

== History ==
Along with La Haye, the eastern bulwark consisted of three other garrisoned and hastily fortified locations: less than 150 metres (160 yd) to the west was Papelotte farm which like la Hay was on the northern bank of a shallow valley. About 430 metres (470 yd) to the east was the hamlet of Smohain. At this point the valley had become a defile with a boggy stream at the bottom. The fourth location was the now ruined Châteaux Frischermont (then similar to the better known Châteaux Hougoumont which was located on the Anglo-allies right-hand flank ) which was about 700 metres (770 yd) to the south-east on a premonitory on other bank of the valley.

The bulwark was held during the day by Anglo-allied soldiers under the command of Prince Bernhard of Saxe-Weimar. At about 19:30 the vanguard of Prussian I Corps (Zieten's) linked up with the Anglo-allied army in this area.

== See also ==
- List of Waterloo Battlefield locations
