= Marache =

Coordinates: 50.68073°N 4.44252°E

Marache (French pronunciation: [maʁaʃ]), or historically Smohain, is hamlet of Wallonia in the municipalities of Lasne, district of Plancenoit, and Waterloo, in the province of Walloon Brabant, Belgium.

It is located in a defile through which runs the Smohain, a stream that rises just to the west of the hamlet.

Smohain, along with the two farms of Papelotte and La Haye (which are located on the northern bank closer to the head of the same valley about 600 metres (660 yd) and 430 metres (470 yd) west of the centre of the hamlet) and the now ruined Château Fichermont (on a premonitory 350 metres (380 yd) south of the hamlet) formed the eastern bulwark of the Duke of Wellington's Anglo-allied line during the Battle of Waterloo on 18 June 1815.

This was a strong defensive position as:

all these roads cut so deeply into the sandy clay hillside as a present extreme problems for cavalry or infantry in formation trying to cross them. The small stream running through marshland, the sunken roads and the defile itself were considerable military obstacles, particularly in view of the wet condition of the countryside on 18 June 1815.

Later in the battle it was the location where the Prussian right-hand flank joined forces with the Anglo-allies left-hand flank.

== See also ==
- List of Waterloo Battlefield locations
