= Napoleon's Last HQ =

Coordinates: 50°38′45.96″N 4°25′14.77″E

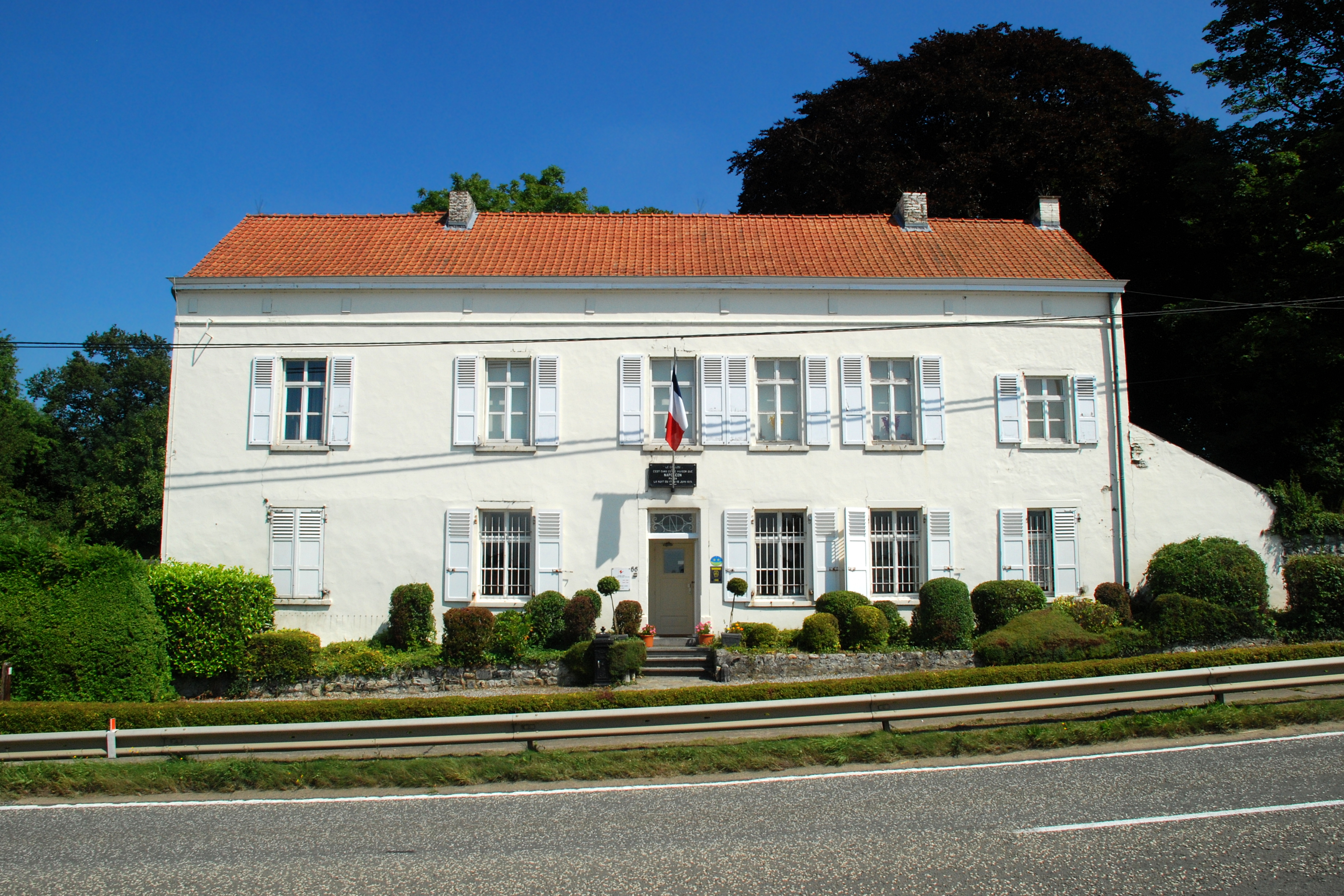
Napoleon's Last HQ

Napoleon's Last HQ (French: Le dernier QG de Napoléon) is a museum housed in the Ferme du Caillou (Caillou Farm) at Genappe, Belgium, where the Emperor Napoleon stayed the night before the Battle of Waterloo on 18 June 1815. The site is located 4 kilometres (2.5 miles) south of the Lion of Waterloo, at Chaussée de Bruxelles 66, 1472 Genappe. Travelling north, the high road passes pass over the Waterloo battlefield through Waterloo and on to Brussels.

== History ==
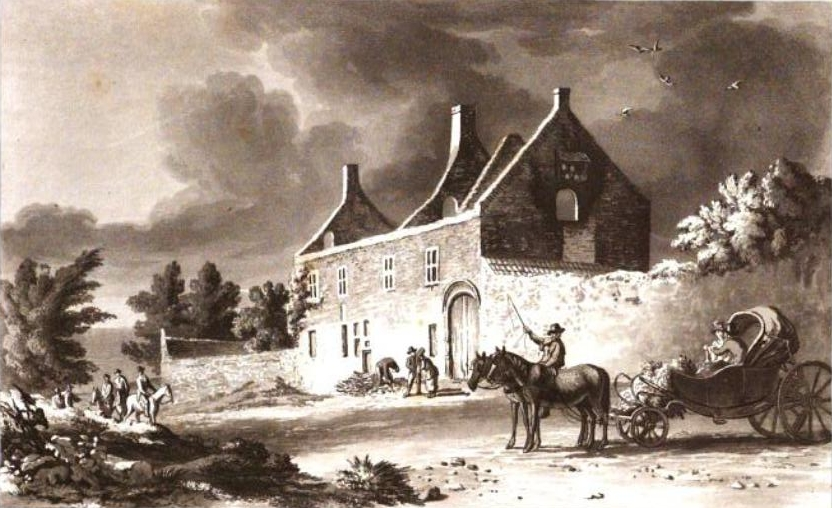
The burnt out shell of the house sketched by Robert Hills (1816)

In 1815 the farmhouse belonged to Séance de Caioux. (Note: Robert Hills notes "The French official details say, that the Emperor's" head quarters were at the farm of Oaillon, near Planchenoit. Caioux was its name, as written for me by a farmer near the spot" (Hills 1816, p. 93).) Napoleon resided there on the night of the 17/18 of June 1815. It is the site of the breakfast conference at which Napoleon told his marshals, "Wellington is a bad general, the English are bad troops, and this affair is nothing more than eating breakfast".

A day after the battle, the Prussians, vowing that it should never again harbour their former enemy, burnt the farmhouse.

== Museum ==
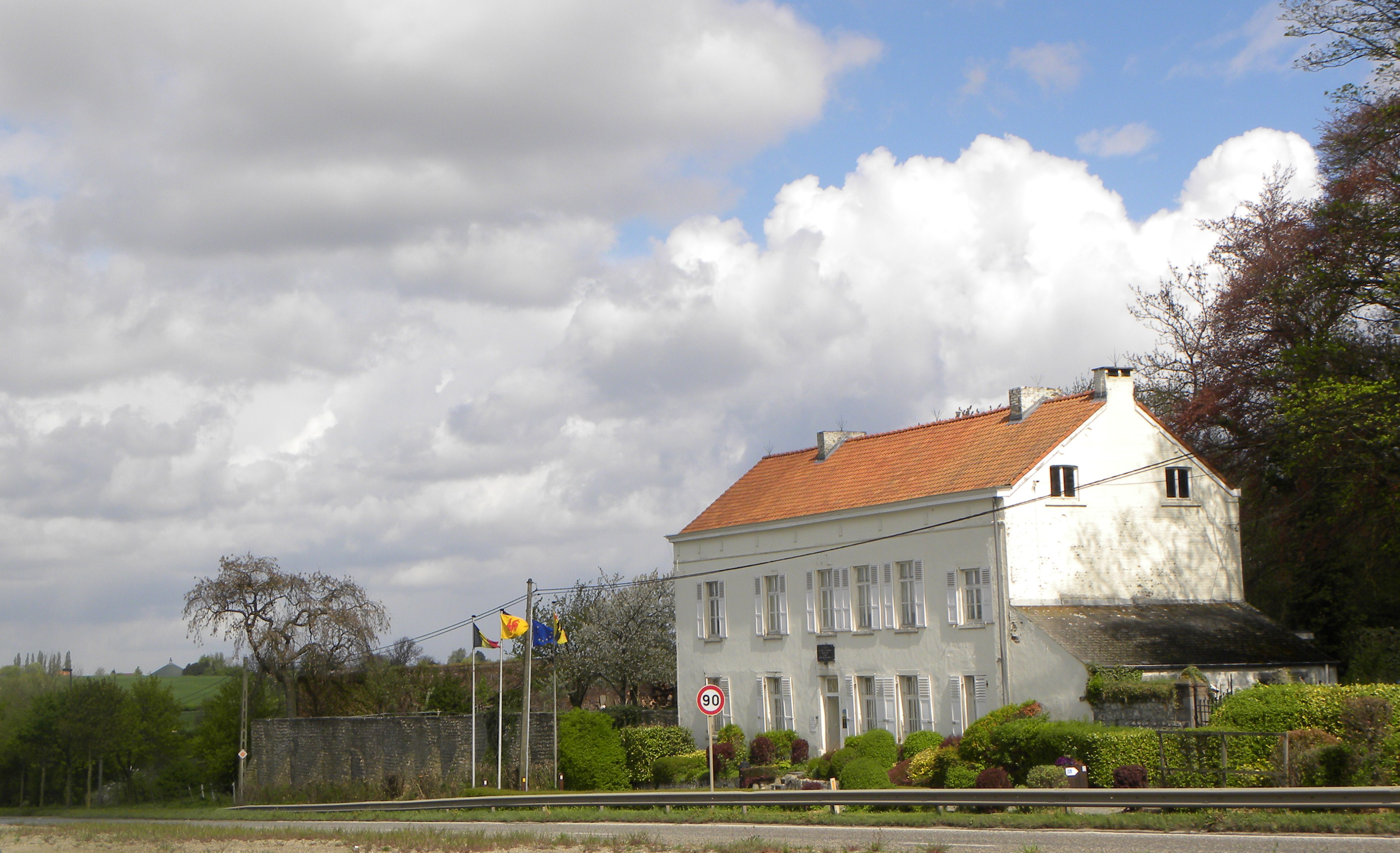
The house in 2011 photographed from a similar position to the sketch in 1816. The Lion Mound is visible on the horizon to left of the building.

The museum houses unique pieces, such as the Emperor's camp bed and table he used during the campaign.

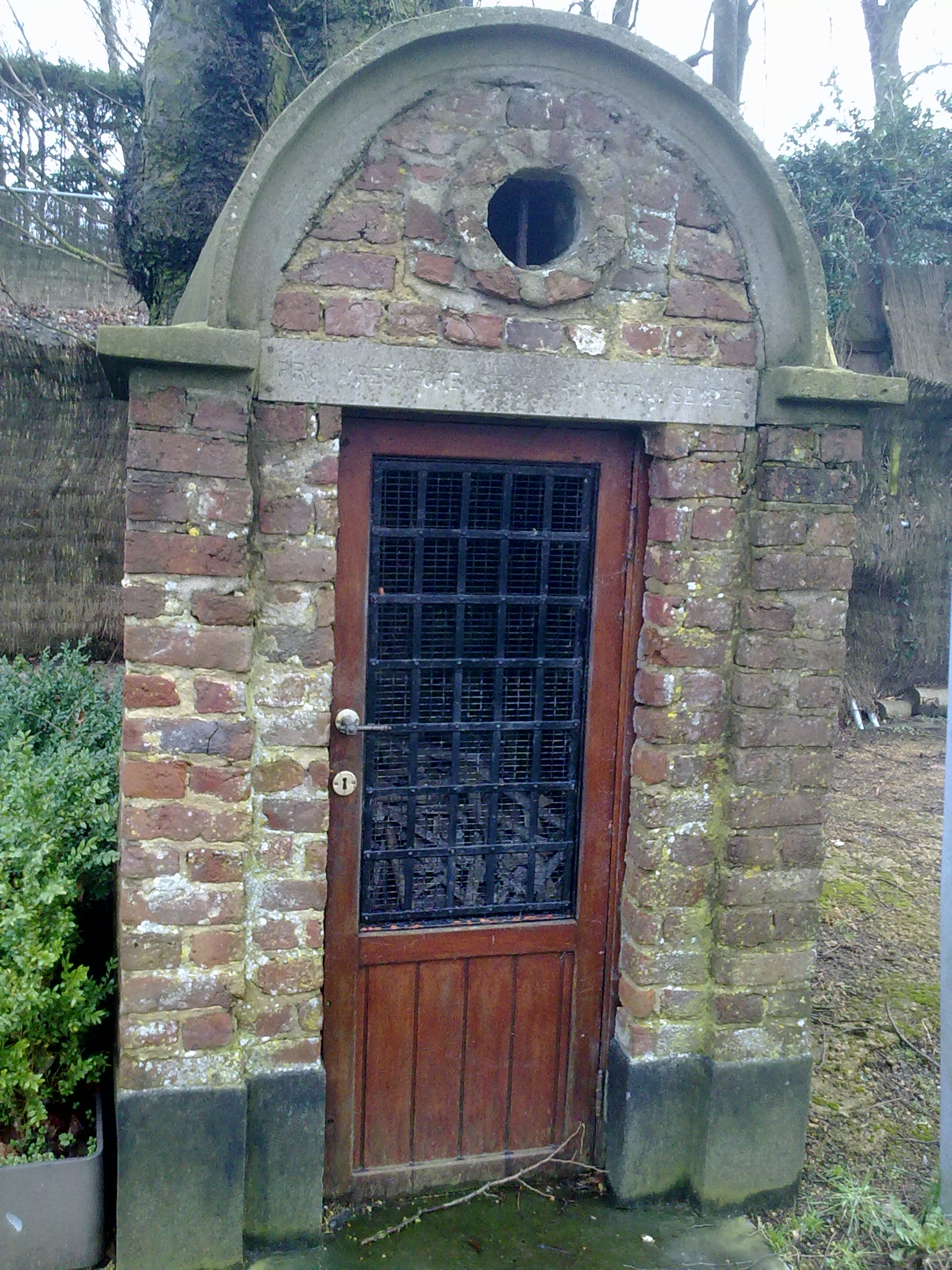
Ossuary built in 1912 in the garden to house bones found in the surrounding fields

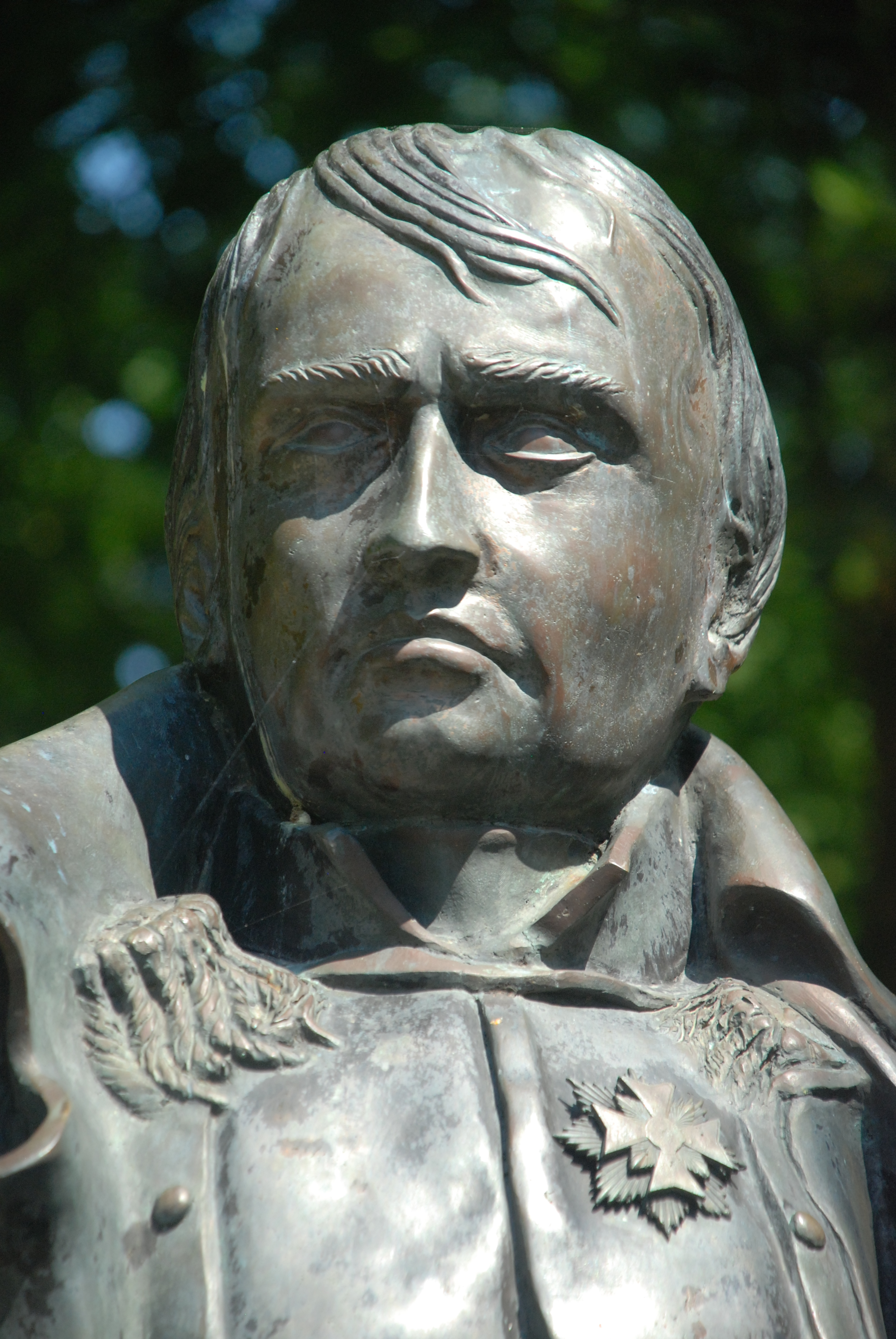
Bust of Napoleon by made by Luigi di Quintana Bellini Trinchi in 2002
