= List of protected heritage sites in Lasne =

This table shows an overview of the protected heritage sites in the Walloon town Lasne. This list is part of Belgium's national heritage.

Object	Year/architect	Town/section	Address	Coordinates	Number^{?}	Image
Gros Tilleul, a large lime tree ^{(nl)} ^{(fr)}		Lasne	place de Renival, te Lasne-Chapelle-Saint-Lambert	50.681861°N 4.491968°E	25119-CLT-0002-01 Info	
Abbey of Aywiers and surrounding area ^{(nl)} ^{(fr)}		Lasne	Couture-Saint-Germain	50.668828°N 4.464309°E	25119-CLT-0003-01 Info	Abdij van Aywiers en de omliggende terreinen
Old vicarage of Maransart, wall and gate and the ensemble formed by the parsonage and garden ^{(nl)} ^{(fr)}		Lasne	Lasne	50.660577°N 4.460664°E	25119-CLT-0004-01 Info	
Tower of the Church of Saint-Etienne ^{(nl)} ^{(fr)}		Lasne	Ohain	50.694483°N 4.469577°E	25119-CLT-0007-01 Info	Toren van de kerk Saint-Etienne
Ensemble of the church of Saint-Etienne and its immediate surroundings ^{(nl)} ^{(fr)}		Lasne	Ohain	50.694555°N 4.469146°E	25119-CLT-0008-01 Info	Ensemble van de kerk Saint-Etienne en diens directe omgeving
Totality of the church of Saint-Etienne, whose tower is classified as a monument by Royal Decree of 21 December 1936 and the site by the Royal Decree of 30 March 1962 ^{(nl)} ^{(fr)}		Lasne	Lasne	50.694482°N 4.469712°E	25119-CLT-0009-01 Info	
Ensemble of the village / town square ^{(nl)} ^{(fr)}		Lasne	Ohain	50.697203°N 4.470694°E	25119-CLT-0010-01 Info	Ensemble van het dorps/stadsplein
the oak tree ^{(nl)} ^{(fr)}		Lasne	chemin du Moulin, Lasne	50.696373°N 4.477878°E	25119-CLT-0011-01 Info	
Farm "La Haie Sainte" ^{(nl)} ^{(fr)}		Lasne	Plancenoit	50.678001°N 4.411949°E	25119-CLT-0012-01 Info	
The stele, base, stairs and iron work of the monument of the Prussians and the ensemble formed by the monument and its surroundings ^{(nl)} ^{(fr)}		Lasne	Lasne	50.663802°N 4.428153°E	25119-CLT-0014-01 Info	De stele, de basis, trappen en ijzerwerk van het monument van de Pruisen en het ensemble dat wordt gevormd door het monument en zijn omgeving
Column Victor Hugo ^{(nl)} ^{(fr)}		Lasne	chaussée de Charleroi, Plancenoit	50.666656°N 4.413664°E	25119-CLT-0015-01 Info	Kolom Victor Hugo
Memorial of the French called L'Aigle blessé ^{(nl)} ^{(fr)}		Lasne	Lasne	50.666030°N 4.413358°E	25119-CLT-0016-01 Info	
Monument of the Hanoverans ^{(nl)} ^{(fr)}		Lasne	Lasne	50.679478°N 4.412451°E	25119-CLT-0017-01 Info	Monument van de Hanovriens
Memorial of the English, mémoire de Gordon ^{(nl)} ^{(fr)}		Lasne	Lasne	50.679671°N 4.411933°E	25119-CLT-0018-01 Info	Monument van de Engelsen, mémoire de Gordon
Right bank of the valley of Smohain ^{(nl)} ^{(fr)}		Lasne		50.690402°N 4.468634°E	25119-CLT-0019-01 Info	
Left bank of the valley of Smohain ^{(nl)} ^{(fr)}		Lasne	Lasne	50.698907°N 4.498788°E	25119-CLT-0020-01 Info	
Ransbeck square ^{(nl)} ^{(fr)}		Lasne	Ohain	50.702975°N 4.438913°E	25119-CLT-0022-01 Info	
Camp of the Battle of Waterloo in 1815 ^{(nl)} ^{(fr)}		Lasne		50.668009°N 4.389375°E	25119-CLT-0023-01 Info	
Camp of the Battle of Waterloo in 1815 ^{(nl)} ^{(fr)}		Lasne		50.668009°N 4.389375°E	25119-PEX-0001-01 Info	

== See also ==
- Lists of protected heritage sites in Walloon Brabant
- Lasne
