= List of protected heritage sites in Waterloo, Belgium =

Belgian heritage sites

This table shows an overview of the protected heritage sites in the Walloon town Waterloo, Belgium. This list is part of Belgium's national heritage.

Object	Year/architect	Town/section	Address	Coordinates	Number^{?}	Image
Camp of the battle of Waterloo in 1815 ^{(nl)} ^{(fr)}		Waterloo		50.668009°N 4.389375°E	25110-CLT-0001-01 Info	Kamp van de slag van Waterloo in 1815
Domed Temple at Saint Joseph Church ^{(nl)} ^{(fr)}		Waterloo	Waterloo	50.717529°N 4.397400°E	25110-CLT-0003-01 Info	Koepelvormige tempel bij kerk Saint-Joseph
The main building of the Wellington Museum and the ensemble formed by the building and its surroundings ^{(nl)} ^{(fr)}		Waterloo	Waterloo	50.717650°N 4.398242°E	25110-CLT-0004-01 Info	
Facade of the building adjacent to the Wellington Museum ^{(nl)} ^{(fr)}		Waterloo	chaussée de Bruxelles n°145 te Waterloo	50.717740°N 4.398226°E	25110-CLT-0005-01 Info	
Domain of Argenteuil ^{(nl)} ^{(fr)}		Waterloo		50.725129°N 4.423762°E	25110-CLT-0006-01 Info	
Some buildings of the provincial medical training institute ^{(nl)} ^{(fr)}		Waterloo	36, drève des Dix mètres, te Waterloo	50.721007°N 4.393171°E	25110-CLT-0008-01 Info	
Part of the farm of Mont-Saint-Jean ^{(nl)} ^{(fr)}		Waterloo	chaussée de Charleroi n°591 te Waterloo	50.686052°N 4.410161°E	25110-CLT-0010-01 Info	
Some parts of the music kiosk Queen Elisabeth: facades, roofs and emmarchement south of the building built according to plans of the architect Ywan Renchon and the concert hall, the dining room and inns and the entire park with the outbuildings built according to plans by Julius Renchon, the esplanade, the staircase, the water feature, sculpture, benches, walkways and plantings and wall ^{(nl)} ^{(fr)}		Waterloo		50.719005°N 4.415648°E	25110-CLT-0011-01 Info	Sommige delen van de muziekkapel Koningin Elisabeth: gevels, daken en emmarchement ten zuiden van het gebouw gebouwd volgens plannen van de architect Ywan Renchon en de concertzaal, de eetkamer en de pensions en de hele park met inbegrip van de bijgebouwen gebouwd volgens de plannen van Julius Renchon, de esplanade, de trap, de waterpartij, beeldhouwkunst, banken, wandelpaden en aanplant en muur
Ensemble of the Soignes forest and the Bois des Capucins in the territory of the municipalities Auderghem, Duisbourg, Hoeilaart, La Hulpe, Rhode-Saint Genèse, Tervuren, Uccle, Waterloo, Watermael Boitsfort and Woluwe-Saint-Pierre ^{(nl)} ^{(fr)}		Waterloo		50.729909°N 4.419371°E	25110-CLT-0012-01 Info	Ensemble van het Zoniënwoud en het Bois des Capucins, op het grondgebied van de sections Auderghem, Duisbourg, Hoeilaart, La Hulpe, Rhode Saint-Genèse, Tervuren, Uccle, Waterloo, Watermael-Boitsfort en Woluwé Saint-Pierre
Camp of the battle of Waterloo in 1815 ^{(nl)} ^{(fr)}		Waterloo		50.668009°N 4.389375°E	25110-PEX-0001-01 Info	Kamp van de slag van Waterloo in 1815
Soignes forest: area of special value ^{(nl)} ^{(fr)}		Waterloo		50.729909°N 4.419371°E	25110-PEX-0002-01 Info	

== See also ==
- Lists of protected heritage sites in Walloon Brabant
- Waterloo, Belgium
