= Plancenoit =

Village in Belgium

Coordinates: 50°39′38.38″N 4°25′46.24″E

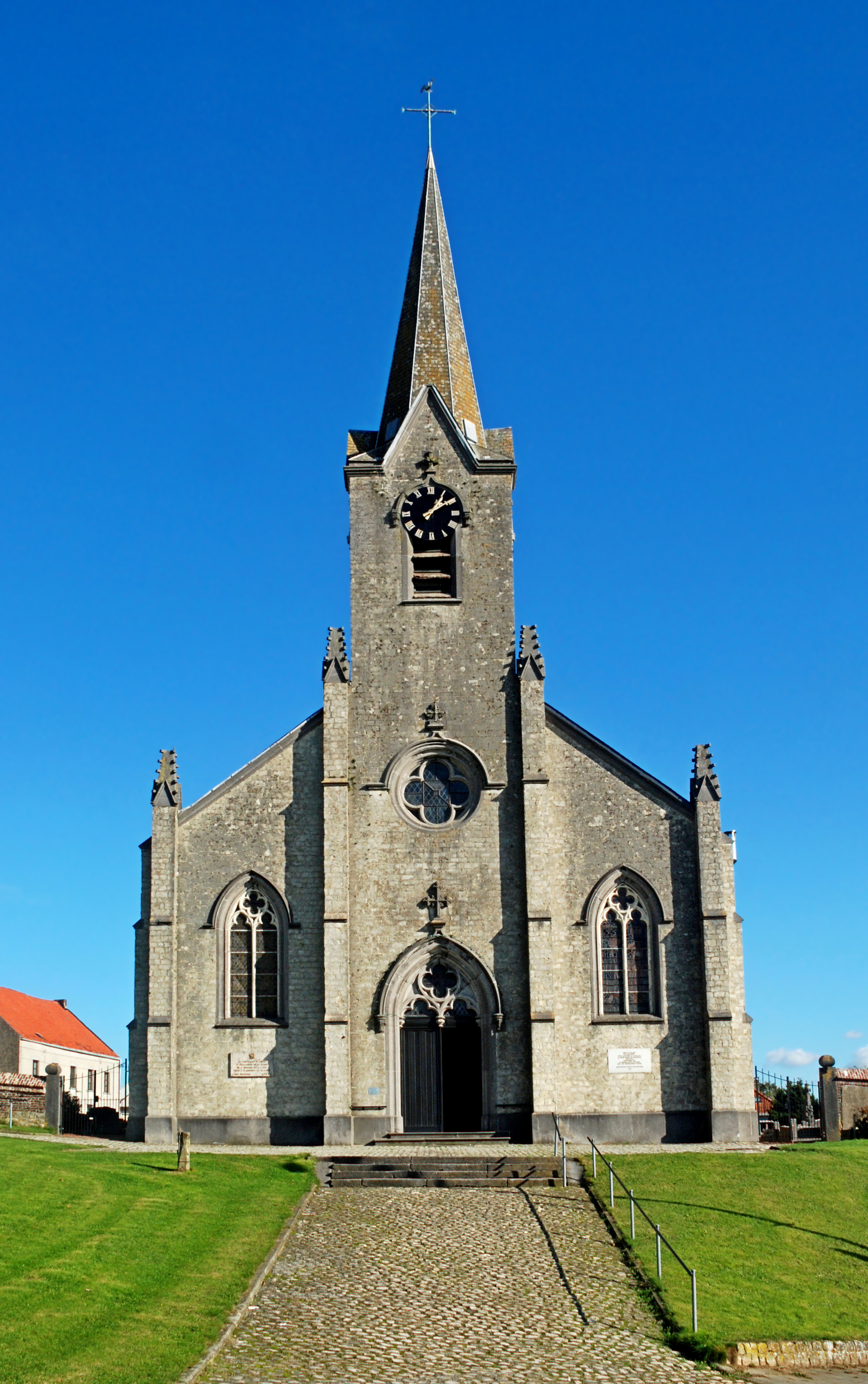
The Church in Plancenoit

Plancenoit (French pronunciation: [plɑ̃snwa]; Walloon: Planchenois) is a village of Wallonia and a district of the municipality of Lasne, located in the province of Walloon Brabant, Belgium.

The hamlet of Marache is on its territory.

The village was a key strategic point during the Battle of Waterloo as it was the main focal point of the Prussians' successful flank attack on Napoleon's army.

In June every year, the village plays host to an annual re-enactment of the battle. A monument in the village commemorates the Prussian troops who died in the battle.

== See also ==
- List of Waterloo Battlefield locations
