= Frischermont =

Belgian chateau

Coordinates: 50.67763°N 4.44490°E

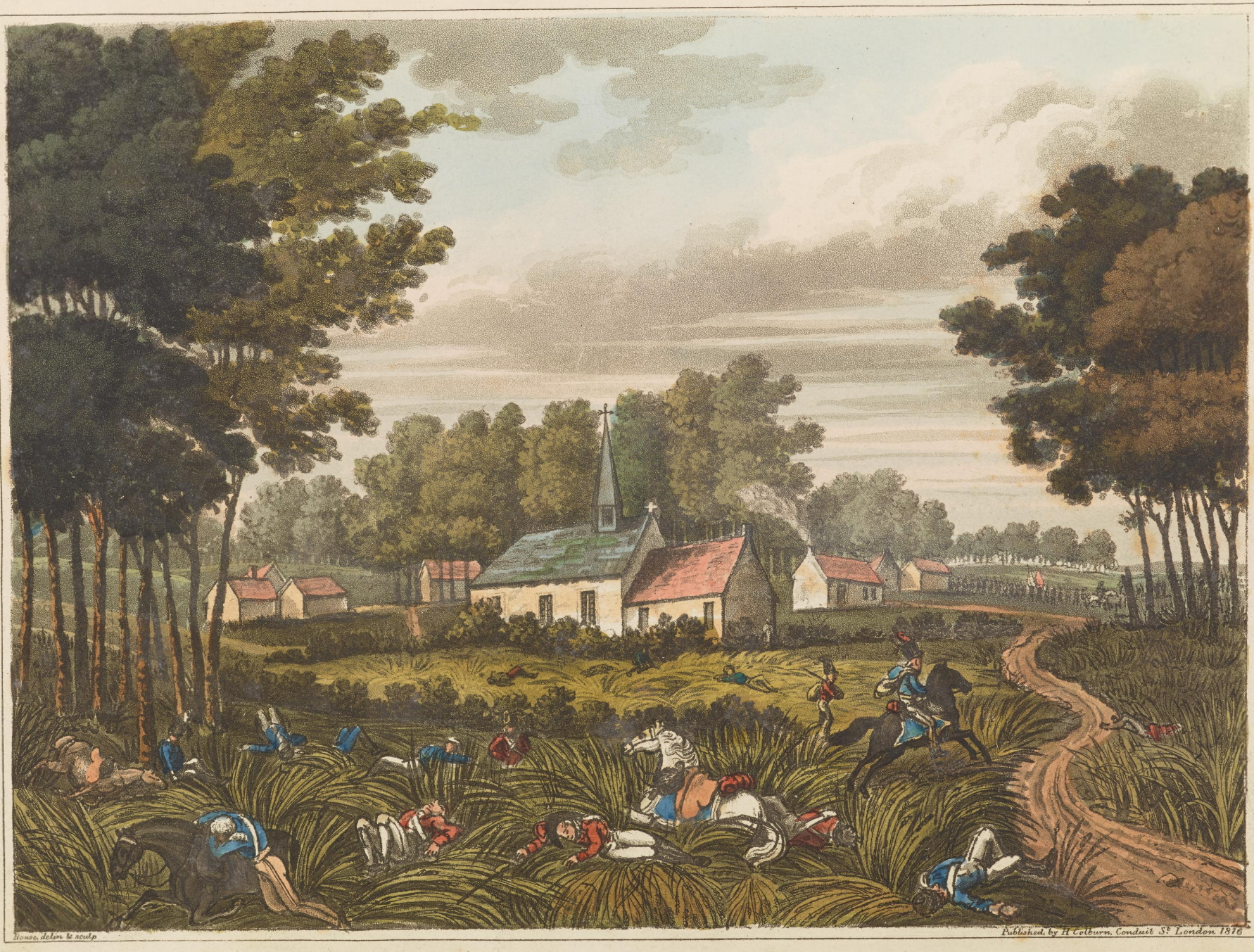
Frischermont Castle, shortly after the Battle of Waterloo.

Châteaux Frischermont or Fichermont in the Belgian municipality of Lasne is now a ruin (destroyed by fire in and demolished in 1965). At the start of the Battle of Waterloo in 1815 it was garrisoned by Dutch soldiers on the easternmost flank of Wellington's defensive line.

In 1705 the Châteaux was for a time the headquarters of the Duke of Marlborough. While at Frischermont, Marlborough wrote that the escarpment of Mont-Saint-Jean would be a good place to defend Brussels if it was attacked from the south.

At the start of the Battle of Waterloo on 18 June 1815 it belonged to Monsieur Beaulieu, and it was garrisoned by troops of the 28th Regiment, Orange-Nassau (Regiment Oranje-Nassau No. 28) under the command of Prince Bernhard of Saxe-Weimar. It was here at 10:30 that as a French patrol drove back Dutch pickets the first fighting of the day took place.

== See also ==
- List of Waterloo Battlefield locations
