= Papelotte =

Military stronghold at the Battle of Waterloo

Coordinates: 50°40′49″N 4°26′02″E

Papelotte Farm
- Chemin des Cosaques, Waterloo, Belgium
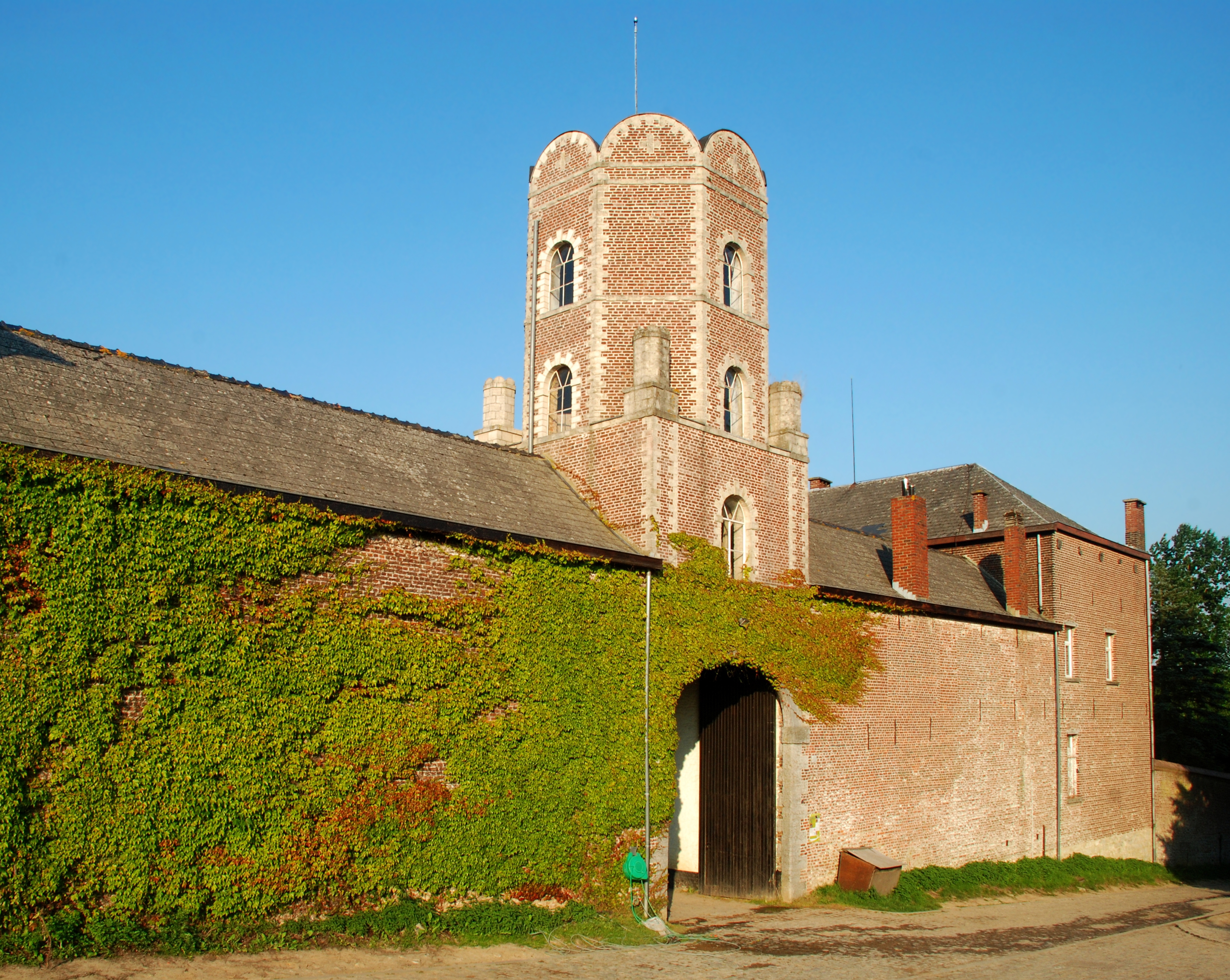
- The partly burnt down site was restored and new buildings were added after 1857.

Site information
- Owner: Private
- Condition: Reconstructed

Site history
- Battles/wars: Battle of Waterloo

Papelotte Farm (French: Ferme de la Papelotte, pronounced [fɛʁm də la paplɔt]) is located off Chemin des Cosaques, a rural road in the Municipality of Waterloo around 22 km (14 mi) south of Brussels, Belgium. On 18 June 1815, during the pivotal Battle of Waterloo it served as one of the advanced defensible positions of the Anglo-allied army under the command of the Duke of Wellington. Along with the walled farm compounds of Hougoumont and La Haye Sainte, (Note: Frischermont has been destroyed, Smohain was very isolated) it proved to be instrumental to the delay and the disruption of the opposing Napoleonic army's progress on the battlefield. Napoleon diverted disproportionately large numbers of troops in order to capture or eliminate these perimeters, while he failed to achieve a decisive break through in one of several attacks on the lines of the Allies.

Papelotte was situated on the center-left flank of Wellington's army. Napoleon would also lose valuable time and resources as he struggled with the Allied strongpoints, whose comparatively rather moderately sized garrisons defended with remarkable efficiency. Papelotte was manned by two Orange-Nassau regiments of the King's Dutch Brigade, from the Duchy of Nassau. German troops accounted for 45% of the personnel in the multi-ethnic Anglo-allied army. Around 6.15pm a contingent of the French Durutte division managed to enter and briefly occupy Papelotte Farm, as its garrison had run out of ammunition and retreated to a defensive line in the rear. However, the French troops could advance no further. They were tired, decimated, soaked by the previous night’s rain, covered with mud, demoralised by their previous lack of success and by the Prussian arrival and suspicious of their generals... Papelotte provided cover during the approach of Lieutenant-General von Zieten’s Prussian I Corps onto the Waterloo battlefield around 7.00pm. Around 30 minutes later Papelotte and La Haye Sainte were in Prussian hands as Durutte's forces had fully retreated without resistance.

Papelotte Farm was damaged and partly burnt down during the battle. From 1857 until far into the 20th century the site was restored, old buildings were replaced and new structures added, including the octagonal tower. Papelotte Farm is the home of the Poney club de la Papelotte.

Papelotte, gallery
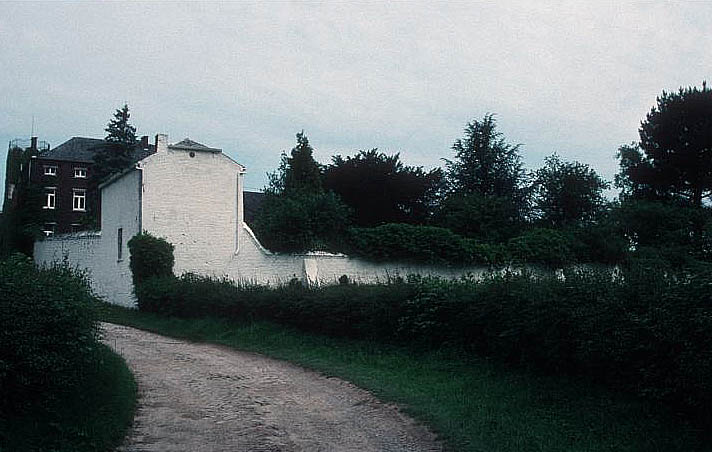
Papelotte viewed from the road

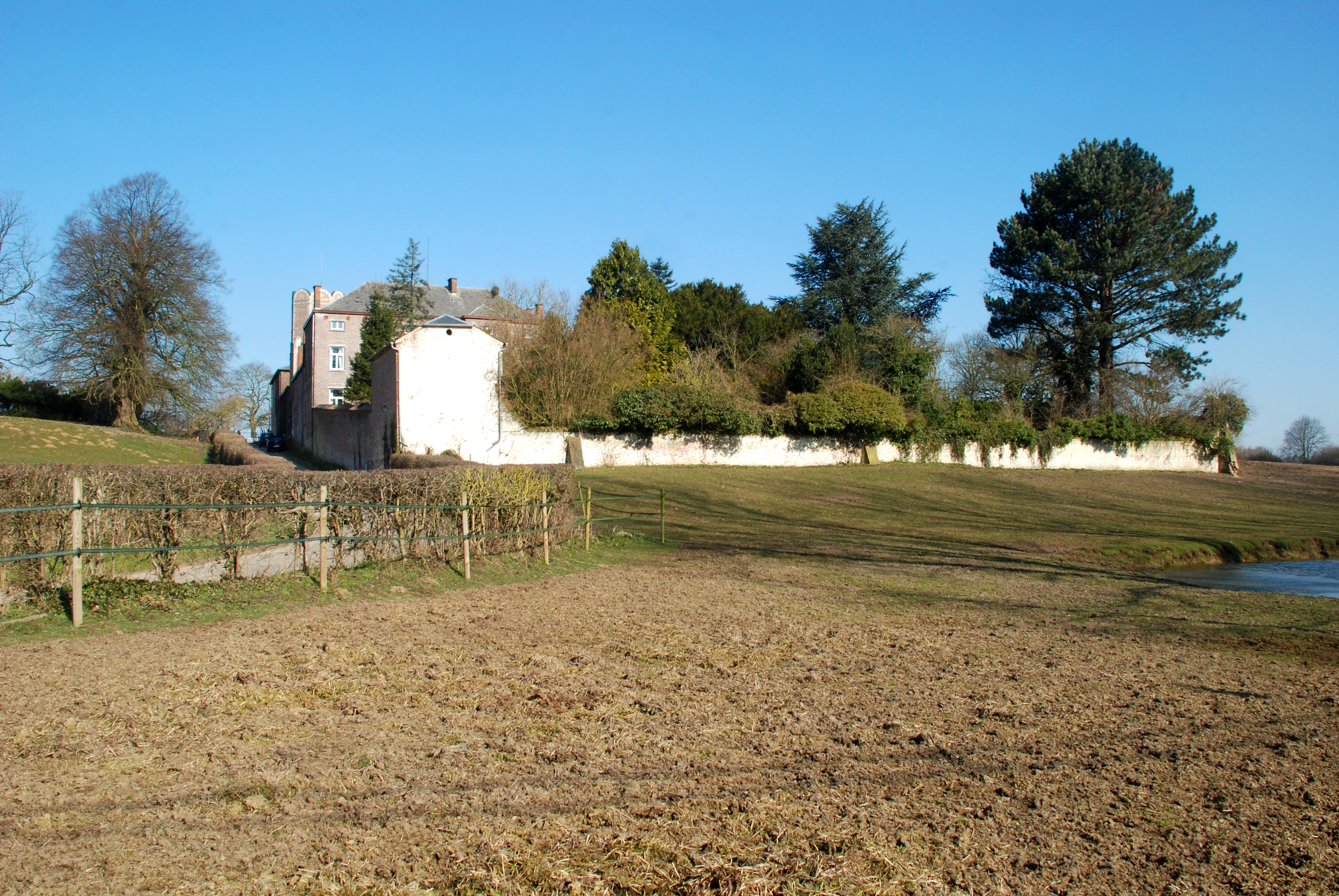
Papelotte viewed from the south

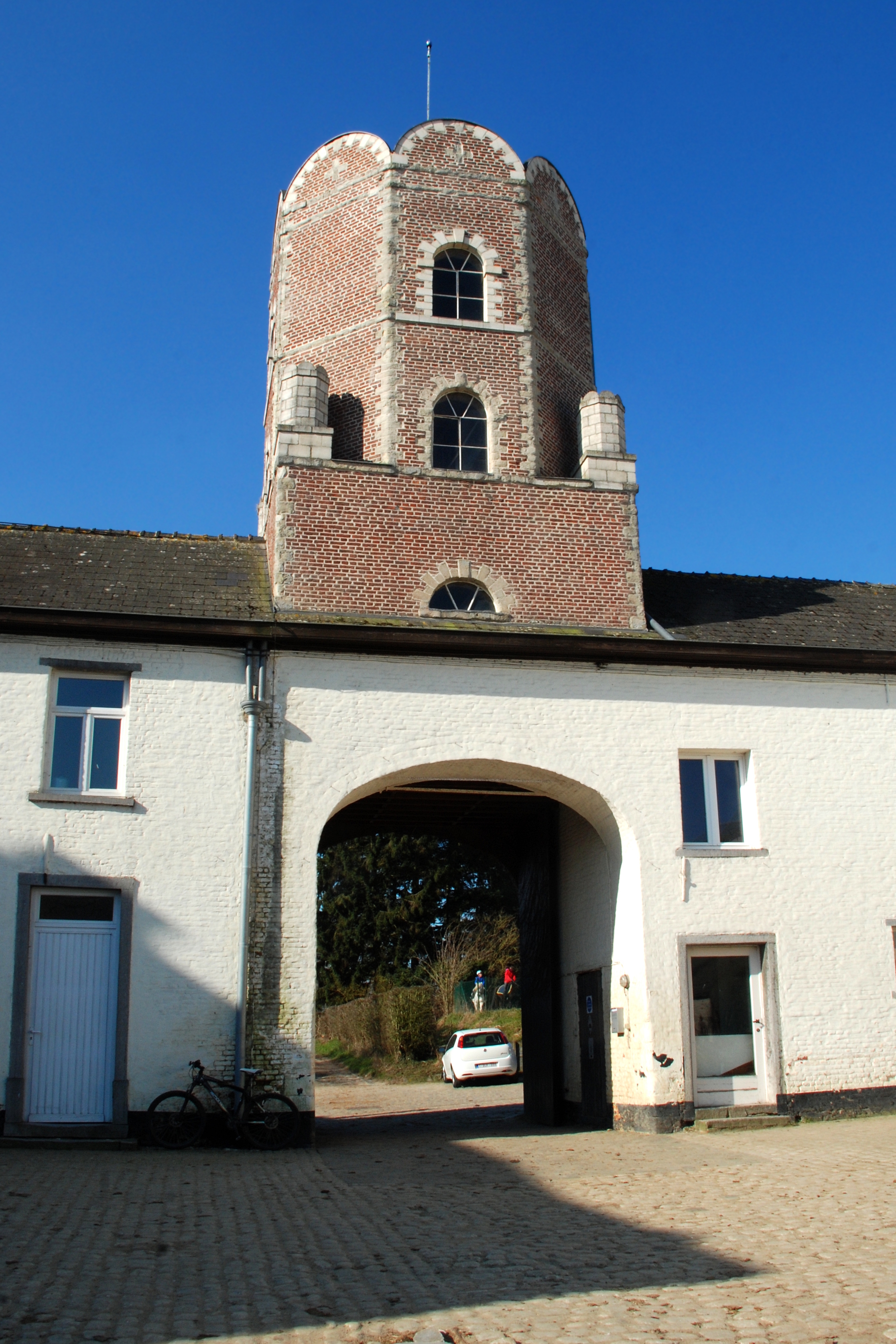
The porch and octagonal tower seen from the courtyard

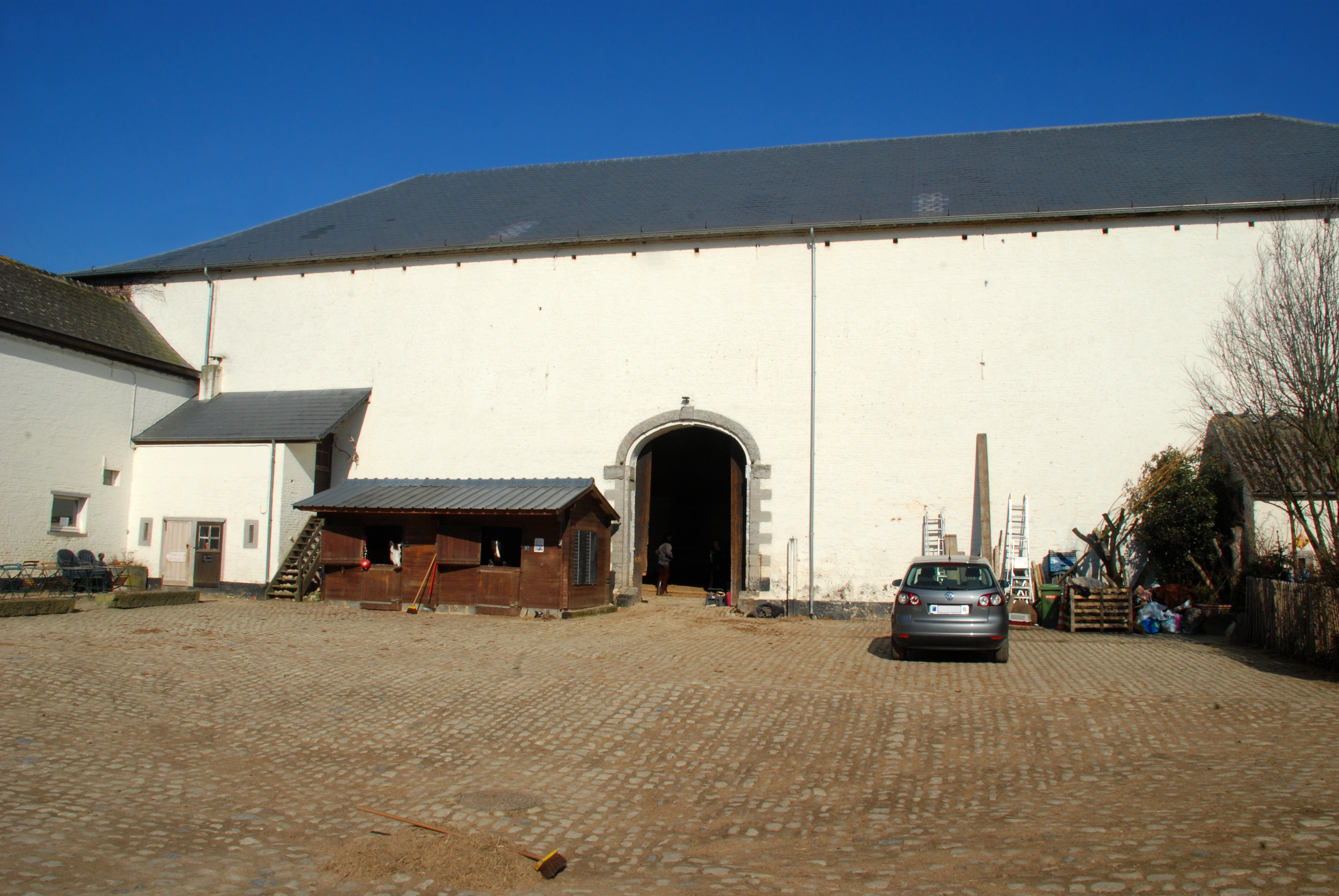
The barn

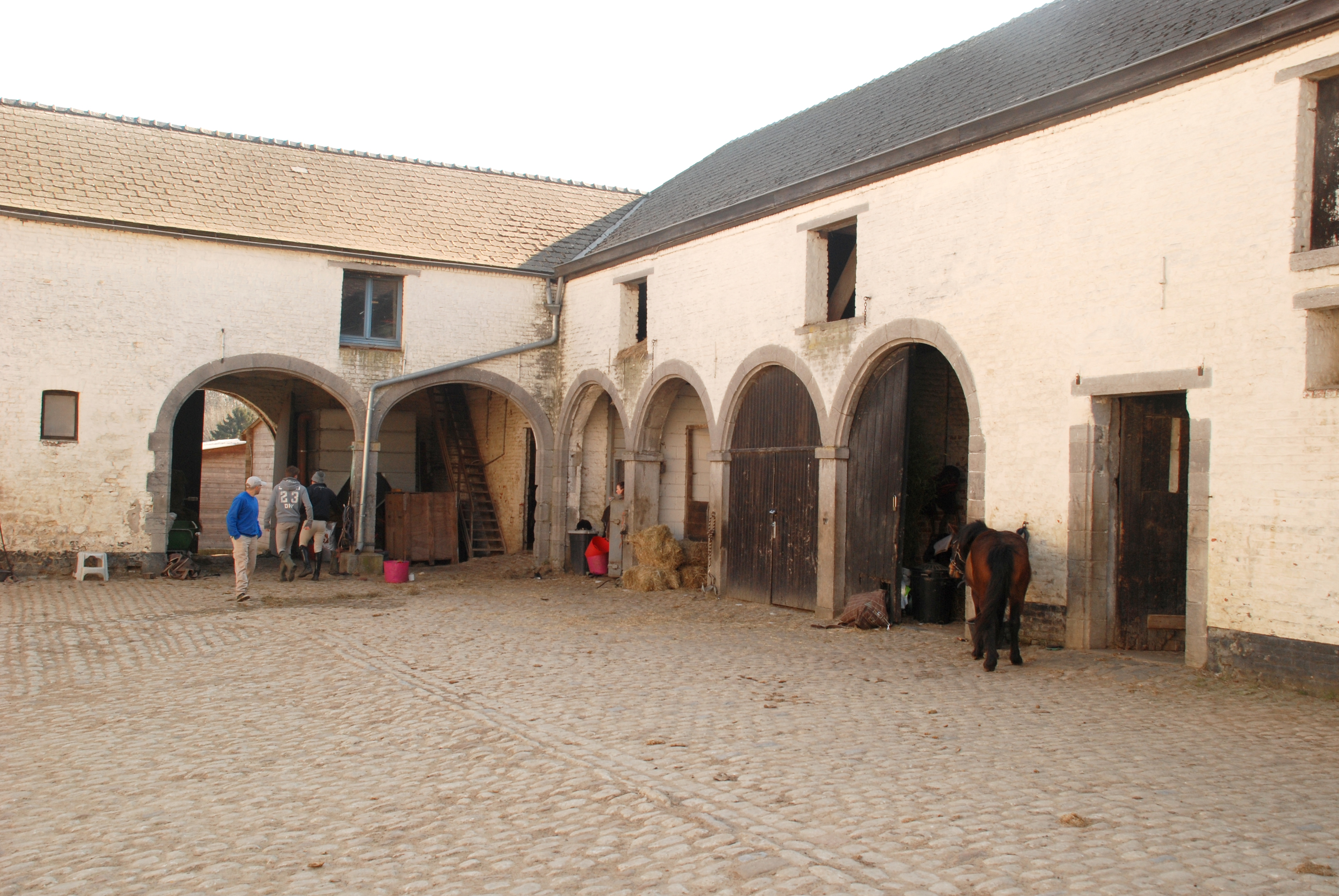
The garages with arched gates

== See also ==
- List of Waterloo Battlefield locations

== Notes ==
Footnotes
