= List of protected heritage sites in Braine-l'Alleud =

This table shows an overview of the protected heritage sites in the Walloon town Eigenbrakel, or Braine-l'Alleud. This list is part of Belgium's national heritage.

Object	Year/architect	Town/section	Address	Coordinates	Number^{?}	Image
Farm of Hougoumont ^{(nl)} ^{(fr)}		Braine-l'Alleud		50.670749°N 4.394492°E	25014-CLT-0001-01 Info	Boerderij van Hougoumont
Chapel of Ermite ^{(nl)} ^{(fr)}		Braine-l'Alleud		50.717338°N 4.349209°E	25014-CLT-0002-01 Info	Kapel van Ermite
Ensemble of the chapel of "Moûtier de l'Ermite" and its environment ^{(nl)} ^{(fr)}		Braine-l'Alleud		50.717720°N 4.347432°E	25014-CLT-0003-01 Info	
Site of the ponds of the seven fountains and surrounding areas located in the center of Braine ^{(nl)} ^{(fr)}		Braine-l'Alleud		50.717269°N 4.319822°E	25014-CLT-0004-01 Info	
Lion of Waterloo ^{(nl)} ^{(fr)}		Braine-l'Alleud		50.678848°N 4.404872°E	25014-CLT-0006-01 Info	Leeuw van Waterloo
Building ^{(nl)} ^{(fr)}		Braine-l'Alleud	rue des Jambes n° 37	50.682928°N 4.367531°E	25014-CLT-0008-01 Info	Gebouw
Empire Building at the corner of the place Abbe Renard and rue des Trois Apôtres ^{(nl)} ^{(fr)}		Braine-l'Alleud	place Abbé Renard 7 en rue des Trois Apôtres 1, 3, 5 en 7	50.682755°N 4.370651°E	25014-CLT-0009-01 Info	Gebouw Empire op de hoek van de place Abbé Renard en rue des Trois Apôtres
Facades and roofs of the old town hall ^{(nl)} ^{(fr)}		Braine-l'Alleud	Grand'Place 12-13, Braine-L'Alleud	50.682236°N 4.369522°E	25014-CLT-0013-01 Info	Gevels en daken van het oude raadhuis
Site of castle, abbey park, chapel of Saint-Sang, the farm and entrance building of the abbey Bois Seigneur-Isaac ^{(nl)} ^{(fr)}		Braine-l'Alleud		50.644952°N 4.317174°E	25014-CLT-0014-01 Info	Site van kasteel, abdijpark, kapel van Saint-Sang, de boerderij en entreegebouw van de abdij Bois Seigneur-Isaac
Chapel of Saint-Sang, the facade and roof of the castle Ophain-Bois-Seigneur-Isaac and the site classified by February 2, 1944 ^{(nl)} ^{(fr)}		Braine-l'Alleud		50.643843°N 4.322451°E	25014-CLT-0015-01 Info	Kapel van Saint-Sang, de gevel en de daken van kasteel van Ophain-Bois-Seigneur-Isaac en de site geclassificeerd per 2 februari 1944
Monastery chapel and the expansion of the ensemble of the castle and its surroundings ^{(nl)} ^{(fr)}		Braine-l'Alleud		50.646043°N 4.317195°E	25014-CLT-0016-01 Info	
The three facades that are not yet assigned in the castle of Bois-Seigneur-Isaac ^{(nl)} ^{(fr)}		Braine-l'Alleud		50.643144°N 4.323389°E	25014-CLT-0017-01 Info	De drie gevels die nog niet ingedeeld zijn van het kasteel van Bois-Seigneur-Isaac
St. Martin's Church ^{(nl)} ^{(fr)}		Braine-l'Alleud		50.638513°N 4.355827°E	25014-CLT-0020-01 Info	Kerk Saint-Martin
Water Castle ^{(nl)} ^{(fr)}		Braine-l'Alleud	avenue Alphonse Allard, te Saint-Sébastien	50.678536°N 4.380593°E	25014-CLT-0021-01 Info	Waterkasteel
Water Castle ^{(nl)} ^{(fr)}		Braine-l'Alleud	chaussée d'Alsemberg, te Ermite	50.710996°N 4.353326°E	25014-CLT-0022-01 Info	Waterkasteel
Church of Saint-Etienne ^{(nl)} ^{(fr)}		Braine-l'Alleud		50.682496°N 4.370816°E	25014-CLT-0023-01 Info	Kerk Saint-Etienne
Facades and roofs of all buildings of the farm "Tout Lui Faut", and the ensemble of the farm and surrounding area ^{(nl)} ^{(fr)}		Braine-l'Alleud		50.707043°N 4.342171°E	25014-CLT-0025-01 Info	
Organs of the church of Sainte Aldegonde ^{(nl)} ^{(fr)}		Braine-l'Alleud		50.666103°N 4.348577°E	25014-CLT-0026-01 Info	
Certain parts of the building at the foot of the Lion of Waterloo called "Panorama de la Bataille de Waterloo" ^{(nl)} ^{(fr)}		Braine-l'Alleud		50.679320°N 4.404818°E	25014-CLT-0027-01 Info	
Part of the old abbey of Nizelles ^{(nl)} ^{(fr)}		Braine-l'Alleud		50.666333°N 4.314271°E	25014-CLT-0029-01 Info	
Camp of the Battle of Waterloo ^{(nl)} ^{(fr)}		Braine-l'Alleud		50.668009°N 4.389375°E	25014-CLT-0030-01 Info	Kamp van de Slag bij Waterloo
Memorial to the English who died there at the memorial of Gordon ^{(nl)} ^{(fr)}		Braine-l'Alleud		50.679671°N 4.411933°E	25014-CLT-0031-01 Info	Monument van de Engelsen op het memorial van Gordon
The non-visible parts in the decree of 24 February 1998 regarding the building at the foot of the Lion of Waterloo, called "Panorama de la Bataille de Waterloo" ^{(nl)} ^{(fr)}		Braine-l'Alleud		50.679310°N 4.405256°E	25014-CLT-0034-01 Info	
The boundary stone known as the ‘de la Franche Garenne’ or ‘du Culot’ stone in Braine-l'Alleud		Braine-l'Alleud	Rue du Cuisinier	50.711010°N 4.347897°E	25014-CLT-0035-01 Info	
Mont-Saint-Pont Aqueduct (Monument) and establishment of a protection zone (Protection Zone)	1855	Braine-l'Alleud	Rue des Piles	50.702550°N 4.363041°E	25014-CLT-0036-01 Info	
The battlefield of Waterloo, part of which is already protected under the Act of 26 March 1914 (+ LASNE/Lasne-Chapelle-Saint-Lambert, Maransart, Ohain and Plancenoit and WATERLOO/Waterloo)		Braine-l'Alleud		50.674764°N 4.422473°E	25014-CLT-0042-01 Info	
Interior of the chapel of Saint-Sang and facades, roofs and tower of castle Ophain-Bois-Seigneur-Isaac ^{(nl)} ^{(fr)}		Braine-l'Alleud		50.643843°N 4.322451°E	25014-PEX-0001-01 Info	
Building called "Panorama de la Bataille de Waterloo" ^{(nl)} ^{(fr)}		Braine-l'Alleud		50.679320°N 4.404818°E	25014-PEX-0002-01 Info	Gebouw genaamd "Panorama de la Bataille de Waterloo"
Building called "Panorama de la Bataille de Waterloo" ^{(nl)} ^{(fr)}		Braine-l'Alleud		50.679310°N 4.405256°E	25014-PEX-0003-01 Info	
The camp of the Battle of Waterloo ^{(nl)} ^{(fr)}		Braine-l'Alleud		50.668009°N 4.389375°E	25014-PEX-0004-01 Info	

== See also ==
- Lists of protected heritage sites in Walloon Brabant
- Braine-l'Alleud
