= Waterloo Soldier =

Skeleton unearthed on the field of Waterloo

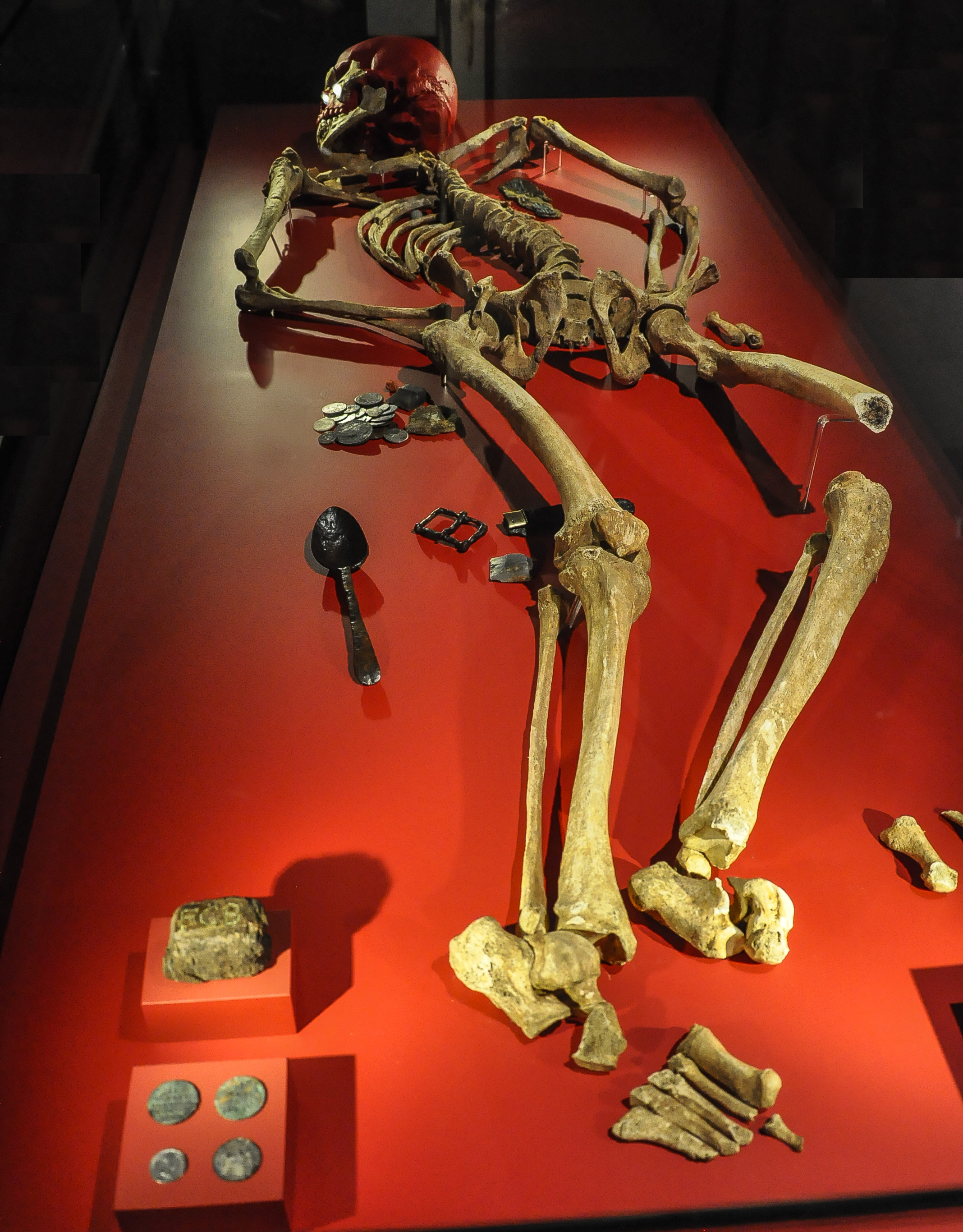
The Waterloo Soldier at the Memorial of Waterloo 1815

The Waterloo Soldier is the skeleton of a soldier who died during the Battle of Waterloo on 18 June 1815. The skeleton is kept at the Memorial of Waterloo 1815.

The remains were discovered in 2012 during archaeological excavations carried out on the construction site of a new car park created at the approach of the bicentenary of the battle in June 2015. It is believed the remains are those of a 23-year-old soldier from Hanover, fighting in the King's German Legion made of exiled Hanoverians who fought as part of the Duke of Wellington's army.

== Context ==
The discovery is unique, as no other skeletons have been found on the battlefield site so far: before this discovery, according to Dominique Bosquet of the archaeological service in the Walloon Brabant province, "A soldier's remains were discovered in 1912, but subsequent DNA tests on the bones showed it was made of two different people, so it was a fake".

Only very seldom do archaeologists discover a skeleton from the time of the Battle of Waterloo, let alone a complete skeleton. This is due to a practice that was widespread in the 1830s and 1840s: human bones were considered a great fertilizer for soil to grow crops, with the consequence that the area around Waterloo was intensively searched for skeletons of soldiers. Mass graves were plundered, their bones were ground into powder and sold to farmers. Historian John Sadler states that "Many who died that day in Waterloo were buried in shallow graves but their bodies were later disinterred and their skeletons taken. They were ground down and used as fertiliser and taken back home to be used on English crops.

Fertiliser companies raided other Napoleonic battlefields like Austerlitz and Leipzig, where the bones of fallen soldiers and horses were removed and shipped, usually to Hull, and on to bone-grinders, many in Doncaster.

This finally stopped in the 1860s after a Yorkshire newspaper ran a campaign criticizing the practice.

== Discovery of the skeleton ==
The skeleton was found on 5 June 2012 by the Archaeology Department of the Heritage Department of the Walloon Region. The Archaeology Department was conducting a preventive archaeological sounding campaign before the redevelopment work on the site related to the bicentenary of the Battle of Waterloo. They dug 120 sounding trenches, prior to the construction of the new 3-hectare (7.4-acre) car park planned as part of the developments. These 120 trenches represented 10% of the total surface area of the car park.

The skeleton lay in trench D39, located 500 metres (1,600 ft) northwest of the Lion's Mound. Here stood the Allied rearguard at about 7 am, four hours before the battle began. The site is located a few hundred metres from the Farm of Mont-Saint-Jean, which that day housed an English field hospital (the infirmary of the Duke of Wellington's army), and close to the troops of the Sovereign Principality of the United Netherlands, of the Electorate of Hanover (the King's German Legion) and of Brunswick

A lead bullet found in the ribs of the right side of the chest was most likely the cause of death and, from the beginning, suggested that the skeleton belonged to a soldier who died during the Battle of Waterloo.

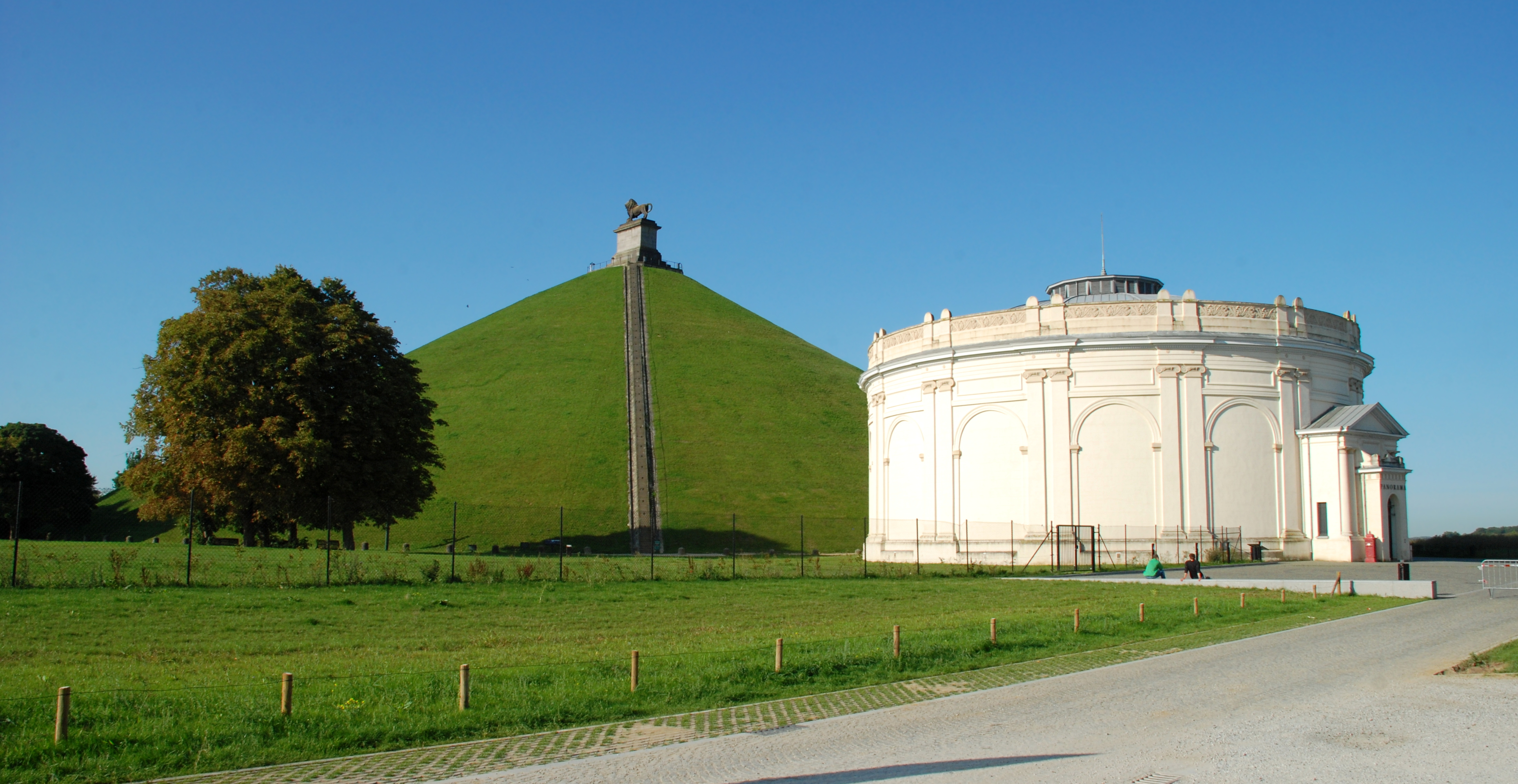
The Lion's Mound and the rotunda of the Panorama of the Battle of Waterloo, northwest of which the skeleton was discovered

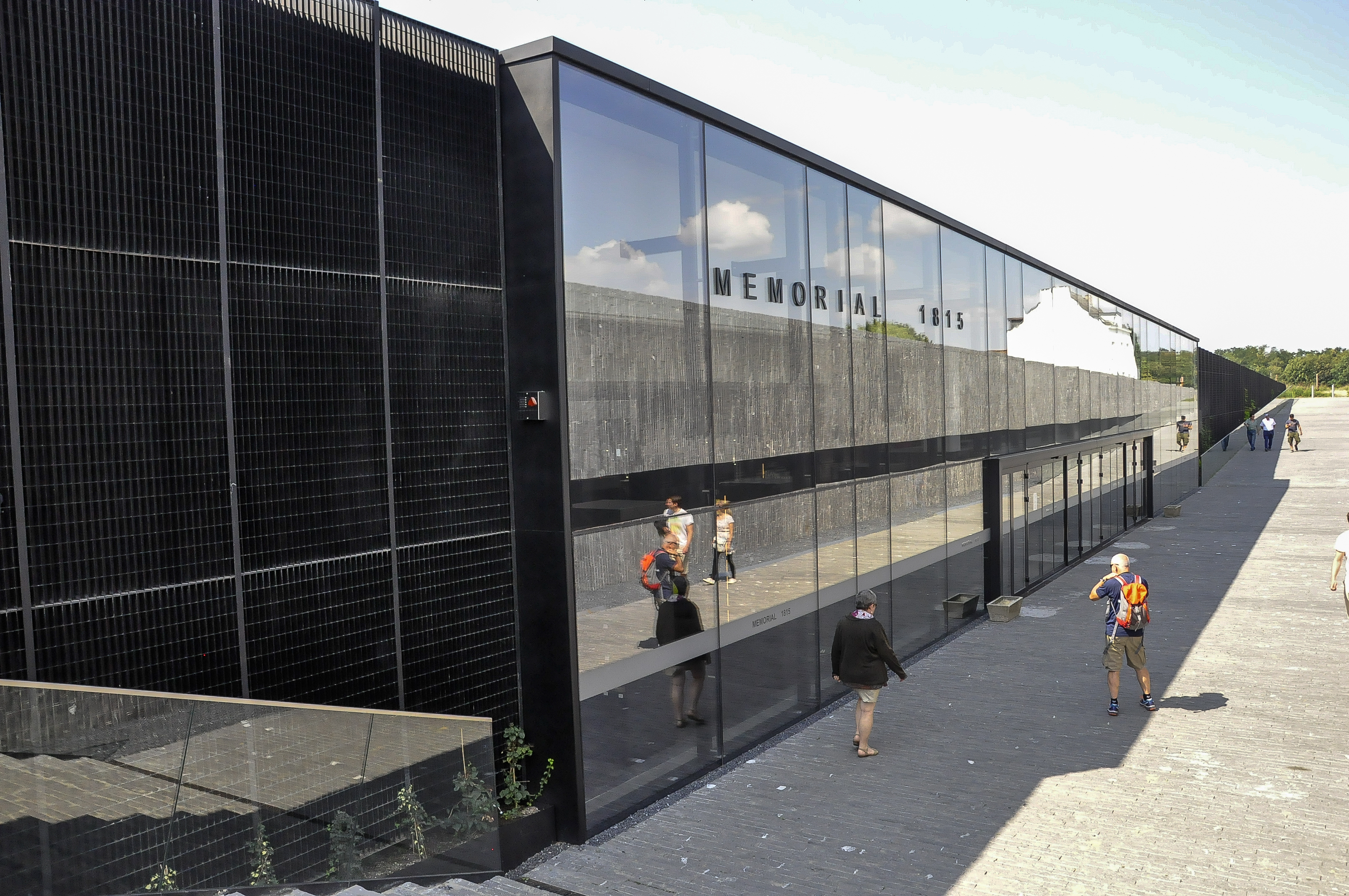
The Memorial of Waterloo 1815 where the skeleton is kept

== Examination of the skeleton ==
The remains, which according to the archaeological service of the province of Walloon Brabant escaped looting, were lying at a depth of 80 centimetres (31 in). Although a number of bones are missing, there is nothing to suggest that this is due to amputation or injury: the skull, knee and left foot were damaged by the excavator during the excavation, while the right foot and hands appear to have been previously displaced by the farm plows.

Anthropological and archaeological examinations showed that the man was most likely wearing pants and a shirt. The absence of metal buttons, on the other hand, indicates that the soldier was not wearing a uniform jacket when he was buried: it is possible that it was removed during the examination of his wounds. The fact that the corpse was only stripped of his military possessions (uniform jacket, weapons) while other objects were found near him seems to indicate that the man was buried in a hurry, as if one of his comrades had quickly buried him to protect him from the looters.

Examination of the pelvis indicates a male aged 23 to 25 years: this conclusion is supported by the observation of the sacrum which was not yet fully developed, indicating that growth was not complete. The dimensions of the femur of the individual indicate a height of approximately 161 centimetres (63 in).

The soldier was relatively frail and slightly hunchbacked, which would have rendered him not acceptable for military service in most modern armies.

One tooth is worn down, possibly from ripping open paper cones containing gunpowder.

== Objects ==
Several objects were found near the skeleton. They are of great interest for the reconstruction of the soldier's past.

=== Lead bullet ===
Just between the ribs, the scientists found a lead bullet with a diameter of 16.4 millimetres (0.65 in) and a weight of 23 grams (0.81 oz). There is no doubt that this projectile was fired from a French musket. This type of bullet was designed for the French musket of 1777. The British bullets had a larger calibre: they weighed 32 grams (1.1 oz) and had a diameter of 19 millimetres (0.75 in). It is also certain that the bullet was fatal and that the injured person was transported away from the frontline because he could not have done so on his own.

=== Piece of fabric ===
In the course of the examination, a piece of British-made fabric with a typical British weaving pattern was found. It is most likely a fragment of a uniform jacket or saddle pad.

=== Purse and coins ===
Near the pelvis, 28 coins were found, to which three pieces of cloth were glued. Glass beads were sewn onto two of the pieces of fabric. One of the coins came from Austria, while at least two coins were minted in the Electorate of Hanover. Eight coins were minted in Paris and one 12 French denier coin was produced in Lille in 1791–1792, i.e. during the French Revolution. One of the coins had been in circulation in the Principality of Brunswick for over a century.

=== Other objects ===
Other objects were discovered near the skeleton, such as two rifle flints, a small red pellet made of cinnabar (a mercury sulphide used as a pigment or in medicine), an iron spoon, a fragment of a wooden box bearing the letters "FCB" and the date "1792", an iron buckle and a pocketknife.

The two rifle flints correspond to the dimensions of the muskets of the British army, in which the Hanoverians were integrated.

The date "1792" could be the date of birth of the soldier, who died at the age of 23 in Waterloo, in accordance with the anthropological analysis mentioned above.

== Conclusions ==
=== Hanoverian nationality ===
Because of the foreign coins in his possession, the soldier would certainly have been neither French nor British. On the other hand, French currencies circulated among the troops of Hanover at the same time as the currencies of their own country and surrounding states, including Brunswick, so the coins found next to the corpse seem to indicate that the soldier fought under the flag of the Electorate of Hanover.

=== Hypothetical identity ===
The Welsh historian Gareth Glover, a Waterloo specialist, went further and advanced the identity of the deceased soldier by consulting archives: for him, it would be Friedrich Brandt, 23 years old, a soldier of the King's German Legion, a unit comprising primarily Hanoverians (Germans) loyal to the King of the United Kingdom of Great Britain and Ireland who also was the Elector of Hanover, George III.

Glover could only find three German soldiers with the initials "F B" (no middle initial being recorded in the records): the first fought on a different part of the battlefield to where the skeleton was found, the second is said to have died from his injuries near Brussels in August 1815, more than a month after the battle, so according to Glover there is only one candidate left: Friedrich Brandt.

"No-one can be 100% sure that the skeleton is Friedrich Brandt but with the information we have, this candidate is by far the most likely" says the historian. "From a purely scientific point of view, identifying this person will never be possible for me", Gareth Glover himself admitted: "it's one scenario out of a hundred".

== Controversy around the exhibition at the Memorial of Waterloo 1815 ==
The remains were put on show on 23 May 2015 at the Memorial of Waterloo 1815 in the Belgian province of Walloon Brabant. The decision to show the remains in a display box has shocked some British historians, like Tony Pollard who tweeted: "He was a soldier. He died in battle. He deserves a grave". Military historian Rob Schäfer said: "It doesn't have to be a military [funeral], just a dignified funeral. He can go home to Hanover … a burial in England would be great. Anything but being in a display box".

On the Belgian side, the institution insists the identity of the dead soldier is unknown, and the decision is justified as follows:

The issue of his presence at the Memorial was discussed within the design team, as well as among the various researchers who were looking at him. Ultimately, it seemed to everybody that the greatest homage that could be paid to him was to consider him, with the respect to which he is entitled and that the museum exhibit has sought to ensure, as the anonymous and silent representative of the men who perished that day in the same tragic circumstances [...].

The director of the Belgian Tourist Office for Brussels and Wallonia, said: "The purpose of the memorial was not to shock but to pay tribute" and she added that there was no financial motivation, as the memorial is a non-profit organisation.

Gareth Glover stresses that the skeleton:

remains unnamed as the Belgian archaeologists will not agree that the box was 'definitely' belonging to the skeleton; although they offer no explanation why it was placed in the ground with the individual burial if it wasn't his property [...].

== Sources ==
- Blenkinsop, Philip (15 June 2012). "Rare remains of soldier found at Waterloo". Reuters.
- Bosquet, Dominique; Yernaux, Geneviève; Fossion, Alain; Vanbrabant, Yves (2015a). Paquet, Pierre (ed.). Le soldat de Waterloo. Enquête archéologique au cœur du conflit [The Waterloo Soldier. An Archaeological Investigation at the Heart of the Conflict] (PDF) (in French) (1st ed.). Namur: Service public de Wallonie. ISBN 978-2-8056-0180-4.
- "Découverte du squelette d'un soldat tué à Waterloo". BFMTV (in French). 15 June 2012.
- "Le squelette d'un soldat trouvé à Waterloo". Cnews (in French). 12 June 2012.
- Dunn, James (5 April 2015). "Only full skeleton retrieved from Battle of Waterloo in 200 years identified by historian after being found under car park". The Independent.
- Byrne, Eugene (1 November 2013). "Were the pulverised bones of soldiers and horses who died at the battle of Waterloo sold as soil fertiliser?". History Extra.
- Crisp, James (17 July 2019). "Soldier archaeologists unearth musket balls and amputated leg bones at Battle of Waterloo field hospital site". The Telegraph.
- Ebsworth, David (29 April 2015). "Waterloo – Ten Things You (Almost Certainly) Didn't Know". David Ebsworth.
- "Bataille de Waterloo: le squelette retrouvé en 2012 serait celui d'un Allemand de 23 ans". DH (in French). 7 April 2015.
- Fritz, Jean-Paul (8 April 2015). "Un soldat de Waterloo identifié 200 ans après la bataille?". L'Obs (in French).
- Fowler, Simon (2006). Tracing Your Army Ancestors. Barnsley: Pen & Sword. ISBN 1-8441-5410-6. LCCN 2009396667. OCLC 1204323507. OL 8953455M.
- Glover, Gareth (2016). "Friedrich Brandt". Project Hougoumont.
- "Le soldat mort en 1815 découvert à Waterloo pourrait être anglais". La Libre (in French). 12 June 2012.
- Kelly, Mike (17 June 2015). "200th anniversary of the Battle of Waterloo - what happened to its heroes". Chronicle Live.
- Lambert, Maxime (9 April 2015). "Le mystère du squelette découvert sur le champ de Bataille de Waterloo enfin élucidé?". Maxisciences (in French).
- Lenfant, Pierre-Emmanuel (4 July 2012). "Belgique - Waterloo, retour sur la découverte d'un squelette d'un soldat mort en 1815". Archeologia.be (in French). Archived from the original on 22 March 2020.
- Paulet, Alicia (9 April 2015). "Le squelette de Waterloo dévoile son nom". Le Figaro culture (in French).
- "Le squelette d'un soldat retrouvé à Waterloo". Le Point culture (in French). 12 June 2012.
- "Waterloo: le squelette retrouvé en 2012 serait celui d'un Allemand de 23 ans". RTBF (in French). 6 April 2015.
- Sandhu, Serina (30 May 2015). "German soldier who died fighting for UK in Battle of Waterloo should be removed from museum display and given dignified funeral, say historians". The Independent.
- Sergent, Denis (14 June 2012). "Exhumation du corps d'un soldat à Waterloo". La Croix (in French).
- "Le soldat mort en 1815 découvert à Waterloo pourrait être anglais". Sudinfo (in French). 13 June 2012.
- Torfs, Michaël (11 April 2015). "Waterloo skeleton finally identified?". VRT.
- Vaillant, Frantz (18 June 2015). "Waterloo? Vous saviez que ..." TV5Monde (in French).
- Vervaeke, Leen (8 April 2015). "Skelet van Waterloo is mogelijk geïdentificeerd". De Volkskrant (in Dutch).
