= Waterloo 1815 Memorial =

Belgian museum complex at Waterloo, Belgium

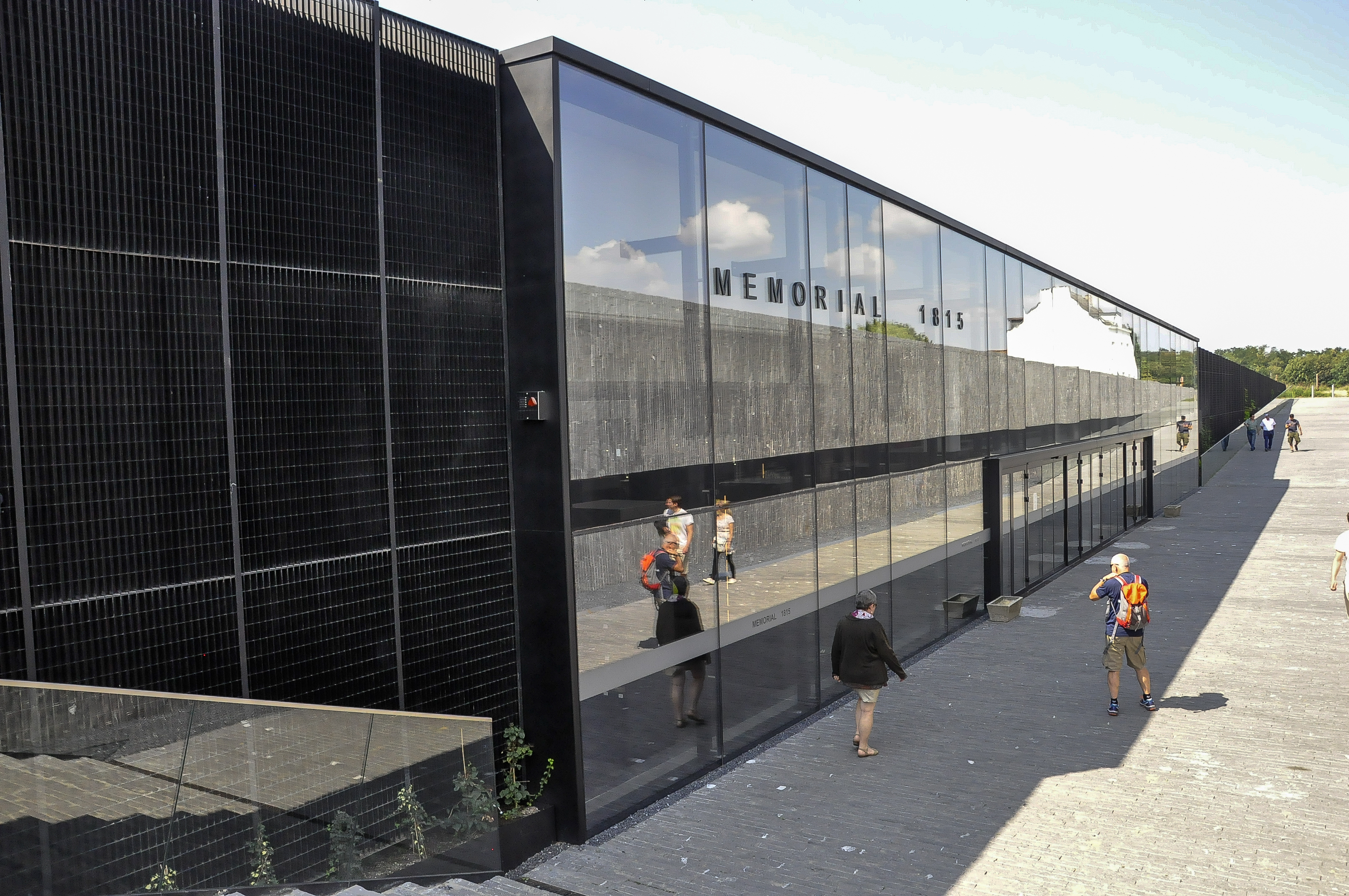

- Location within Belgium
- Established: 2015
- Location: Route du Lion, Braine-l'Alleud, Belgium
- Coordinates: 50.679816°N 4.404299°E
- Website: waterloo1815.be

The Waterloo 1815 Memorial (French: Mémorial Waterloo 1815) is a Belgian museum complex located on the site of the Waterloo battlefield in Belgium. It includes a museum inaugurated in 2015, the Lion's Mound, the Panorama of the Battle of Waterloo and the Hougoumont farm.

== Location ==
The Memorial, the Lion's Mound and the Panorama of the Battle of Waterloo stand on the northern edge of the Waterloo battlefield, along the Route du Lion (Lion's road), west of the chaussée de Charleroi, on the territory of Braine-l'Alleud, in the province of Walloon Brabant.

The Hougoumont farm stands to the south-west of the aforementioned complex, at the end of a path that starts from the Panorama rotunda, called the Chemin des Vertes Bornes, which takes further the name Chemin du Goumont.

The surrounding area is rich in monuments celebrating the battle, such as the Monument to the Belgians, the Monument to the Hanoverians, the Gordon Monument, the 8th Line Infantry Regiment Stele, the 27th (Inniskilling) Regiment of Foot Stele and the Picton Stele.

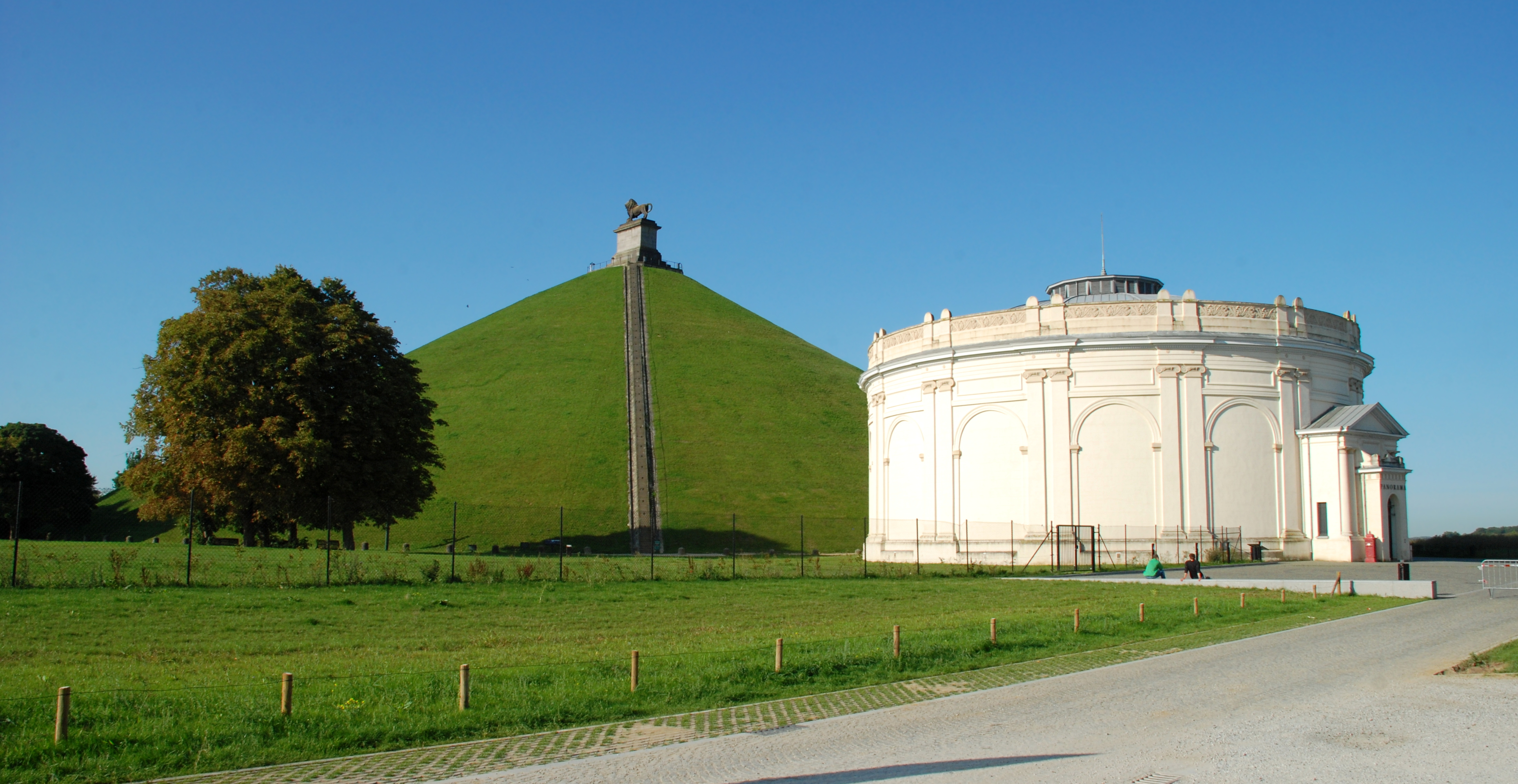
The Lion's Mound and the rotunda of the Panorama of the Battle of Waterloo.

== History ==
The site brings together four elements dating from very different periods:

- the Lion's Mound erected in 1826 at the request of William I, King of the Netherlands, who wished to commemorate the spot where his elder son, the Prince of Orange, is presumed to have been wounded on 18 June 1815;
- the Hougoumont farm, a forward position that protected the Allies’ right flank and was the scene of fierce and deadly fighting;
- the rotunda of the Panorama of the Battle of Waterloo, built in 1911 by architect Franz Van Ophem;
- a Memorial inaugurated on 21 May 2015, less than a month before the ceremonies of the Bicentennial of the Battle of Waterloo.

The Memorial was built in the run-up to the bicentenary of the Battle of Waterloo to replace the "outdated and uninteresting Visitor's Centre". Its construction was described by the press as a "rebirth after years of tired entertainment, poor restoration and neglected surroundings" which emphasised that "the Walloon Region has finally understood all the interest of this jewel in the middle of the fields". The old visitor's centre was demolished.

The construction of the memorial cost €40 million, financed by the Walloon Region, and its scenography alone cost almost €6 million.

The "Battle of Waterloo 1815" Intercommunal Association managed the site in its early days, but the Walloon Region and the Intercommunal Association decided to call on tourism professionals to take full advantage of the renovated facilities on the battlefield: a call for tenders was launched at the European level in 2018 and the contract was awarded to Kléber Rossillon, a private French company that already managed nine heritage and tourist sites in France, including the Musée de Montmartre, the Ardèche train, the Château de Castelnaud-la-Chapelle and the Chauvet Cave.

A concession contract was signed on 28 February 2019, entrusting the management of the memorial to the private operator from March 2019 until 2035. The contract provided for an annual fee of €365,000 to be divided between the Walloon Region and the Intercommunal Association, plus two variable fees linked to the concessionaire's turnover. Kléber Rossillon set itself the objective of reaching 300,000 paying visitors to the Memorial in 2021, the bicentenary year of Napoleon's death.

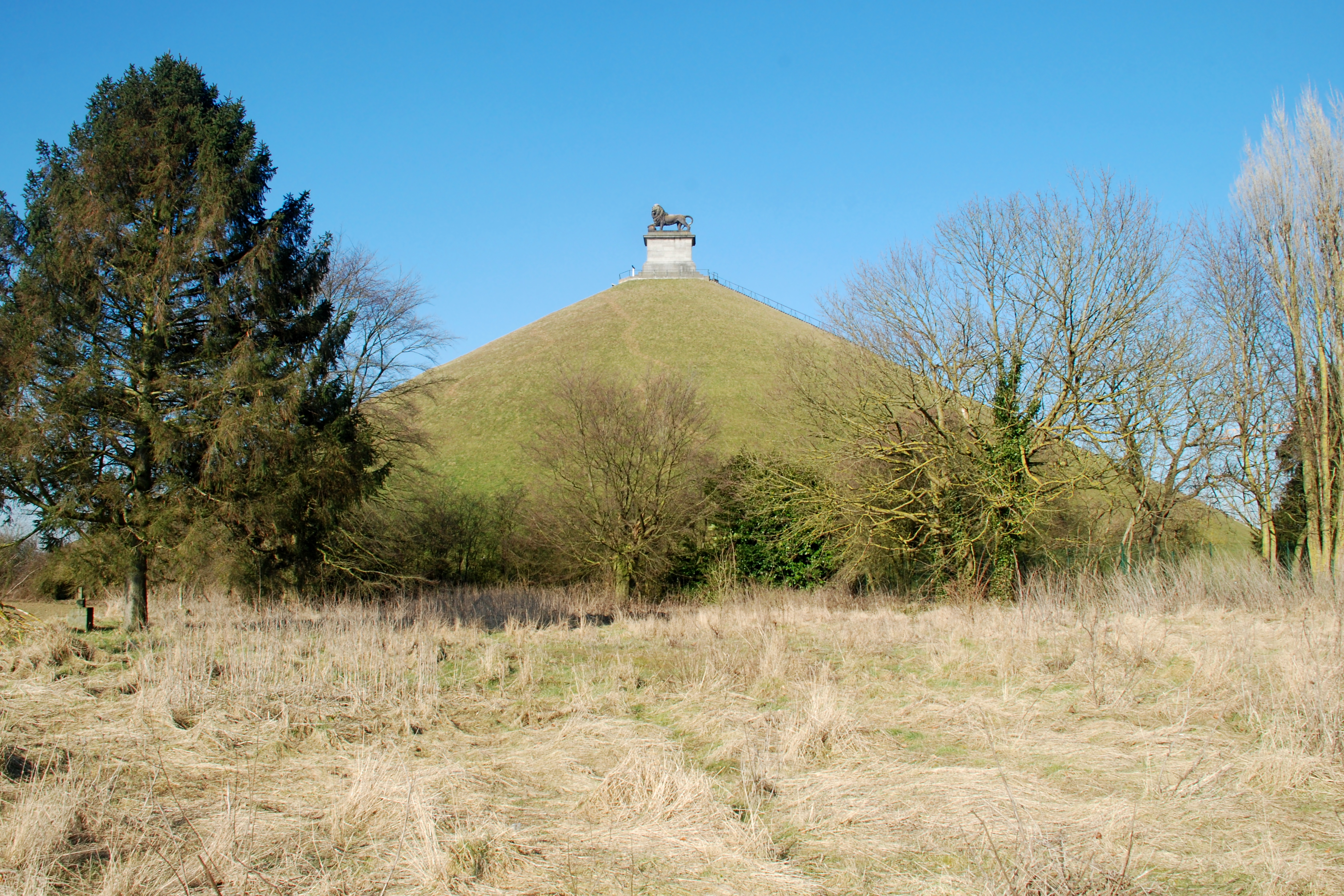
The Lion's Mound

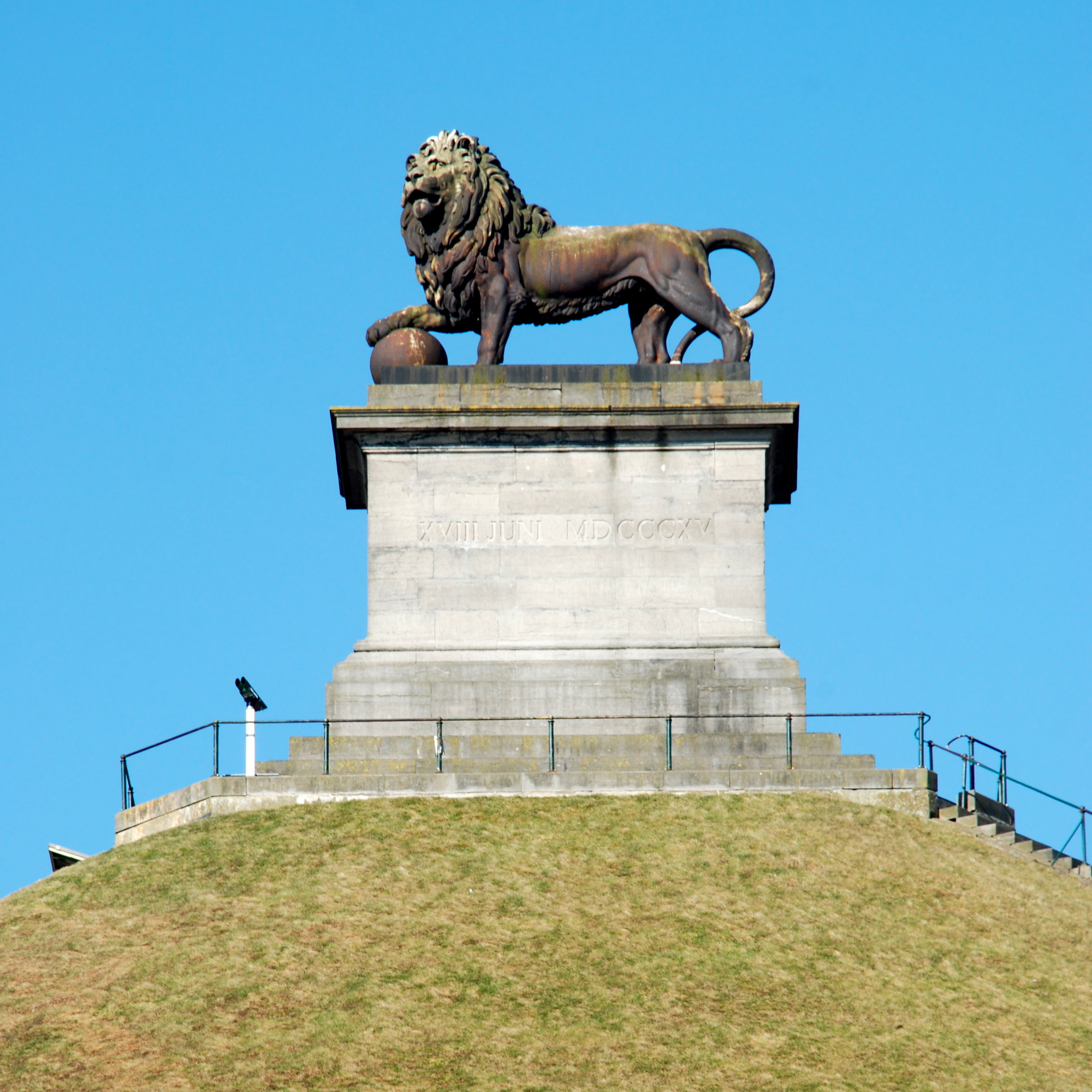
The Lion on top of the mound

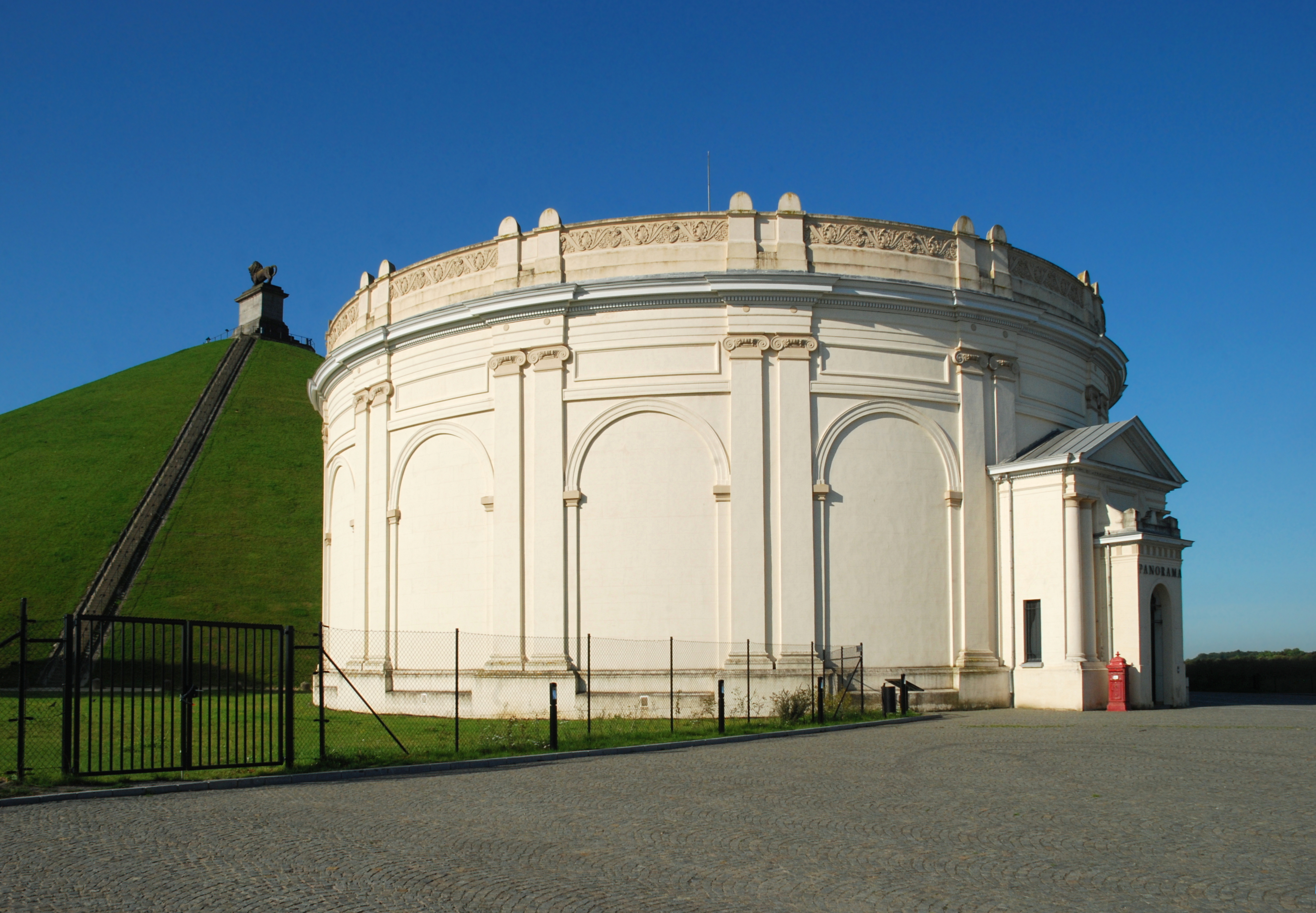
The rotunda of the Panorama

== Description ==
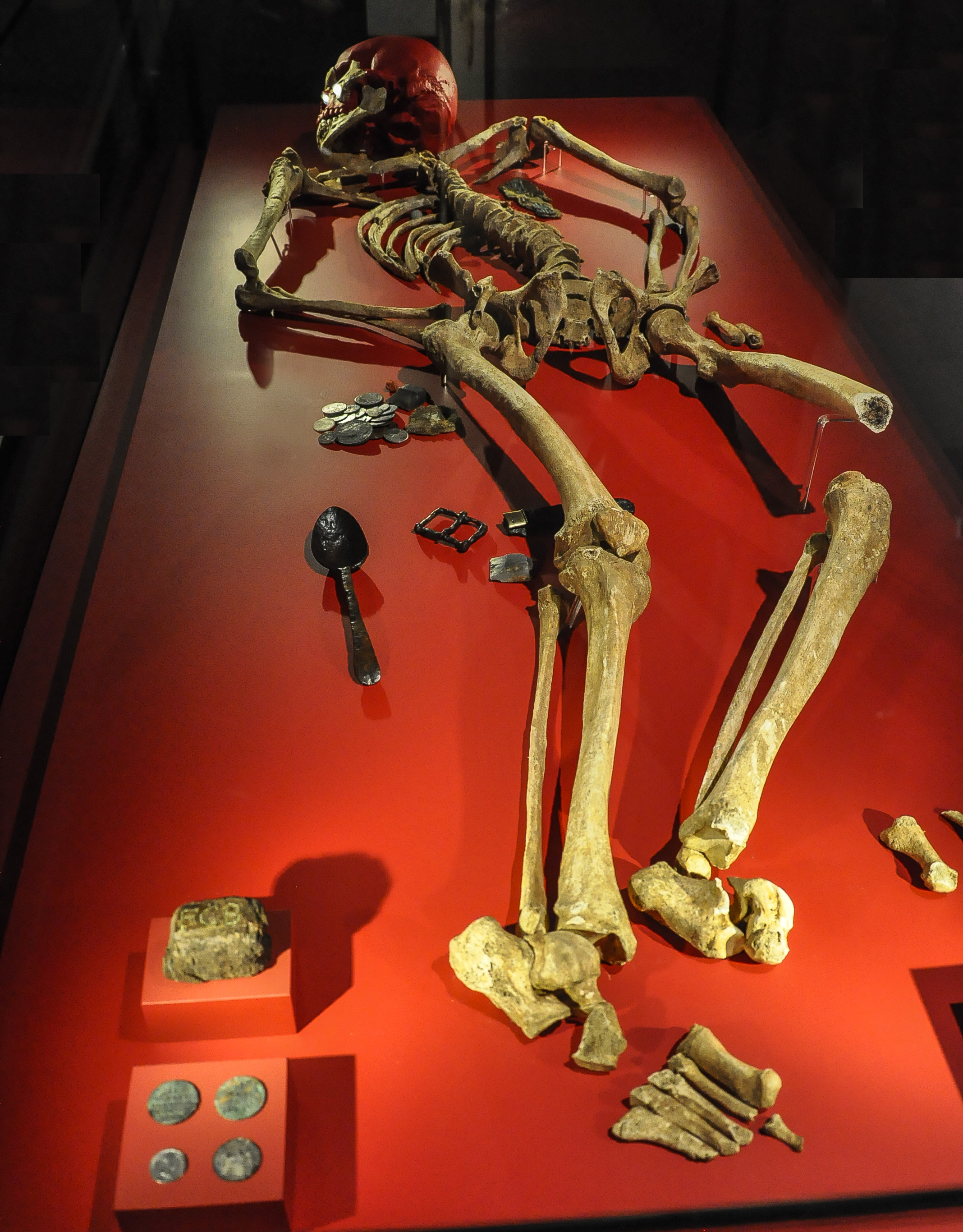
The Waterloo Soldier.

This memorial depicts the events of the famous battle that led to the defeat of Emperor Napoleon in 1815, and is a tribute to the 40,000 soldiers killed or wounded during the fights.

The memorial, with a surface area of 1,500 square metres (16,000 sq ft), allows the visitor to live the history of the battle through dioramas, uniforms, historical objects, animated maps, a movie projected on a 25-metre-wide (82 ft) 3D panoramic screen, a treasure hunt and multimedia animations.

It also presents the skeleton of the Waterloo Soldier, discovered in 2012 during an archaeological investigation on the site of a new parking lot, and which probably belonged to a Hanoverian who died during the battle.

The memorial gives access to the Lion's Mound – a 40-metre-high (130 ft) monument erected in 1826 at the request of William I, King of the Netherlands, to mark the presumed spot where his eldest son, the Prince of Orange, was wounded on 18 June 1815 – the rotunda of the Panorama of the Battle of Waterloo (built in 1911 by the architect Franz Van Ophem to house the gigantic canvas constituting the panorama of the battle was painted by the French painter Louis-Jules Dumoulin in 1912 for the celebration of the first centenary of the battle) and the Hougoumont farm (a fortified farm that was the scene of deadly fighting on 18 June 1815 and which hosts today a multimedia show).

Kléber Rossillon offers a host of activities to visitors: "the new activities will be immersive. With the installation of a bivouac at the foot of the hill. Small scenes will also be played throughout the day. A horse-drawn carriage will take visitors from the Memorial to the Hougoumont farm. There will also be horse demonstrations. Children are not forgotten. They are invited to try handling weapons and military marching."

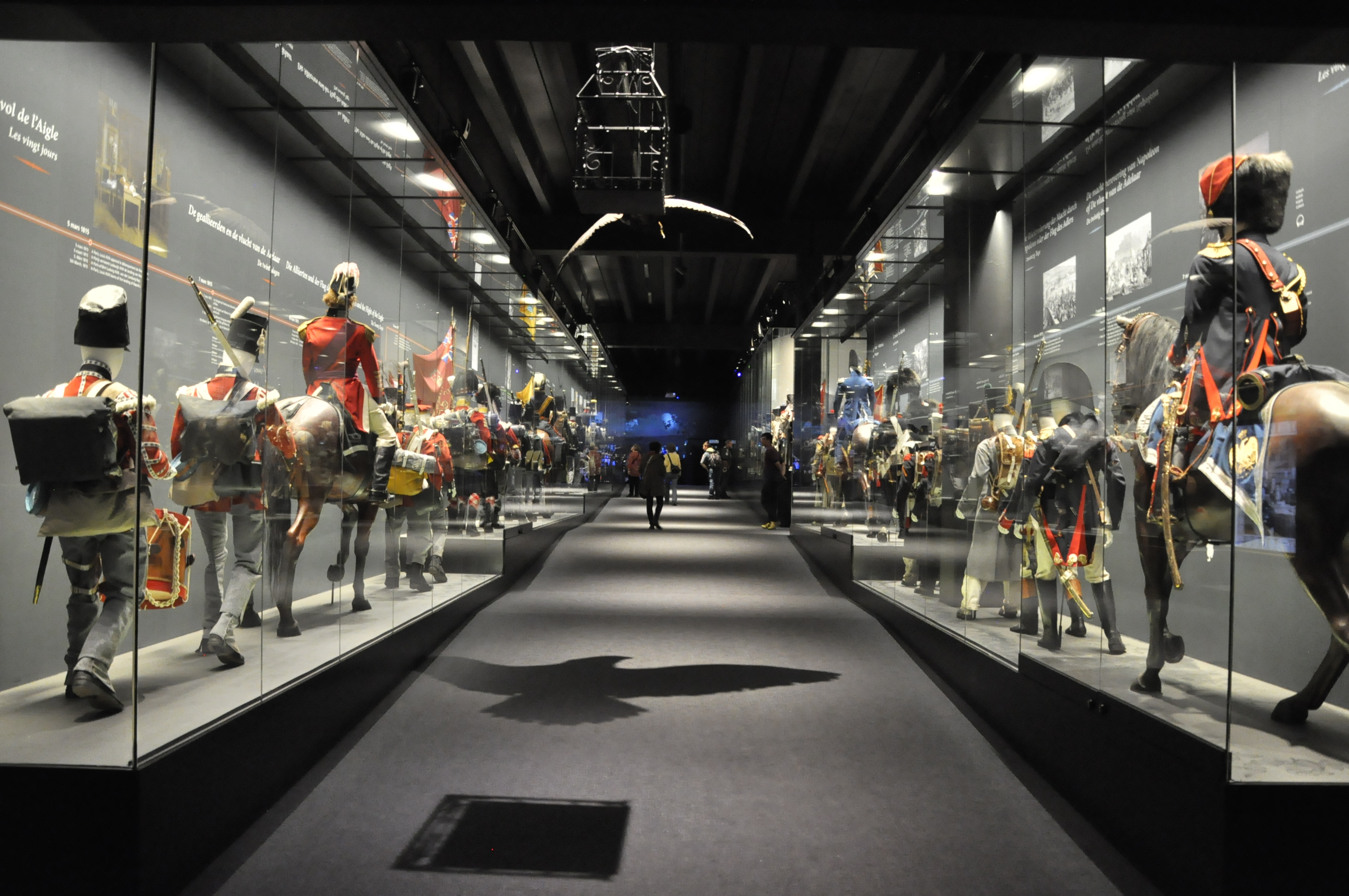
Dioramas with Allied troops on the left and French troops on the right

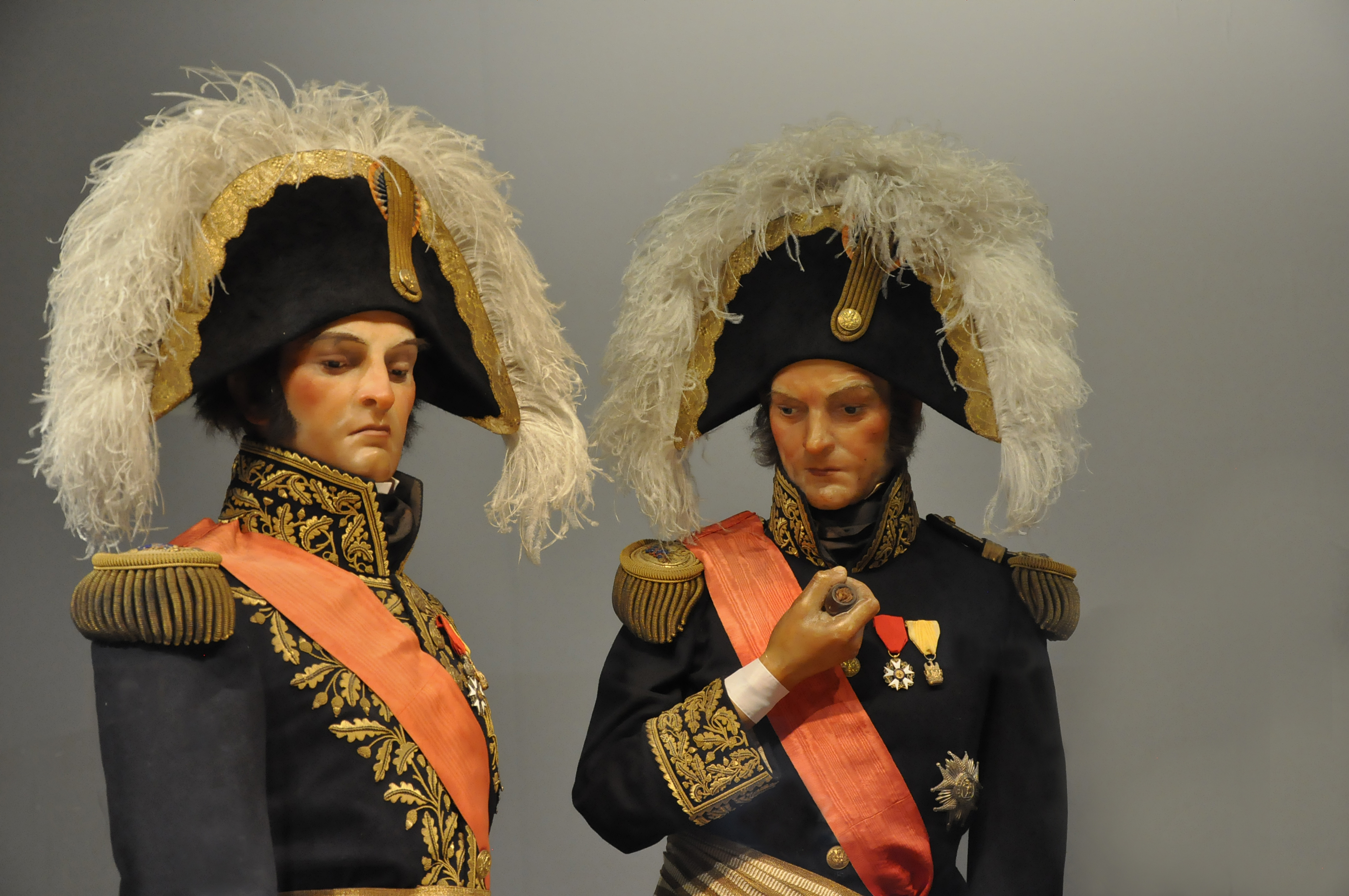
Marshal General Jean-de-Dieu Soult and General Henri Gatien Bertrand

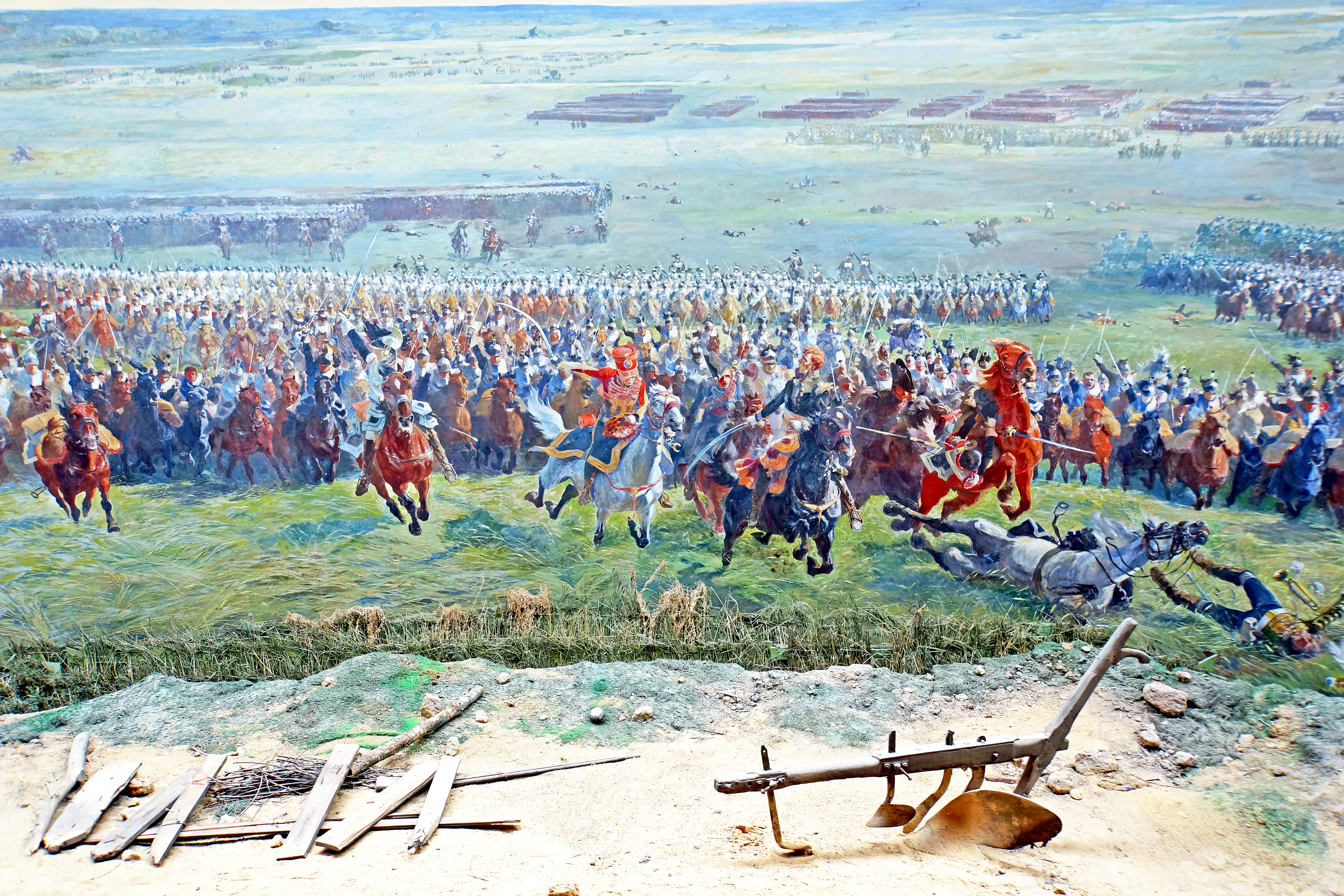
The charge of the French cavalry led by Marshal Ney, in the Panorama rotunda
