= Lillois-Witterzée =

Village in Brabant, Wallonia

Lillois-Witterzée Liloe (Walloon)
- Village
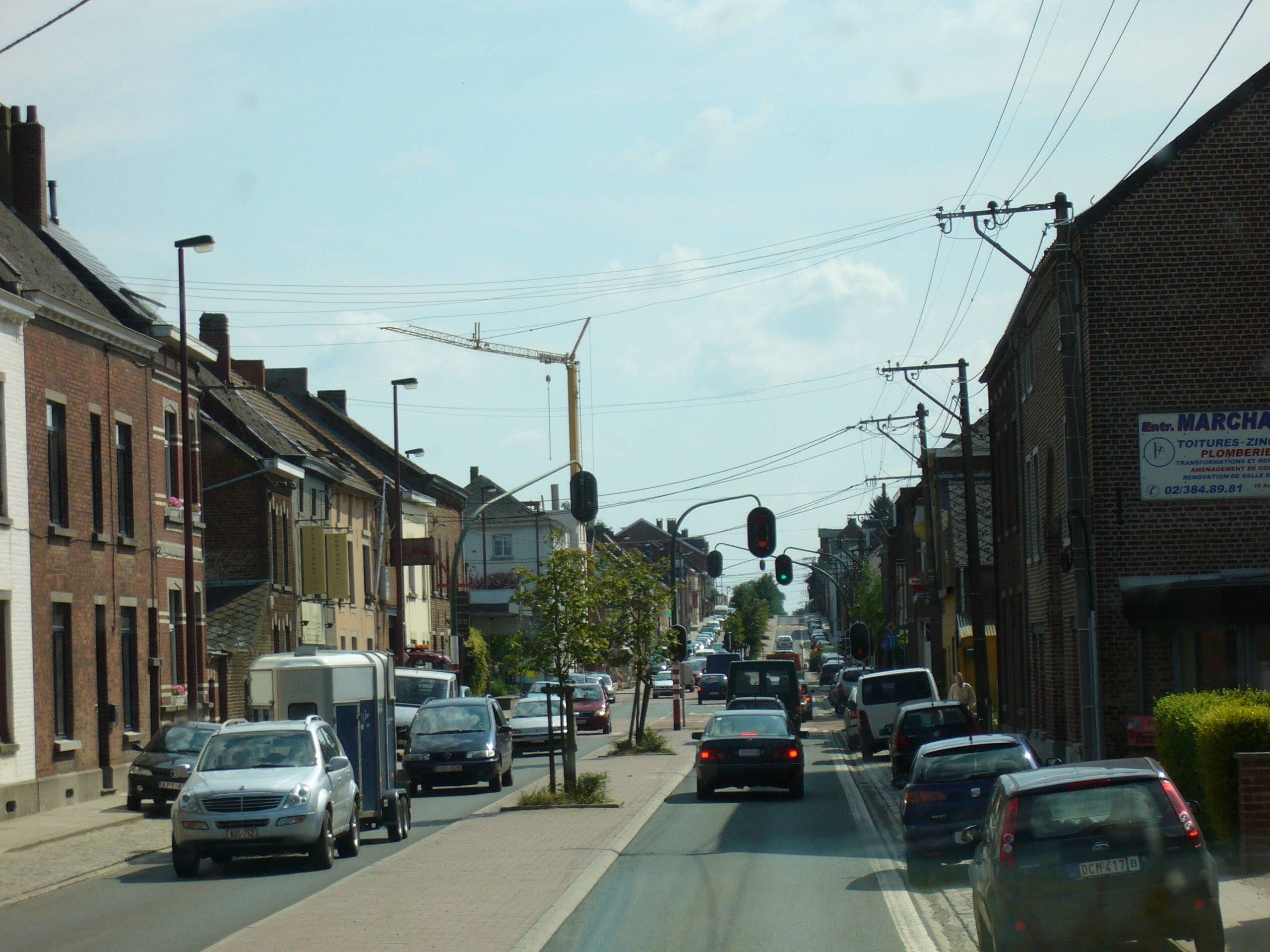
- Main street

- Location within Walloon Brabant

- Location in Belgium
- Coordinates: 50°38′39″N 4°21′53″E
- Country: Belgium
- Region: Wallonia
- Province: Walloon Brabant
- Municipality: Braine-l'Alleud

Lillois-Witterzée (Walloon: Liloe) is a village of Wallonia and a district of the municipality of Braine-l'Alleud, located in the province of Walloon Brabant, Belgium.

It was a municipality in its own right before the fusion of the Belgian municipalities in 1977.
