= Mont-Saint-Jean, Belgium =

Village in Belgium

Coordinates: 50°41′27″N 4°24′22″E

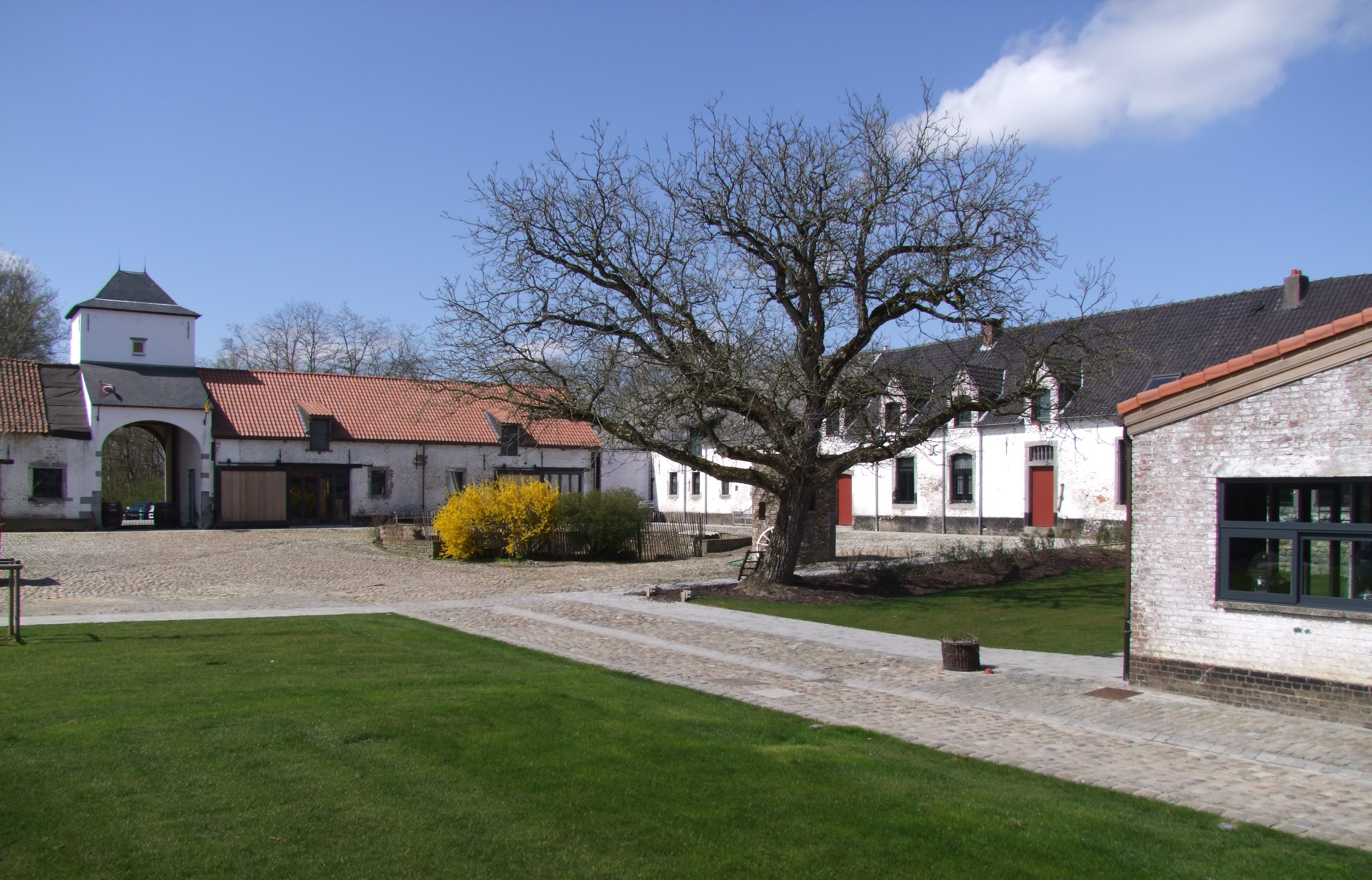
Inner yard of Mont-Saint-Jean Farm which was used as military hospital by the British forces at the end of the Battle of Waterloo. Restored in preparation of the bi-centennial of the Battle of Waterloo, June 2015. It now incorporates a small museum.

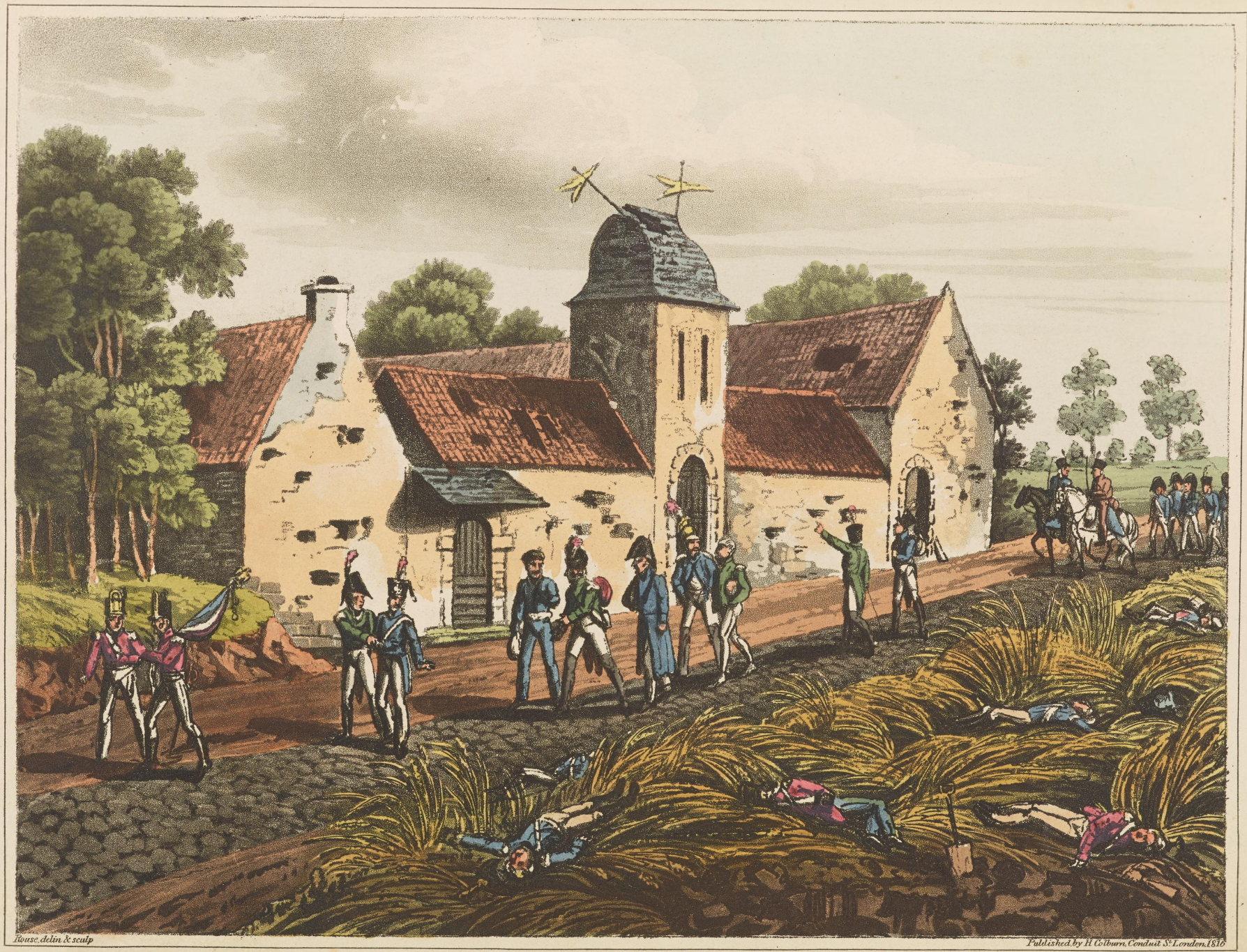
"The farm house of Mont St. Jean. This house being close to the rear of the action, it was much dilapidated by random shot" (1815). Engraver James Rouse

Mont-Saint-Jean (French pronunciation: [mɔ̃ sɛ̃ ʒɑ̃]) is a hamlet located in Wallonia in the province of Walloon Brabant, Belgium, south of Waterloo located partly on Waterloo and partly on Braine-l'Alleud where the National road (N5) going from Brussels to Charleroi crosses the National road (N234) going from Nivelles to Leuven.

== History ==
Mont-Saint-Jean is on the reverse slope of the escarpment where the Battle of Waterloo was fought, and is the name Napoleon Bonaparte gave to the battle (la bataille de Mont-Saint-Jean). At the time of the battle there was a farm called Mont-Saint-Jean Farm, on the Charleroi–Brussels road about halfway between the edge of the escarpment and the village.

Like many, if not all houses all the way to Brussels which could be used for such purpose, Mont-Saint-Jean Farm served as field hospital. The situation is best rendered by this eloquent albeit sober passage by an eyewitness, Sgt-Maj. Cotton:
"The field of battle, after the victory, presented a frightful and most distressing spectacle. (...) Solicitude for the wounded prompted the Duke [of Wellington] to ride back to Brussels immediately after the sanguinary contest. The assistance of the town authorities was requested, in collecting and removing the wounded from the field, burying the dead, etc., as well as to restore confidence amongst the population, and allay the extreme excitement which prevailed throughout Belgium. Right nobly did the inhabitants of Brussels repond to his appeal. The clergy, as might have been expected, were foremost in their exertions to relieve the dreadful agonies of so many gallant and innocent sufferers: the highest in rank rivalled the hardier classes in performing the most trying offices for the mangled heroes that filled the hospitals, and encumbered even many private dwellings. (...)" (Cotton, Edward, A Voice from Waterloo (...), 5th edit., 1854, 137).

== Les Miserables ==
In the novel Les Misérables by Victor Hugo, Volume II, Book I, Chapter X is called "The Plateau of Mont-Saint-Jean" and it describes the massive French cavalry attacks on the British infantry squares situated on the reverse slope of the escarpment at the height of the battle.
