= Panorama of the Battle of Waterloo =

Painting by Louis Dumoulin in a rotunda by Franz Van Ophem

Coordinates: 50°40′45″N 4°24′19″E

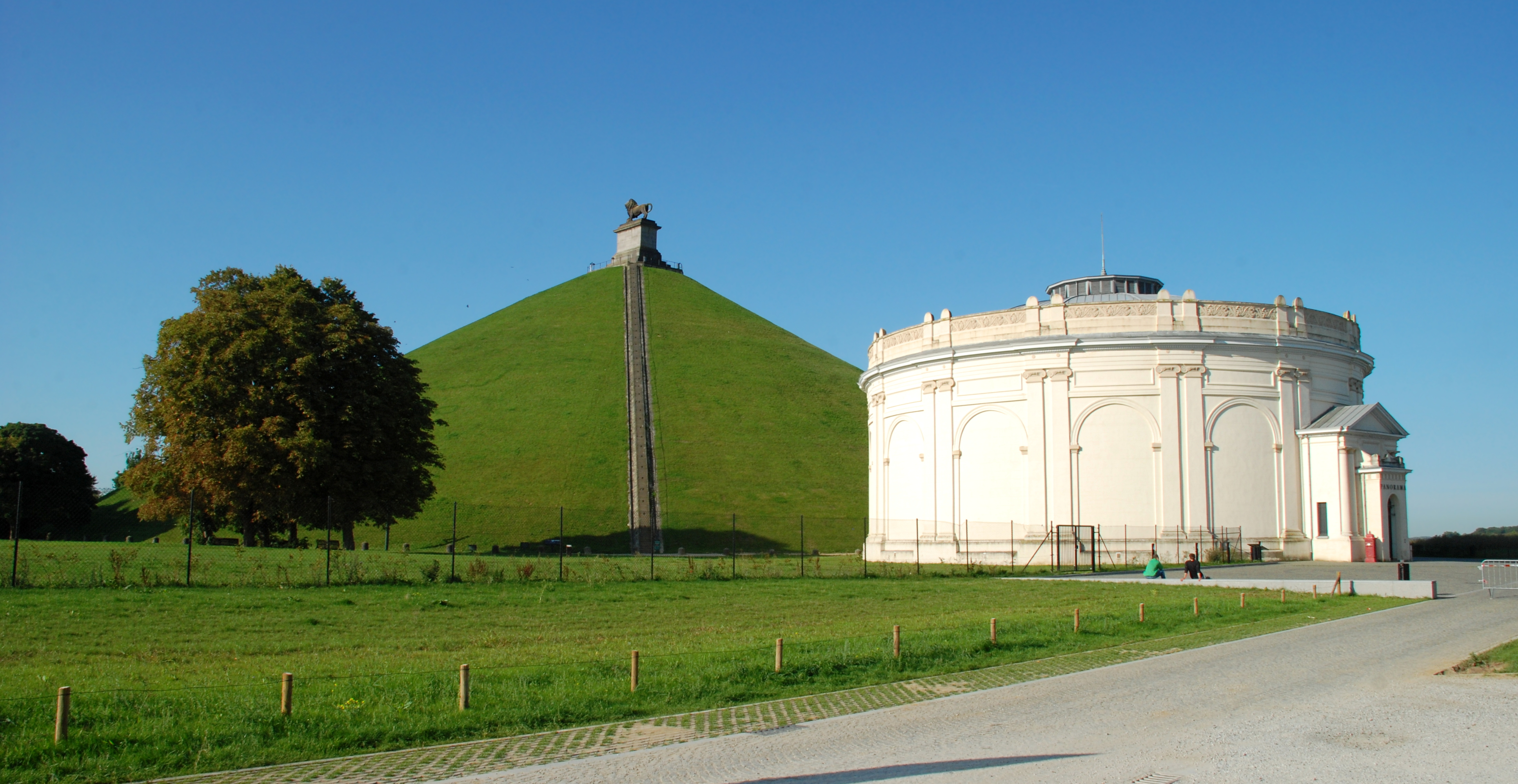
The rotunda of the Panorama of the Battle of Waterloo with the Lion's Mound behind

The Panorama of the Battle of Waterloo (French: Panorama de la Bataille de Waterloo) is a rotunda in Belgium that houses a monumental panoramic painting depicting the Battle of Waterloo. The neoclassical building is located immediately to the north of the Lion's Mound on the battlefield of the Battle of Waterloo in the municipality of Braine-l'Alleud in the Belgian province of Walloon Brabant.

== Design ==
The rotunda was designed by the architect Franz Van Ophem in 1911. It has an external diameter of 35 metres (115 ft) and stands 15 metres (49 ft) high, with a conical roof. The white painted brick walls of the rotunda are decorated with recessed blind arches separated by Ionic pilasters, and crowned with parapet with a frieze of palmettes. The entrance porch has two pairs of Tuscan columns supporting a triangular pediment.

The rotunda houses an oil-on-canvas painting completed by French artist Louis Dumoulin in 1912, with 14 canvas panels sewn together to create a cylinder approximately 110 metres (360 ft) in circumference and 12 metres (39 ft) high. It is lit from above by a ring of glazing around the edge of the conical roof and is viewed from a 5 metres (16 ft) high platform at the centre of the rotunda.

The painting depicts several different episodes from the Battle of Waterloo in 1815, concentrating on charges by French cavalry. Physical elements in front of the painting, including cut-out figures, fences and bodies made of plaster and papier mache, disguise the lower edge of the painting and enhance its immersive quality.

The building and the painting were protected as historical monuments in 1998. In 2008 the Belgian government proposed that the panorama should be included within a UNESCO World Heritage Site listing.

The Waterloo Panorama is one of few original panoramas that have survived and which are still exhibited in their original location. Other panoramas of the Battle of Waterloo, by Charles Verlat, Paul Philippoteaux and Charles Castellani have been lost.

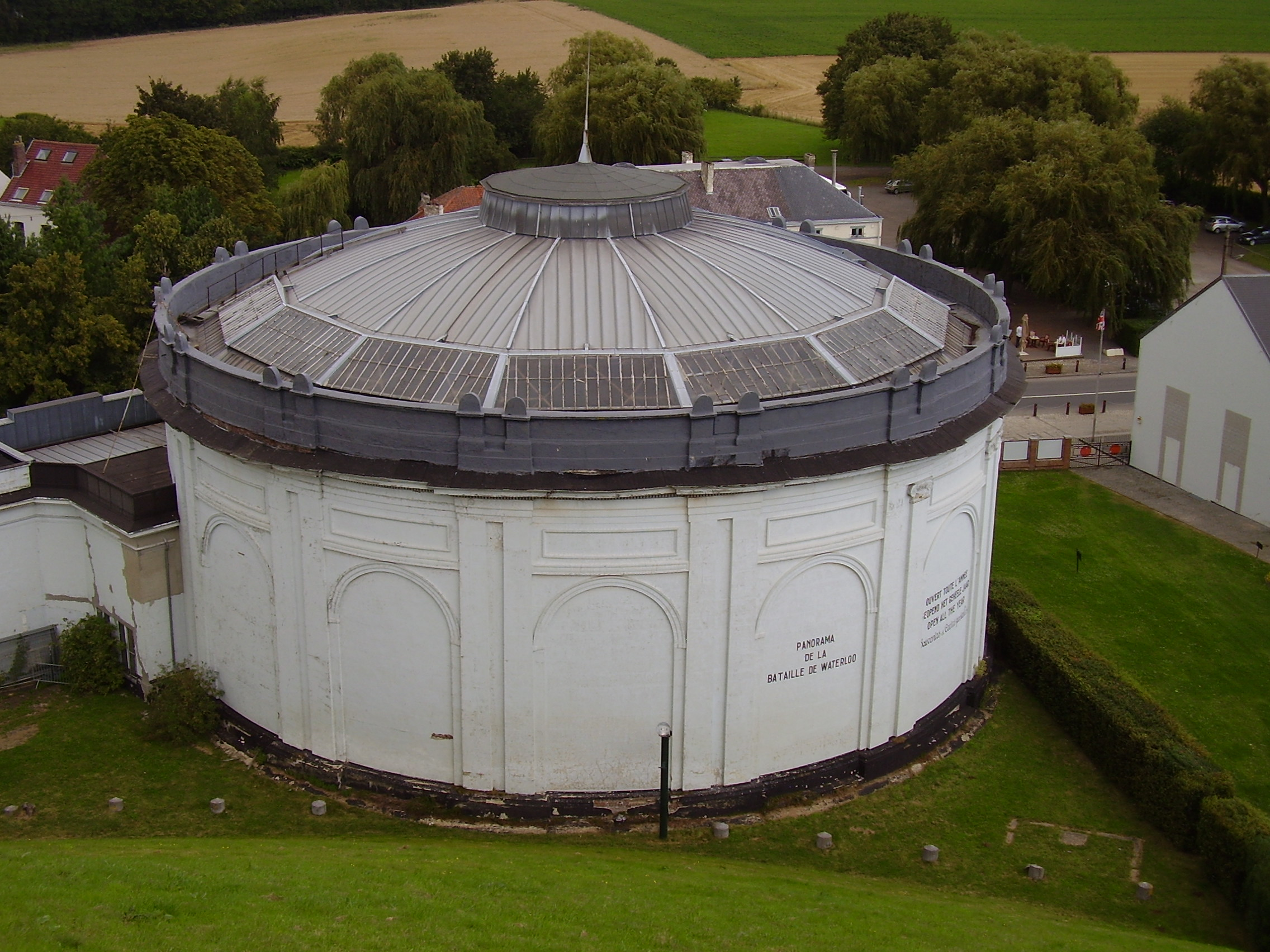
The rotunda as seen from the Lion's Mound

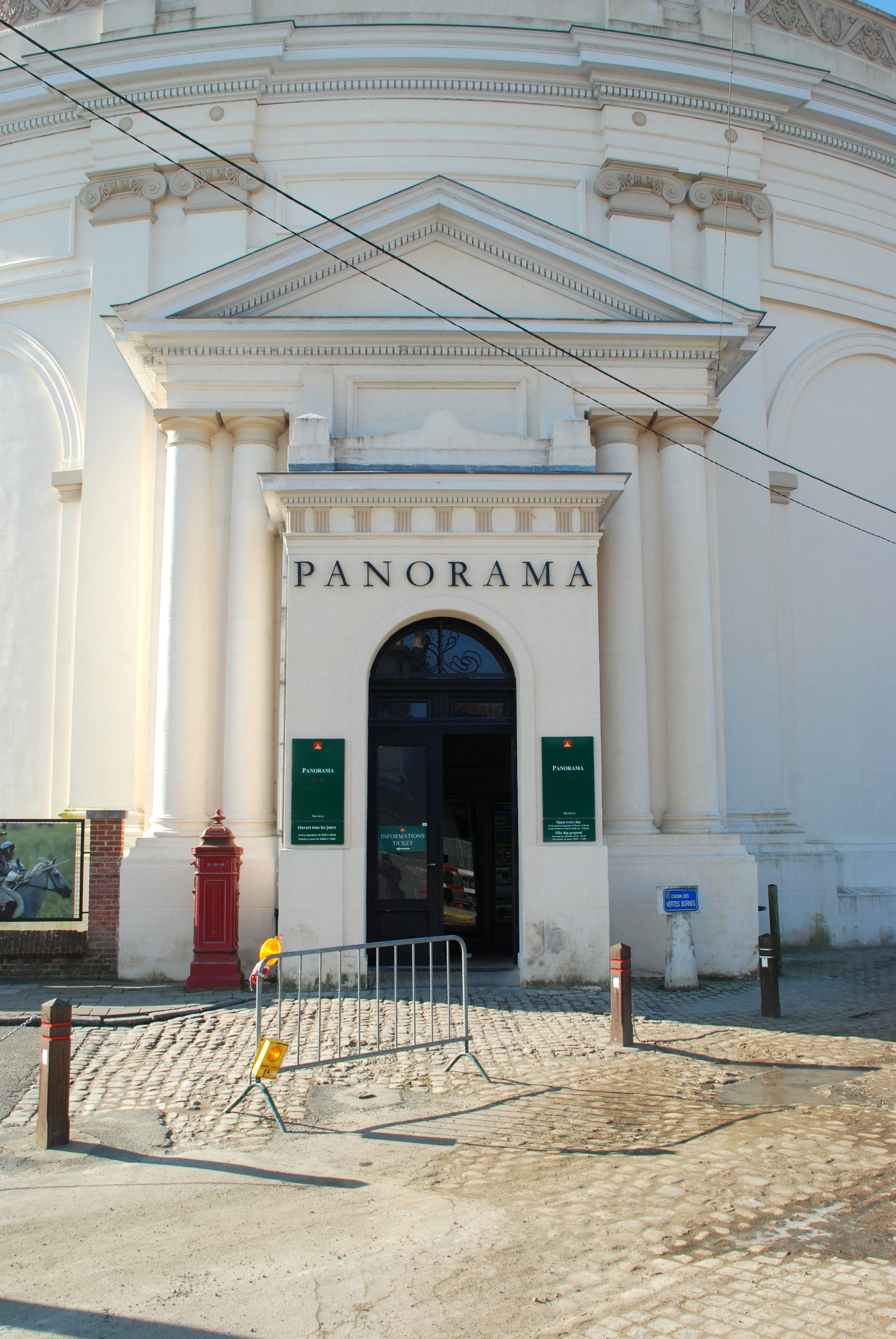
The entrance

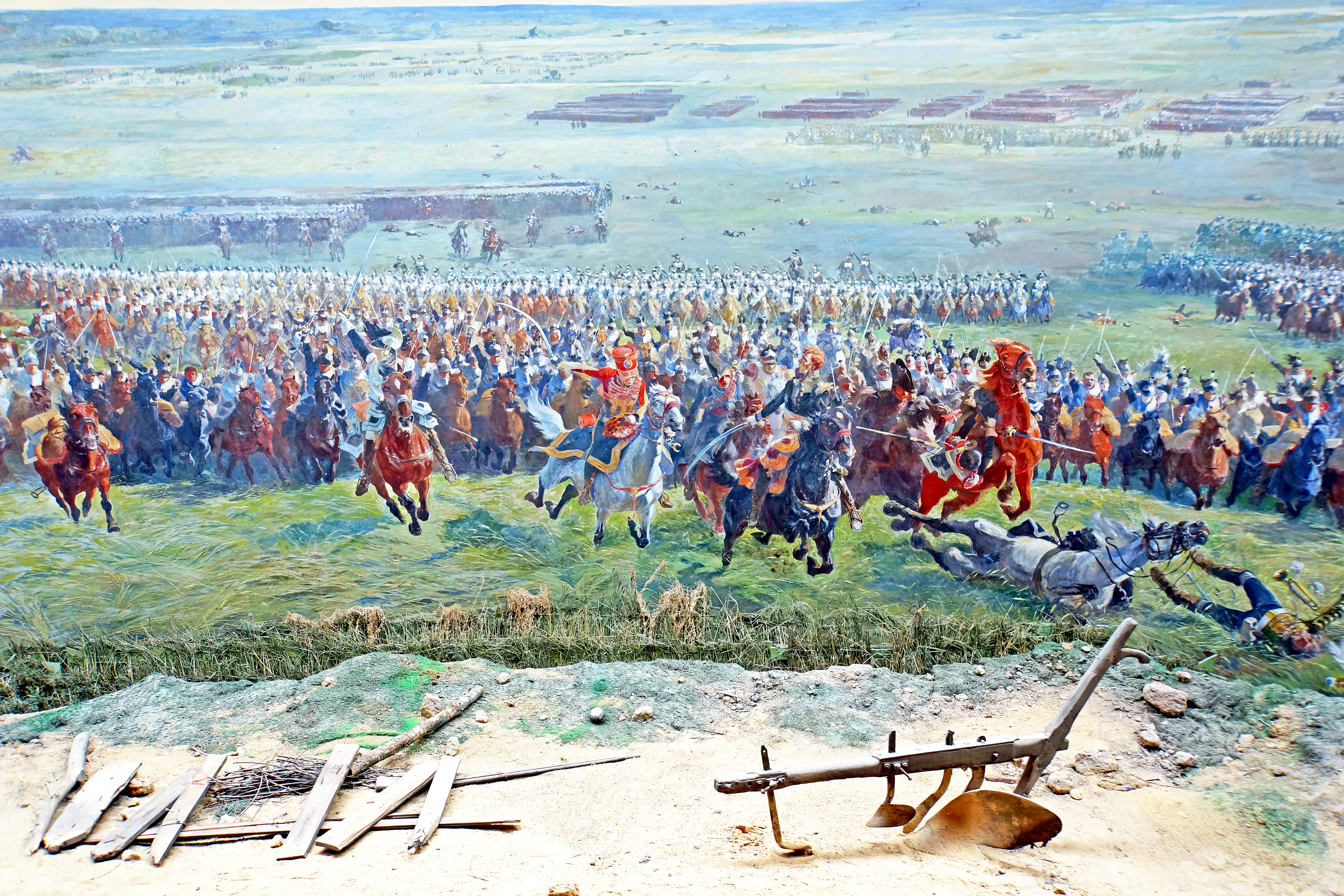
Painting detail: Marshal Ney of France leading a charge

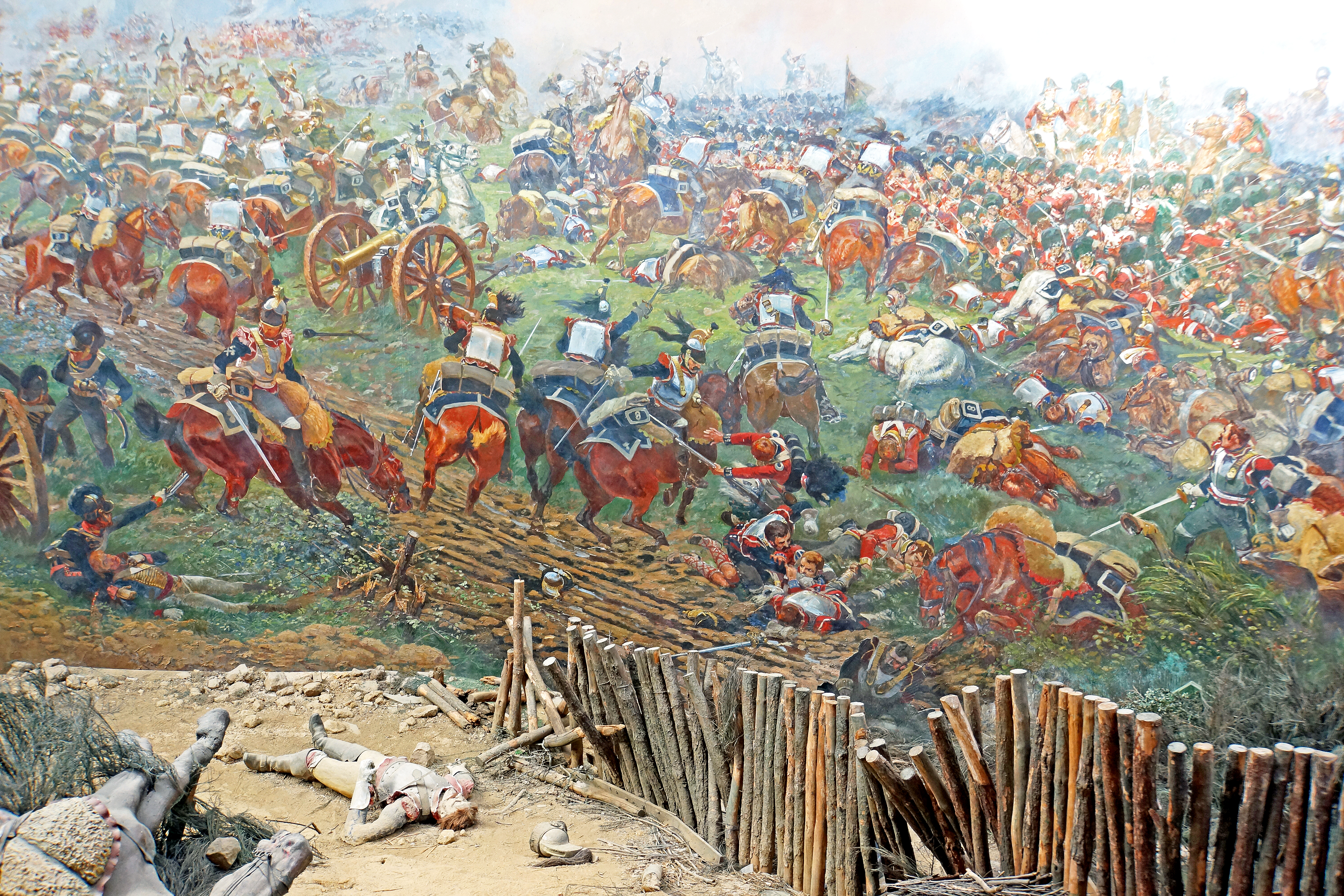
Painting detail: the Duke of Wellington and his staff (top right) sheltering from French cuirassiers in a square of Highland infantry

== See also ==
- List of Waterloo Battlefield locations
