= Braine-l'Alleud =

Municipality in Walloon Brabant province, Wallonia, Belgium

Braine-l'Alleud: Brinne-l'-Alou (Walloon); Eigenbrakel (Dutch)
- Municipality
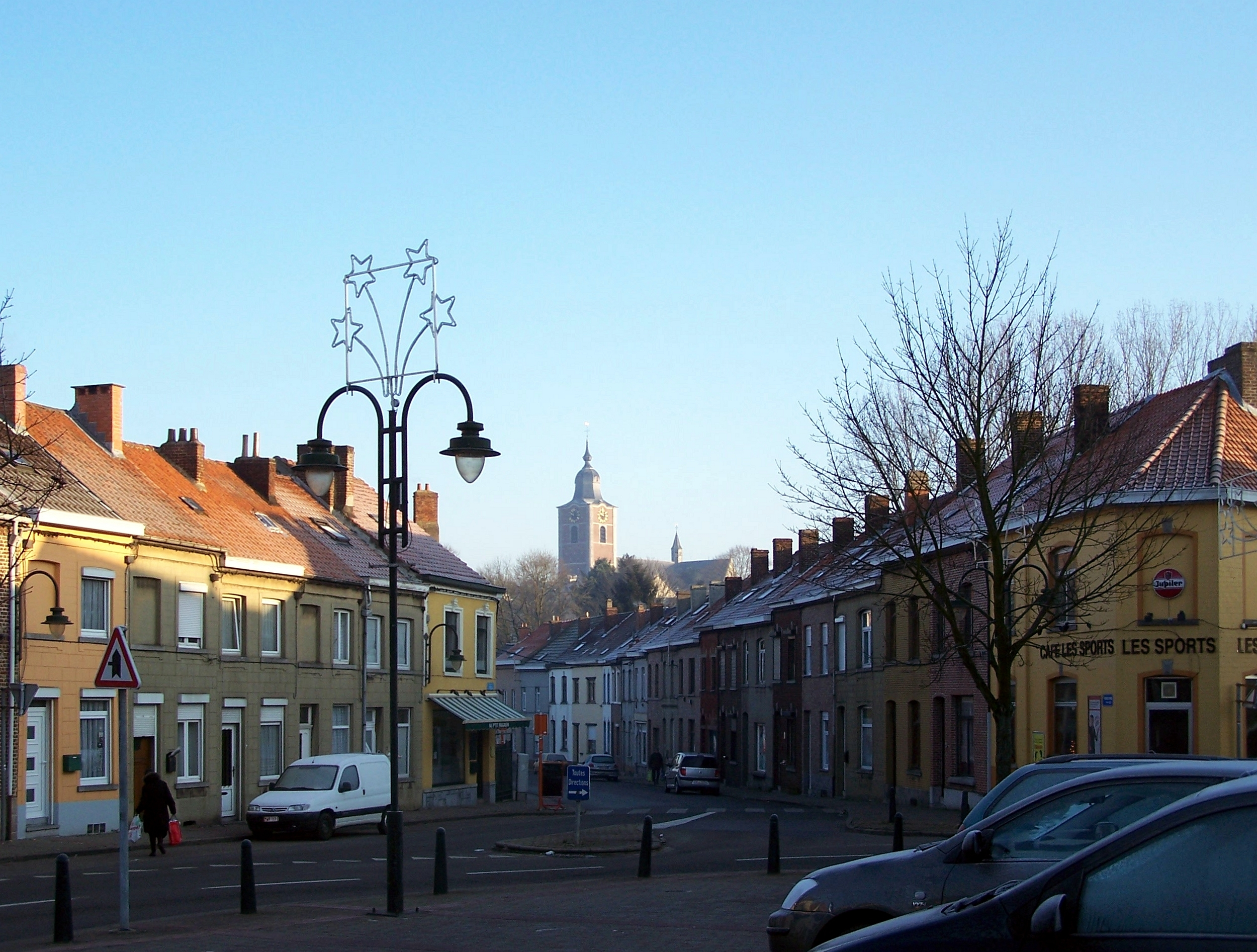

- Flag Coat of arms

- The municipality of Braine-l'Alleud in Walloon Brabant
- Interactive map of Braine-l'Alleud
- Location in Belgium
- Coordinates: 50°41′N 04°22′E
- Country: Belgium
- Community: French Community
- Region: Wallonia
- Province: Walloon Brabant
- Arrondissement: Nivelles

Government
  - Mayor: Vincent Scourneau (MR)
  - Governing party: MR

Area
  - Total: 52.32 km^{2} (20.20 sq mi)

Population (2018-01-01)
  - Total: 39,837
  - Density: 761.4/km^{2} (1,972/sq mi)
- Postal codes: 1420, 1421, 1428
- NIS code: 25014
- Area codes: 02
- Website: www.braine-lalleud.be

Braine-l'Alleud (French: [bʁɛn lalø]; Walloon: Brinne-l'-Alou; Dutch: Eigenbrakel [ˈɛiɣə(m)ˌbraːkəl]) is a municipality of Wallonia, in the province of Walloon Brabant, Belgium, about 20 kilometres (12 miles) south of Brussels.

The municipality consists of the following districts: Braine-l'Alleud (including the hamlet of Sart-Moulin), Lillois-Witterzée, and Ophain-Bois-Seigneur-Isaac. Bordering Flanders, the town is home to a minority of Dutch speakers.

The famous Lion of Waterloo, where the eponymous battle took place, is in the territory of Braine-l'Alleud.

== History ==
=== Middle Ages ===
Several archaeological finds point to prehistoric settlements in this area. The first historical mention of a parish on Braine-l'Alleud's current territory, then called Dudinsart, dates from 1131, date at which Godfrey I, Duke of Brabant ceded it to the Abbey of Gembloux. The Duke, however, still owned exempt land (or franchise) on this territory, as specified in a legal document by Henry I dated 1197. The name of the municipality changed to the current one, derived from "Braine", former name of the stream that crosses its territory (now called the "Hain"), and "alleu(d)", a medieval French word designating exempt land (English allod). The latter name was added to the former to distinguish this community from two neighbouring ones also called Braine.

At the beginning, the franchise might not have been much more than a right to local administration. By 1489, however, the local lord enjoyed complete juridical power on its territory, which was still formally part of the fiefdom obtained from the Duke of Brabant.

=== Battle of Waterloo ===
In 1815, part of the fighting that took place at the Battle of Waterloo actually occurred on the territory of Braine-l'Alleud. The town's church of Saint-Étienne became a field hospital.

== Sights ==
- The Lion's Mound, erected on the site of the Battle of Waterloo, attracts thousands of visitors every year. A nearby visitor centre, a wax museum and a painted Waterloo Panorama also help retrace the events that led to Napoleon's defeat in 1815.
- Converted into a tourist information centre, the former house of Cardinal Mercier is a good starting point to explore the town.
- Braine-l'Alleud is also home to a (slightly) smaller version of the well-known Manneken Pis, named El Gamin qui piche ("The Peeing Kid" in Walloon).
- The hamlet of Sart-Moulin is the inverted name of which inspired Hergé's Moulinsart castle.
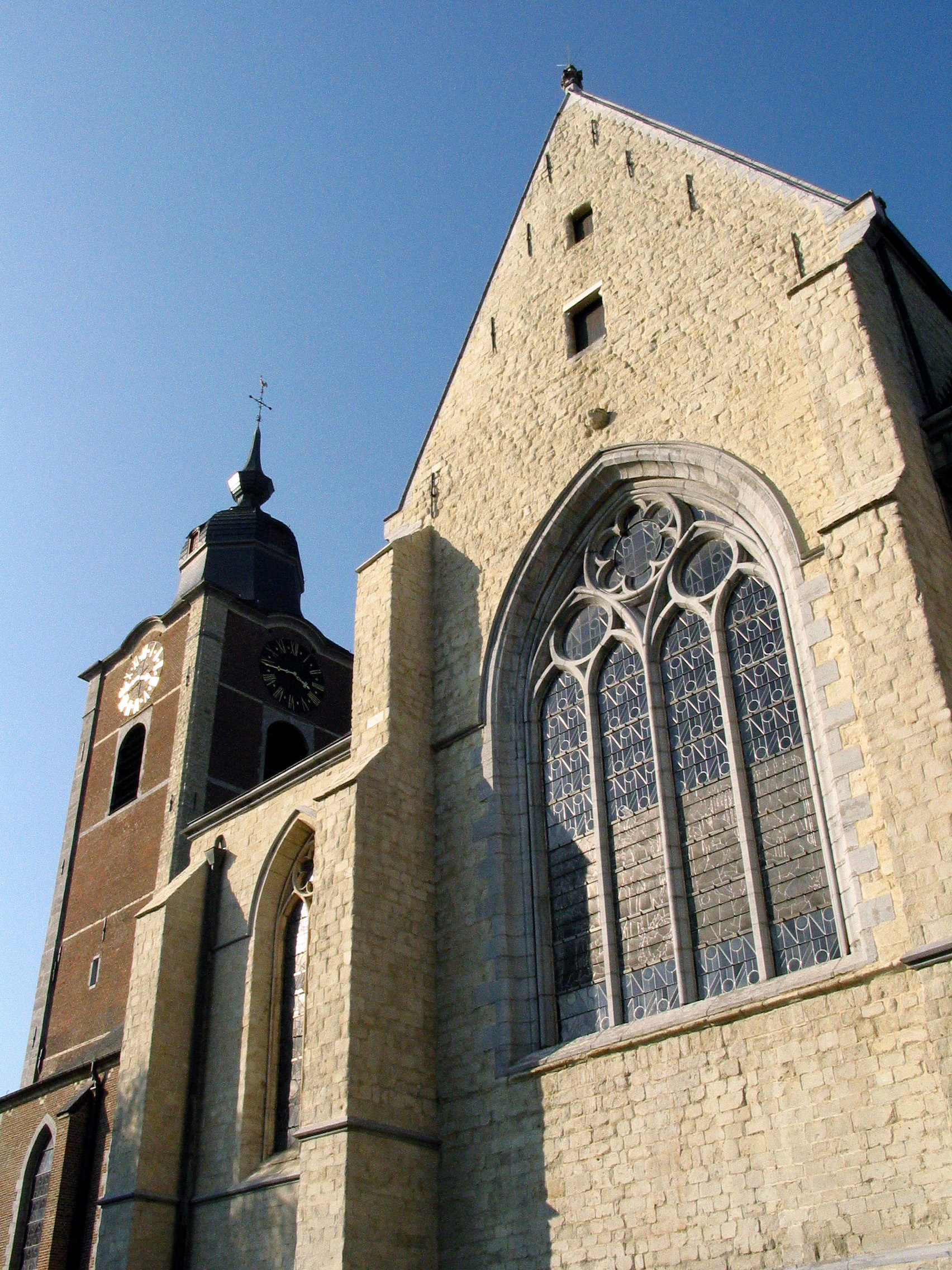
Church of St. Étienne

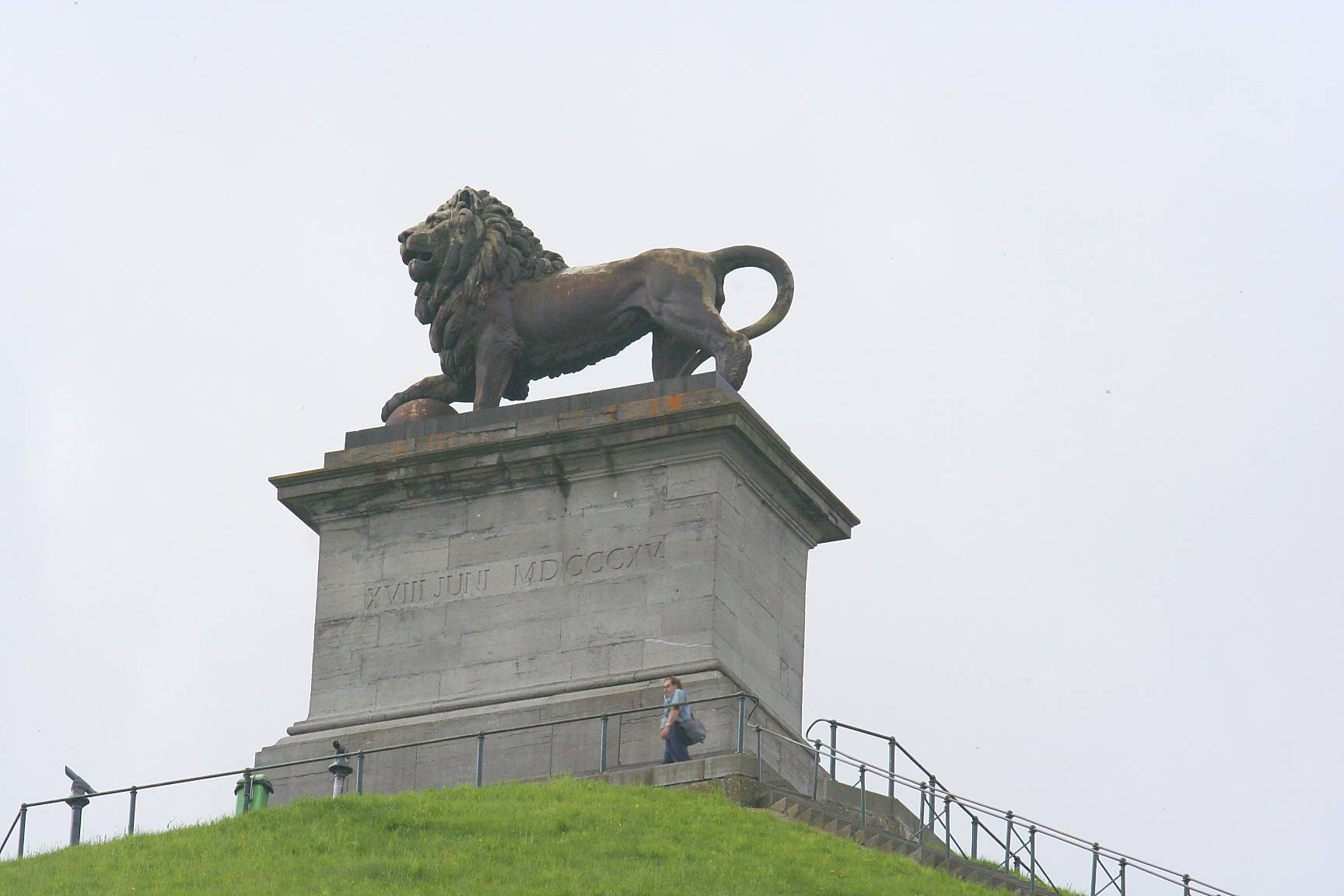
The Butte du Lion ("Lion's Mound") on the battlefield of Waterloo

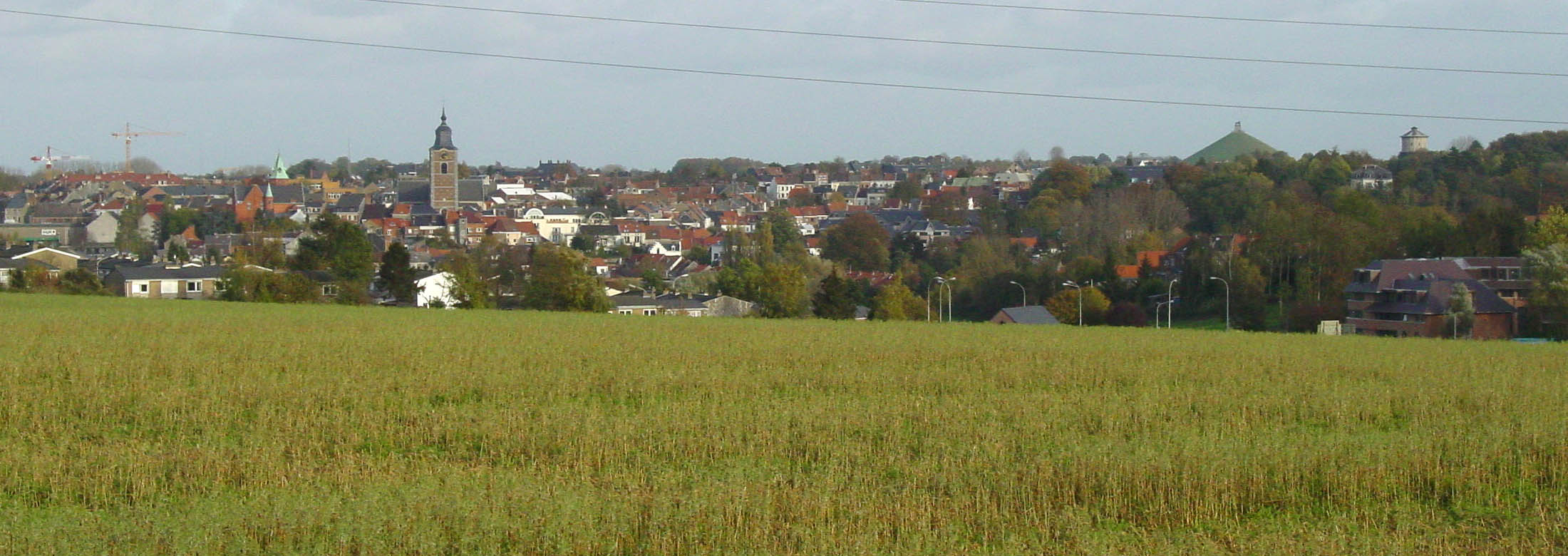
View of the town from the west

== Sport ==
Braine l'Alleud is home to RCS Braine football club, founded in 1913 and one of the oldest continuously existing clubs in the country.

The city also has a successful women's basketball club, BC Castors Braine.

The free-to-play, 18-hole Parc du Bourdon disc golf course is situated 1 kilometer from Braine L'Alleud train station.

== Folklore ==
- Both Ophain and Braine-l'Alleud host yearly carnivals featuring giant puppets like in most other Belgian towns.

== Famous inhabitants ==
- Johannes Tinctoris, Franco-Flemish musicologist and composer (c. 1435–1511), was born in the municipality.
- Désiré-Joseph Mercier, cardinal of the Roman Catholic Church and national hero (1851–1926)
- Paul-Henri Spaak, politician and statesman (1899–1972)
- Gaston Reiff, track-and-field athlete (1921–1992)
- Edward Still, football manager born to English parents (born 1990)
- Will Still, football manager born to English parents (born 1992)
- Amaury Bonduel, racing driver (born 1999)

== Transportation ==
- Rail: Braine l'Alleud has its own railway station part of the SNCB/NMBS network, served by the line number 124. See Braine-l'Alleud railway station.
- Bus: Société Régionale Wallonne du Transport (SRWT) (Walloon Regional Transport Company) operates under the name of "TEC Brabant Wallon".

It is served by the following 10 bus lines:

Line	From	Via	Via	To
Line 36	Braine-l'Alleud			Wavre
Line 40	Uccle	Alsemberg		Braine-l'Alleud
Line 65	Braine-le-Comte	Virginal	B.S.I	Braine-l'Alleud/Nivelles
Line 66	Braine-l'Alleud			Nivelles
Line 67	Braine-l'Alleud Barrière			Braine-l'Alleud Railway Station
Line 75	Braine-l'Alleud			Waterloo
Line 114	Braine-l'Alleud			Halle
Line 115	Braine-l'Alleud			Tubize
Line 3 Rapido Bus	Waterloo	Braine-l'Alleud	Ottignies	Louvain-de-Neuve (LLN)
Line W	Brussels	Waterloo		Braine-l'Alleud

- Taxi: Multiple taxi services exist and pick up and drop off around the town.
- Bicycle: Dedicated bicycle paths exist in the surroundings.

== International relations ==
=== Twin towns – Sister cities ===
Braine-l'Alleud is twinned with:

Basingstoke, Hampshire, England, United Kingdom; Drummondville, Québec, Canada	Menden, North Rhine-Westphalia, Germany; Ouistreham, Calvados, Normandy, France; Šlapanice, South Moravian Region, Czech Republic
