= Waterloo campaign: Quatre Bras to Waterloo =

Army movements inbetween the two battles

- Part of The Waterloo campaign
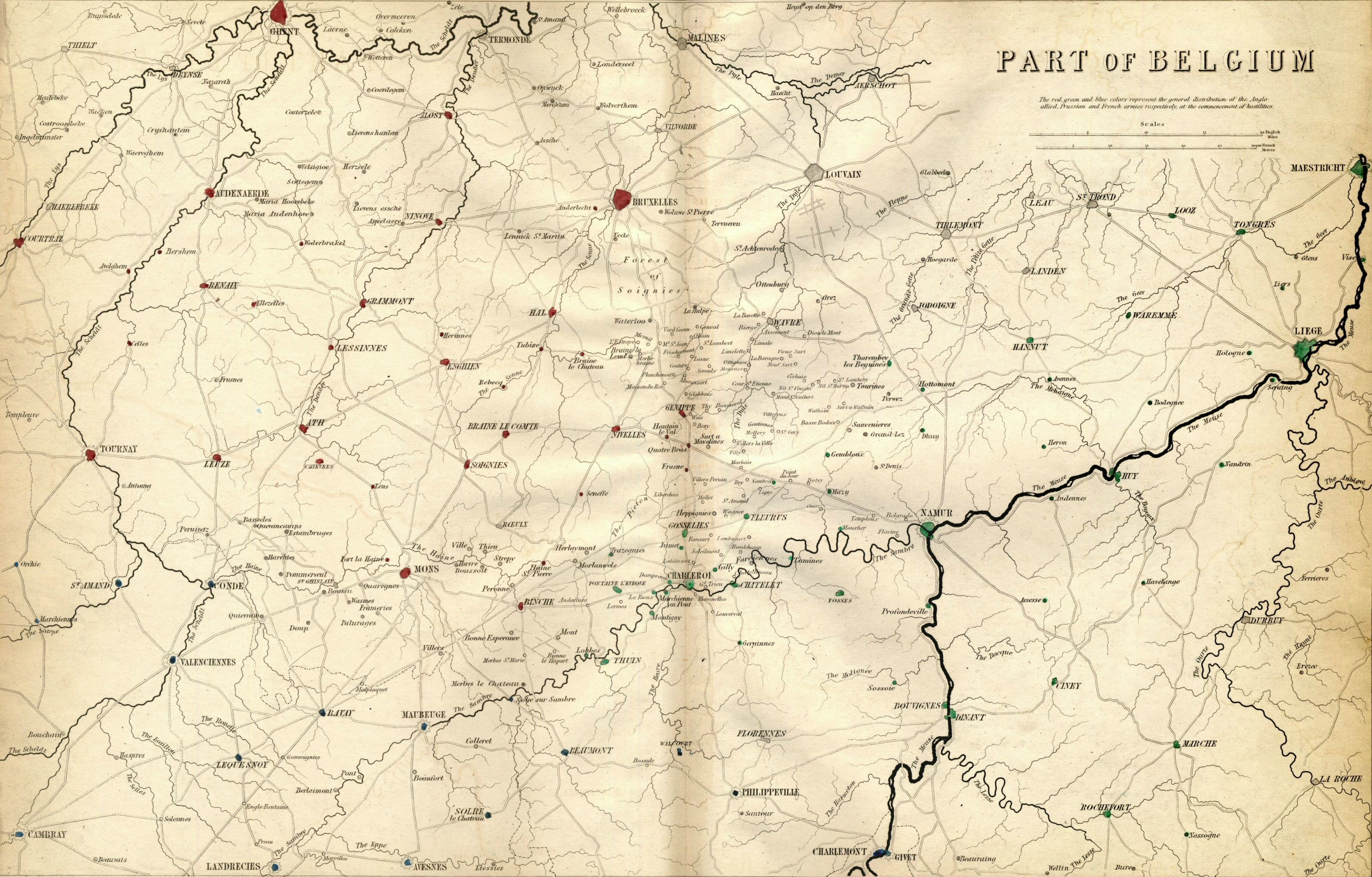
- A portion of Belgium with some places marked in colour to indicate the initial deployments of the armies just before the commencement of hostilities on 15 June 1815: red Anglo-allied, green Prussian, blue French
Date	17 June 1815
Location	From Quatre Bras through Genappe to Waterloo in, Belgium
Result	The Anglo-allied army retreats and the French advance

Belligerents
France	Seventh Coalition: United Kingdom; Netherlands (Kingdom of Prussia) Prussia; Hanover; Nassau; Brunswick

Commanders and leaders
(First French Empire) Napoleon; (First French Empire) Michel Ney	(United Kingdom of Great Britain and Ireland) Arthur Wellesley, Duke of Wellington; (United Kingdom of Great Britain and Ireland) Earl of Uxbridge

Strength
French Army order of battle	Anglo-allied army order of battle

After the fighting at Quatre Bras (16 June 1815) the two opposing commanders Marshal Ney and the Duke of Wellington initially held their ground while they obtained information about what had happened at the larger Battle of Ligny. They received intelligence that the Prussian army under the command of Prince Blücher had been defeated by the French Army of the North under the command of Napoleon Bonaparte.

Upon receiving this news Wellington organised the retreat of the Anglo-allied army to a place he had identified a year before as the best place in Belgium for him to be able to employ his reverse slope tactics when fighting a major battle: the escarpment close to the village of Waterloo.

On the 17th, aided by thunderstorms and torrential rain and before the arrival of Napoleon, Wellington's army successfully extricated itself from Quatre Bras and passed through the defile of Genappe. The infantry marched ahead and were screened by a large cavalry rearguard. The French harried Wellington's army, but were unable to inflict any substantial casualties before night fell and Wellington's men were ensconced in bivouacs on the plain of Mont-Saint-Jean.

== Prelude ==
After the fighting at Quatre Bras, the two armies settled down for the night. The Anglo-allied army on the field of battle and the French just to the south. The bivouac on the battle field of Quatre Bras, during the night of 16 June, continued undisturbed until about an hour before daylight, when a cavalry patrol having accidentally got between the adverse pickets near Piermont, caused an alarm in that quarter that was quickly communicated to both armies by a rattling fire of musketry, which, rapidly augmenting, extended itself along the line of the advanced posts. Among the first who hastened to ascertain the origin and nature of the engagement was Picton, who, together with other staff officers, as they arrived in succession, on discovering that no advance had been attempted or intended on either side, soon succeeded in restoring confidence. Similar exertions were successfully made on the part of the French officers, and as day began to break upon the scene, both parties resumed their previous tranquillity. In this untoward affair, the pickets furnished by the 1st Hanoverian Brigade (Kielmansegg's), and by the 3rd Brunswick Light Battalion (Ebeling's) were sharply engaged, and a pickets of the Field Battalion Bremen (Langrehre's) suffered considerably.

== Hussar brigade at Quatre Bras ==
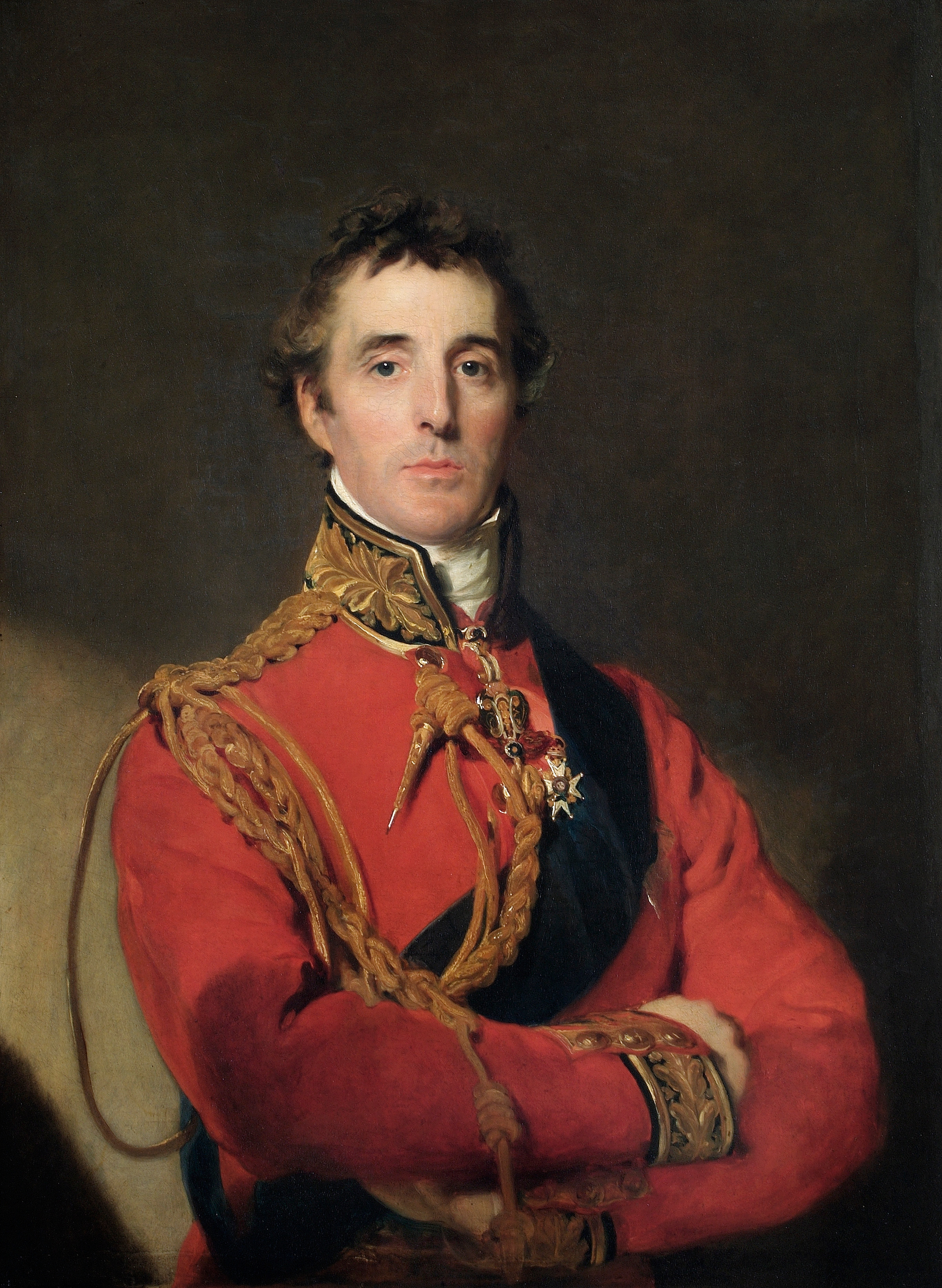
The 1st Duke of Wellington by Thomas Lawrence (1814)

It was not long before Wellington, who had slept at Genappe, arrived at Quatre Bras, where he found Major General Sir Hussey Vivian, whose Brigade of Light Cavalry, consisting of the British 10th Hussars (Quentin's), of the British 18th Hussars (Murray's), and of the 1st Hussars of the King's German Legion (KLG, Wissell's), was posted on the left of that point with two strong pickets thrown out; one, of the 18th Hussars (under Captain Croker) on the Namur road, and the other, of the 10th Hussars, under Major Frederick Howard, in front — with a picket from the latter, under Lieutenant Arnold, on the right of the Namur road.

Vivian, on being asked what account he could give of the French, communicated to Wellington the result of his observations, which were necessarily very limited, as, with the exception of the firing that had taken place, as before mentioned, along the line of pickets, the French had continued perfectly quiet, and had as yet given no indication of any offensive movement.

== British hussar patrol sent down the Namur road ==
Wellington then took a general survey of the battle field, and while sweeping the horizon with his telescope, he discovered a French vedette on some rising ground, in the direction of Fleurus, and a little to the right of the high road leading to Namur, apparently belonging to some picket thrown out from Marshal Ney's extreme right on the previous night, after the battle had ceased; or to some detached Corps placed in that quarter for the purpose of observation, and for the maintenance of the communication between Napoleon and Ney. Wellington had received no intelligence of Blücher; and, probably, judging from the advanced position of the vedette in question that whatever might have been the result of the Battle of Ligny, the Prussians could not have made any forward movement likely to endanger Ney's right, he came to the conclusion that it was quite possible that, on the other hand, Napoleon might have crossed the Namur road, and cut off his communication with Blücher, with the design of manoeuvring upon his left and rear, and causing him to be simultaneously attacked by Ney. Wellington therefore desired Vivian to send a strong patrol along the Namur road to gain intelligence respecting the Prussian Army.

A troop of the 10th Hussars, under Captain Grey, was accordingly despatched on this duty, accompanied by Lieutenant Colonel the Hon. Sir Alexander Gordon, one of Wellington's aides de camp. As the patrol advanced along the road, the French vedette began to circle, evidently to give notice of the approach of an enemy, and then retired. This induced the patrol to move forward with great caution, so as to guard against the possibility of being cut off.

Nevertheless, it continued, but with all due precaution, advancing along the road, until after passing a few scattered cottages, comprising a hamlet called Petit-Marbais (Note: Chaussée de Namur 218, 1495 Villers-la-Ville, Where the outskirts of Marbais touch the Namur road 50.54265°N 4.52638°E).) it reached, about 2.4 kilometres (1.5 mi) further on, some rising ground, about 8.0 kilometres (5 mi) from Quatre Bras, and beyond which was another height. A vedette was observed posted upon the latter, but who had evidently not yet noticed the approach of Captain Grey's troop. Down in the intervening hollow was an isolated house, at the door of which stood a dismounted sentry, and some horses were standing in an adjoining yard. (Note: Possibly at 50.53429°N 4.55909°E — although no house is marked there on the Ferraris van kaart of 1777.)

Captain Grey directed Lieutenant Bacon to patrol towards the house, while he remained with the remainder of the troop, concealed from the French, a disposition favoured by the nature of the ground, and the trees in the hedges, on both sides of the road. When Lieutenant Bacon's party moved forward, it was discovered by the vedette, who began circling, and fired his carbine. The French pocket posted in the house instantly rushed out; several of the men had their jackets and accoutrements off; and the post could easily have been captured, had the special duty on which the British patrol was engaged admitted of an attack. The French turned out very quickly and galloped to the rear along the high road, while Bacon's party was recalled. A few French cavalry galloped up to the vedette on the heights, but evinced no disposition to advance.

== British patrol finds the Prussians at Tilly ==
It had now become sufficiently evident that, commencing from this point, that the French were in possession of the Namur road; but the principal object which Sir Alexander Gordon had in view was yet to be attained. The patrol now retired a little until it reached a cross road, which a peasant pointed out as the Prussian line of retreat. Pursuing this track, the patrol, within an hour, reached Tilly; where General Zieten, who had been placed in temporary command of the Prussian cavalry, was covering the retreat of the Prussian army.

After remaining there about a quarter of an hour, during which Sir Alexander Gordon obtained from General Zieten the most ample information respecting the movements of the Prussians, the patrol commenced its return, at a quick pace, striking into a cross road, which joined the high road at a point nearer to Quatre Bras than the one whence it had left it. The patrol reached Quatre Bras at 7:30; and Sir Alexander Gordon immediately reported to Wellington that the Prussians had retreated towards Wavre, that the French occupied the ground on which the Battle of Ligny had been fought; but that they had not crossed the high road, along which the patrol had proceeded almost into the immediate vicinity of their advanced posts.

== Wellington's order for a retreat and informing Blücher of his plans ==
Map of the Waterloo campaign. Arrows 5 and 6 represent the Wellington's retreat and Napoleon's advance from Quatre Bras to Waterloo.

Napoleon's lack of movement was very notable, and served to satisfy Wellington that, either Napoleon's victory had not been followed up with a vigour by which the safety of his own army would have been imperilled, or, that the victory had not been of a character sufficiently decisive to have enabled Napoleon to avail himself of such an advantage.

Having ascertained that the contingency for which he was fully prepared had actually taken place, Wellington decided upon retreating along the Brussels road until he reached a position in front of the point of junction of the roads leading from Charleroi and Nivelles upon Brussels: the Mont-Saint-Jean escarpment near the village of Waterloo. On this position he might rely upon the aid of a sufficient portion of Blücher's forces from Wavre which, combined with his own, would enable the Coalition to confront Napoleon and his main army with a numerical superiority at a decisive point. Wellington was familiar with the topography of the position having identified it as a possible battle site a year previously while surveying the territory around Brussels. (Note: In a four-page memorandum, dated Paris 22 September 1814, Wellington wrote to Lord Bathurst, Secretary of State for War and the Colonies, identifying good defensive positions for an army in the field "There are, however, good positions for an army at La Trinité and at Renaix behind Tournay; another between Tournay and Mons, on the high grounds about Blaton; there are many good positions about Mons; the course of the Haine from Binch towards Mons would afford some good ones; about Nivelle, and between that and Binch, there are many advantageous positions; and the entrance of the forêt de Soignies by the high road which leads to Brussels from Binch, Charleroi, and Namur, would, if worked upon, afford others." And of course "the entrance of the forêt de Soignies" is a description for Mont-Saint-Jean and the Waterloo battle field. In 1815 Lord Bathurst said in the House of Lords that "'The position of Waterloo, was one well known to his Grace. In the summer of last year, his Grace went there in his way to Paris, and on that occasion he took a military view of it.— He then declared, that if ever it should be his fortune to defend Brussels, Waterloo would be the position he would occupy'".)

Shortly after the departure of the patrol of the 10th Hussars, along the Namur road, Wellington received some despatches from England, to which he gave his attention; and now that he had satisfied himself as to the real state of things, he issued his orders for the movements of his distant units:

- The 2nd division of British infantry (Clinton's) to march from Nivelles to Waterloo at 10:00
- The Brigades of the 4th Division (Colville's) at Nivelles were to march on Waterloo at 10:00
- The Brigades of the 4th Division at Braine-le-Comte, and on the road from Braine-le-Comte to Nivelles, to collect and halt at Braine-le-Comte
- All the baggage on the road from Braine-le-Comte to Nivelles was to return immediately to Braine-le-Comte, and to proceed from there to Hal and Brussels.
- The spare musket ammunition was to be immediately parked behind Genappe.
- The Corps under the command of Frederick, Prince of Orange was to move from Enghien on that evening of 17 June, and take up a position in front of Hal, occupying Braine-le-Château with two battalions.
- Colonel Estorff was to fall back with his Brigade on Hal, and place himself under the orders of Prince Frederick.

Having issued order for those units present on the battle field and in the vicinity were to retreat, Wellington lay down on the ground near Quatre Bras, covered his head with one of the newspapers he had been reading (which had accompanied those despatches from England), and appeared to fall asleep. After remaining some time in this state, he again rose, mounted his horse, and rode a little distance down the battle field in front of Quatre Bras. He then looked about through his telescope, and expressed to those about him his astonishment at the perfect stillness of the French, remarking at the same time, "What if they should be also retiring? It is not at all impossible".

A second officer, Lieutenant Massow, had been despatched from the Prussian to the Anglo-allied headquarters; and it was about this time that he reached Wellington. He informed Wellington of the Prussian retreat upon Wavre, and the position Blücher intended to be assumed in that quarter. It was of a nature which, taken altogether, was so far satisfactory, that Wellington immediately asked Lieutenant Massow to inform Blücher, that he intended to retreat and take up a position south of Waterloo where he proposed to stand and fight, provided Blücher would detach two corps to his assistance.

== The Anglo-allied light troops retire ==
The following is the manner in which the retreat of the Anglo-allied infantry, then in full operation, was executed.

It was an important matter to mask the retreat as much as possible, so as to gain time for the free and unimpeded movement of the army along the high road leading to the position in front of Waterloo. For this purpose, the light troops continued to maintain the line of outposts, until their respective supports, which had remained stationary sufficiently long to conceal the retreat of the troops in their rear, began also to retire.

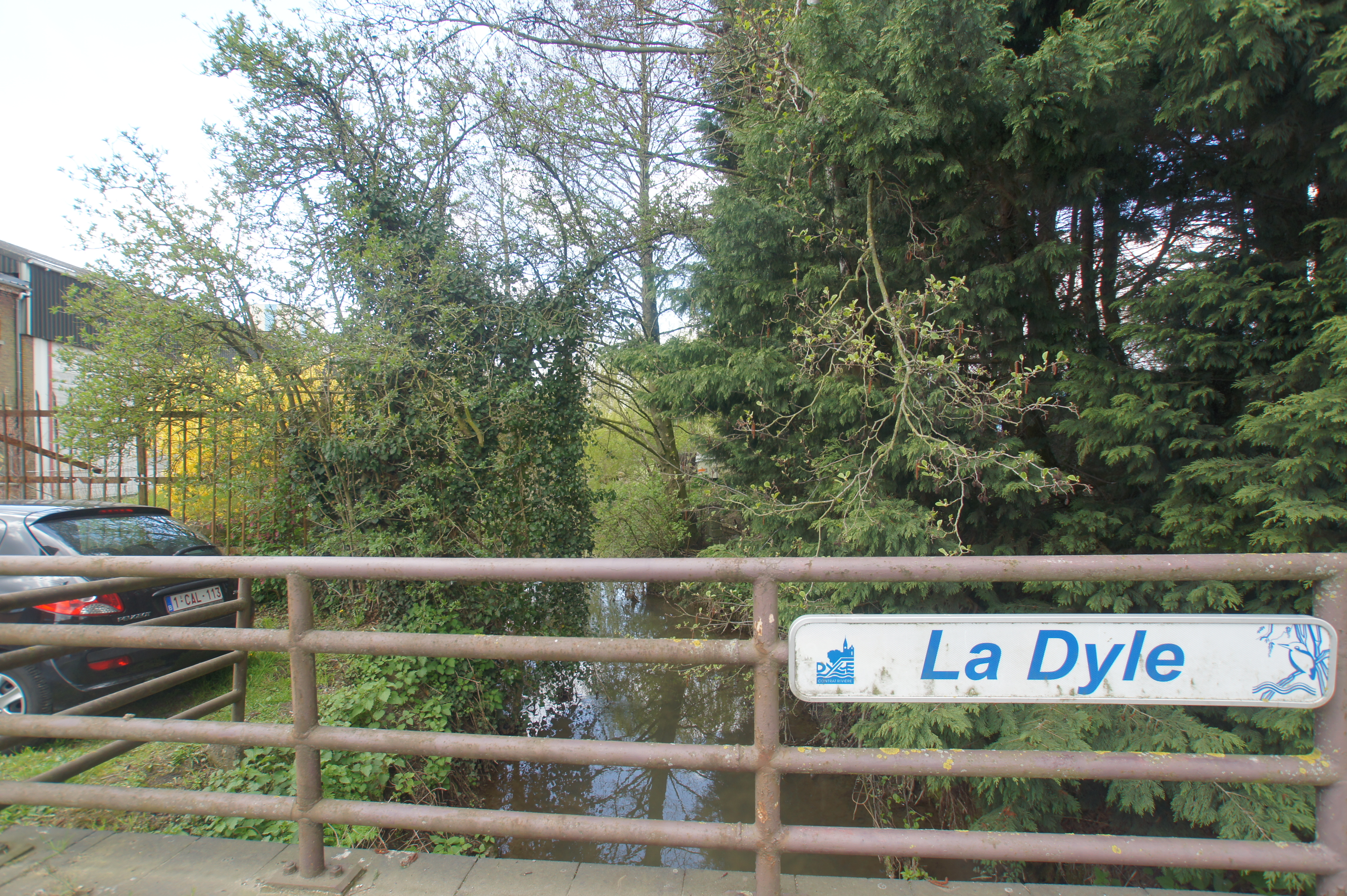
A modern bridge over the Dyle in Genappe.

The British 1st (Cooke's) and 5th (Picton's) Divisions, and the Dutch-Belgian 2nd Division (Sedlnitsky's), and also the Brunswick Corps (commanded by Olfermann The Duke of Brunswick having been killed the previous day), effected their retreat in excellent order, notwithstanding the delay that was created by the narrowness of the bridge and street of Genappe. Their retreat was covered by the 3rd Division (Alten's), to which were added for this purpose, the 1st Battalion of the British 95th Rifles (Barnard's, the Brunswick 2nd and 3rd light battalions (Brandenstein's and Ebeling's), the Brunswick Advanced Guard Battalion (Rauschenplatt's), and the light companies of British Brigade of Guards(Byng's).

The main body of Alten's Division commenced its retreat about 11:00 the 2nd Brigade, King's German Legion (Ompteda's) was withdrawn to Sart-à-Mavelines, which it immediately occupied, as also the Wood of Les Censes in its front. The British 5th Brigade (Colin Halkett's) then retired secretly until it reached some favourable ground, a little distance in rear of Ompteda's Brigade, upon which it was immediately drawn up. The 1st Hanoverian Brigade (Kiblmansegge's) was withdrawn still further to the rear, and occupied a third position. Thus posted, the Division was ordered, in the event of being attacked, to retire by Brigades alternately.

It was a little before midday when the light troops of Alten's Division began to retire. They occupied the advanced line, commencing from the southern extremity of the Wood of Bossu on the right, extending along Gemion-court and the enclosures of Piermont, and crossing the Namur road on the left: from which line they gradually and slowly fell back upon Ompteda's Brigade, in a manner evincing admirable skill, steadiness, and regularity.

In order more effectually to mask the movements on the allied side of the Namur road, the whole of the cavalry was drawn up in two lines immediately contiguous to, and in rear of, that road; the heavy cavalry forming the second line, and pickets being thrown out from the First line, to relieve those of the retiring infantry.

The main body of Alten's Division now commenced its further retreat; but not by alternate brigades, this mode having been directed only in the event of an attack; the latter retired successively in the order in which they stood, preserving their relative distances, so that they might commence the alternate system of retreat, if attacked. To facilitate the passage of other portions of the army through the narrow defile of the bridge and town of Genappe, this division retired by Baisy-Thy, and crossed the Dyle, lower down the stream, by the bridge at Ways, Belgium.

== Ney's views and dispositions ==
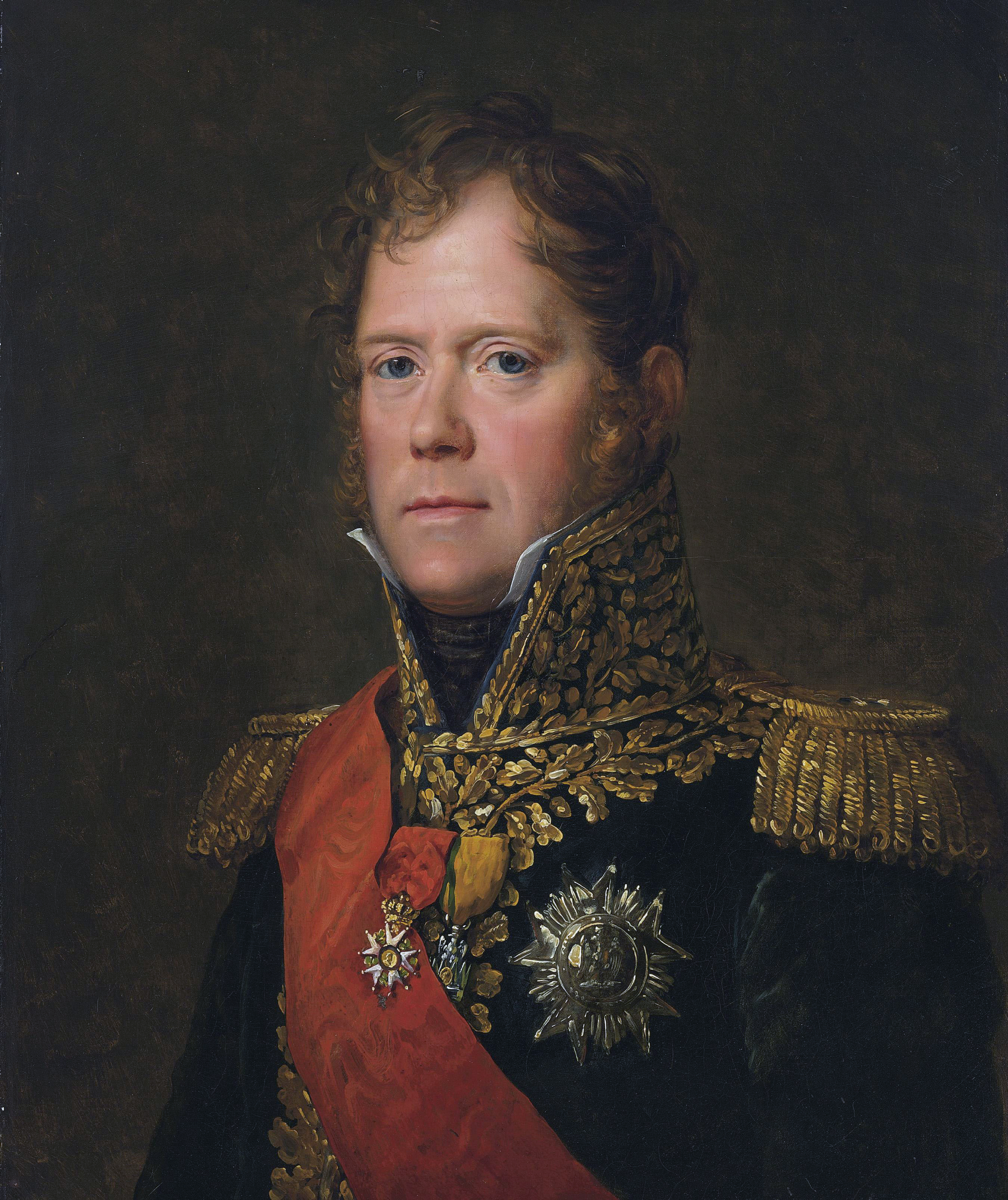
Marshal Michel Ney by François Gérard (c. 1805)

In the early part of the morning, Marshal Ney had, like his opponent, been ignorant of the result of the Battle of Ligny; but he was aware that the Anglo-allied army had been considerably reinforced during the night, principally by the arrival of its cavalry.

Ney calculated that if Napoleon had gained a victory, and crossed the Namur road, the longer Wellington remained in the position of Quatre Bras, the greater the danger he incurred of having not only his communication with Blücher effectually cut off, but also his main line of retreat upon Brussels intercepted; and that in such a case it was wiser not to advance against the British general, as the latter might then retire, and thus elude the effect of a combined operation between Napoleon's and his own forces.

Ney also judged that if, on the other hand, the French Emperor had been defeated, an attack made on his own part, upon the Anglo-allied army, might subject himself to the risk of having to contend against a combined operation between Wellington and Blücher; and thus expose both his own and Napoleon's forces to the probability of being defeated in detail.

In this uncertainty, Ney sent a message by General Count Flahaut, who happened to be still with him, and who was returning to rejoin Napoleon wherever he might be found, expressive of his anxiety to learn the result of the action of the preceding day. In the meantime, he kept his troops in a state of perfect quietude; his main body was posted in reserve on the Heights of Frasne, between which and the outposts there were intermediate columns of support; but no movement whatever was attempted.

== Advances by Napoleon and Ney ==
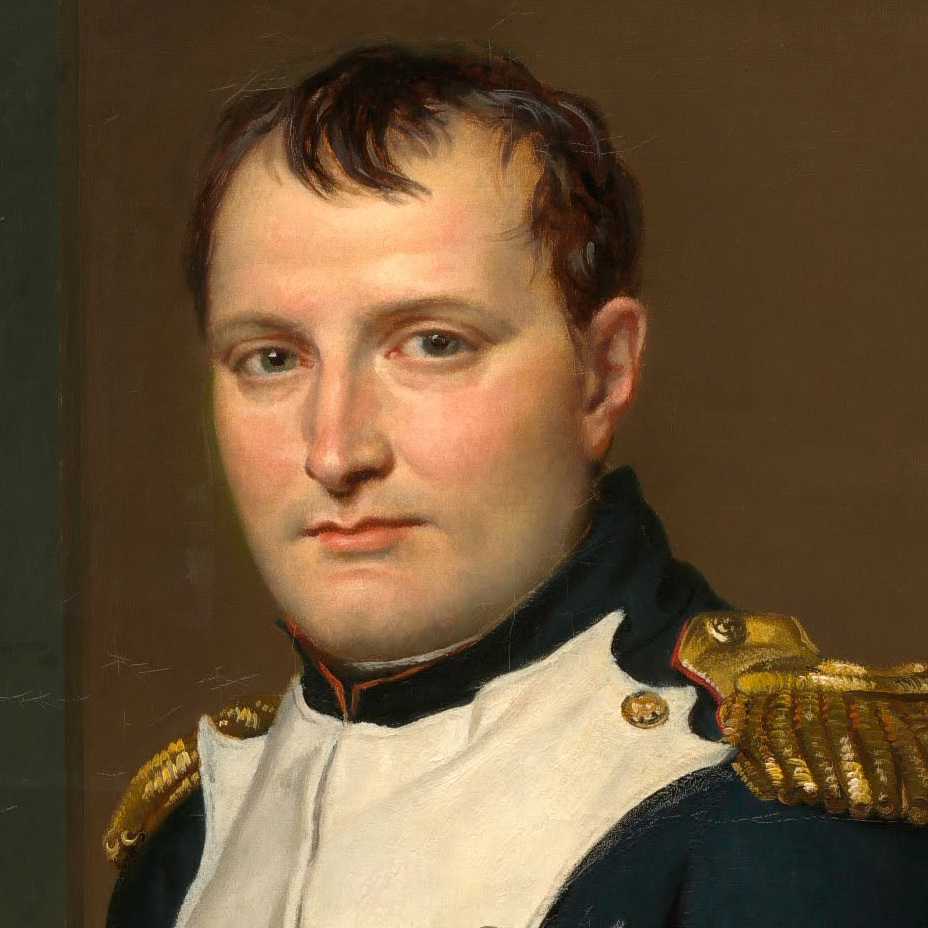
Napoleon Bonaparte by Jacques-Louis David (1812).

Ney at length received the information he had solicited, in a despatch from Marshal Soult, wherein the result of the Battle of Ligny was briefly described. It also stated that Napoleon was proceeding, with the principal portion of his forces, to the Mill of Bry, close to which the high road leads from Namur to Quatre Bras, and that therefore it would not be practicable for the Anglo-allied army to act against him (Ney); but that, should such a case happen, the Emperor would march directly upon it by that road, while Ney should attack it in front, and in this manner that army would at once be destroyed. The despatch required from Ney a report of the exact position of his forces, and an account of all that was going on in his front.

Hence it is evident that Ney's opinion, that a victory at Ligny ought to be followed up by a combined attack upon Wellington, perfectly coincided with Napoleon's views. The military historian William Siborne states that while Ney was thus justified in remaining inactive during the early part of the day, the fact of Napoleon's not moving directly upon Genappe with the morning's dawn, and his excessive delay in breaking up his bivouac at Ligny, are inexplicable. A glorious opportunity had presented itself for the attainment of his original design of defeating both Armies in detail, but which was completely lost by a most extraordinary and fatal want of energy and vigour in seizing upon the advantages which the victory of Ligny had placed within his reach.

Ney, having ascertained that Napoleon's forces were in motion, had commenced the advance of his own troops, when a second despatch reached him, dated, "in front of Ligny, at noon", intimating that Napoleon had just posted a corps of infantry and the Imperial Guard in advance of Marbais, that he wished him to attack the Anglo-allied army at Quatre Bras, and force Wellington from his position; and that his operations would be seconded by the corps at Marbais, to which point Napoleon was proceeding in person.

Upon discovering that the Anglo-allied Infantry had retired, and that the troops around, and in rear of, Quatre Bras, consisted of cavalry covering the retreat, Ney brought forward his own cavalry in advance, and appeared to regulate its movements so that its attack might be directed against the front of the British simultaneously with that of the cavalry which he now perceived advancing along the Namur road against its flank.

About this time, the 10th Hussars were moved across the Namur road, and down the slope in front where they were halted, in echelon of squadrons; and while they were thus posted, Wellington and his Staff came to the front of the regiment. From this spot Wellington was attentively watching, through his telescope, the dispositions and movements of the French, whom he could discover as soon as they reached the Quatre Bras side of Little Marbais; when all at once at a distance of about 3.2 kilometres (2 mi), masses were seen forming on the side of the Namur road, conspicuously glittering in the sun's rays; by which Wellington was at first induced to believe that they were infantry, whose bayonets were so brilliantly reflected; but it was soon discovered that they were French cuirassiers.

After a short time, these were observed to advance, preceded by Lancers, and it was not long before the pickets of the 18th Hussars, posted on that road, began skirmishing, as did also the picket of the 10th Hussars, more in the front of the position, and likewise, still further to the right, in front of Quatre Bras, a picket consisting of a squadron of the British 11th Light Dragoons (Sleigh's), detached from the 4th Cavalry Brigade (Vandeleur's). The 10th Hussars then fell back again into their proper place in the line. 6th Cavalry Brigade (Vivian's) now took up a new alignment, moving back its left so as to present a front to the advancing French, and to protect the left of the position. Vandeleur's brigade was then in right rear of Vivian's and close to Quatre Bras.

== Retreat of the Anglo-allied cavalry ==
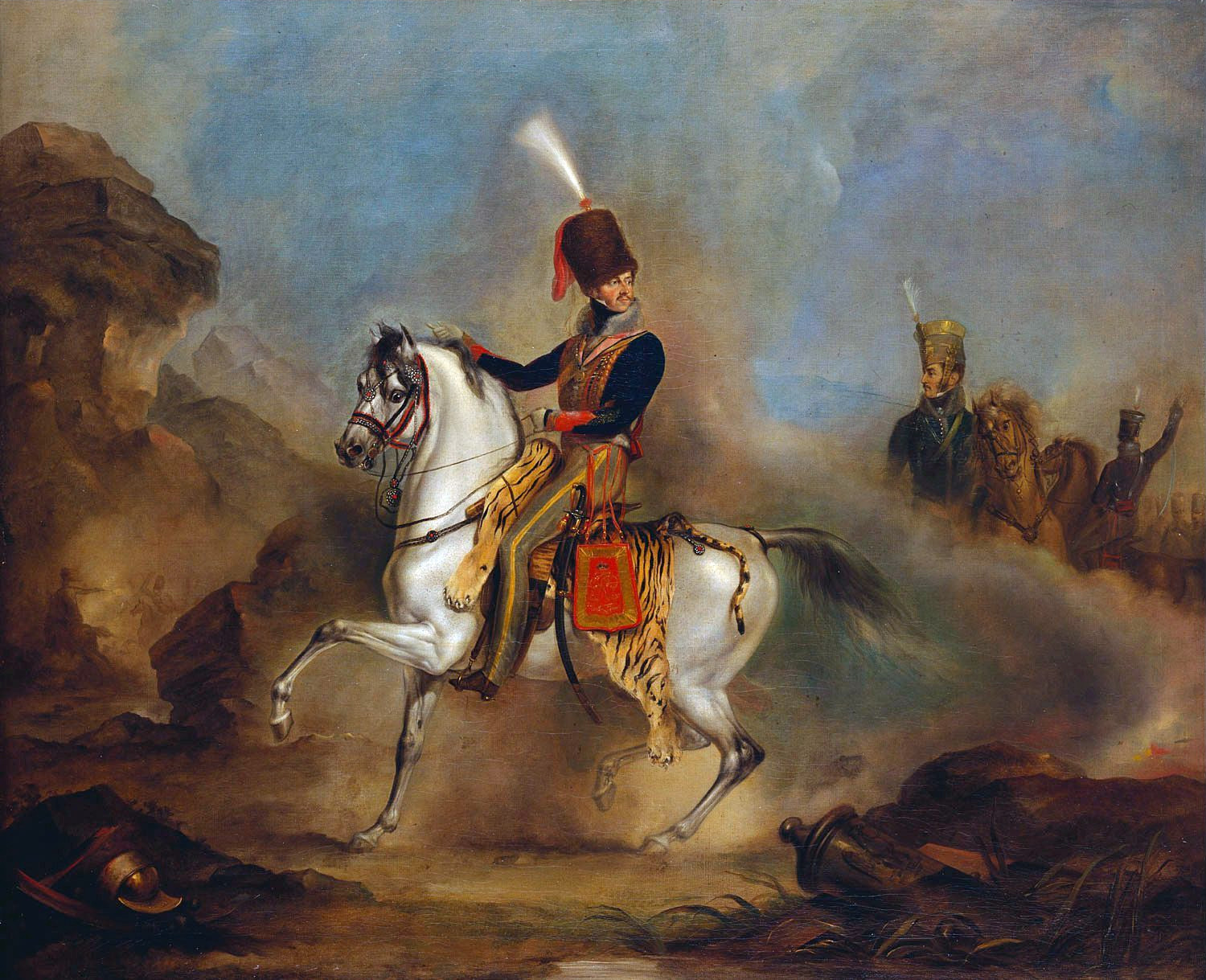
Earl of Uxbridge by Peter Stroehling (c. 1812)

The Anglo-allied infantry having, some time previously, entirely crossed the Dyle, (Note: Both the Ferraris van kaart of 1777 and Siborne calls this stream (or "small river") the Geneppe and what is now the Thyle the Dyle. However in the 19th century some contemporary sources noted that Geneppe was also called the Dyle, and today the Thyle is considered the tributary, and the Geneppe is now considered to be an upstream part of the Dyle.) with the exception of the light companies of the 2nd Brigade of Guards (Byng's) on the right, and of the 1st Battalion 95th Rifles, on the left, which troops had been directed to remain until the last moment, and were now retiring to Genappe (where they were subsequently drawn up at the entrance of the town).

Wellington having satisfied himself that a formidable body of the French cavalry was endeavouring to fall upon him and to molest his retreat, it became a question for Wellington, at that moment, how far it might be advisable to offer any serious resistance to their advance; but Lieutenant General the Earl of Uxbridge, the Commander of the Anglo-allied cavalry, having remarked that, considering the defiles in the rear, and the distance to which the great mass of the infantry had already retired and from which it could offer no immediate support, he did not think the cavalry was favourably situated for making such an attempt, a view which Wellington agreed, and requested Uxbridge at once to organise the retreat of the cavalry.

=== Three Anglo-allied cavalry columns ===
Uxbridge immediately made the following dispositions for this purpose: (Note: Left, right and centre are viewed from the destination of Waterloo so the left column is to the east of the centre column.)

- The Household Brigade of Heavy Cavalry (Somerset's), together with the Union Brigade of Heavy Cavalry (William Ponsonby's), and the British 7th Hussars (Kernison's, formed the centre column, which was to retire by the Brussels high road.
- The left column (to the east of the central column) was formed by Vandeleur's and Vivian's brigades, which was to effect its retreat by a bridge over the Dyle at Thy, (Note: William Siborne and other 19th century historians such as George Hooper call it Thuy, but this does not appear on modern maps or on Ferraris van kaart of 1777 (which places the next bridge downstream from Ways (Wais-le-Hutte) at a hamlet called Thy), so it is likely that the bridge at Thuy were the bridges at the hamlet next to the Château de Thy, 4–8 Rue de Thy 1470 Genappe (50.61113°N 4.48392°E).) still lower down the stream than that by which Alten's infantry division had crossed.
- The right column was formed by two regiments of the 3rd Light Cavalry Brigade (Dörnberg's,(the other the British 23rd Light Dragoons (Earl of Portarlington's) was employed as a portion of the rearguard of the centre column); and the British 15th Hussars (Dalrymple's). This column was to pass the Dyle by a ford higher up the stream than the town of Genappe.

The British 7th Hussars and 15th Hussars were detached from the 5th Cavalry Brigade (Grant's). The 5th's remaining regiment, the 2nd Hussars of the King's German Legion (Linsingen's), was manning a line of observation posts on the French frontier, extending from Kortrijk (Courtrai), through Menen (Menin), Ypres, Lo (Loo), and Veurne (Furnes) to the North Sea.

=== Initial skirmishes ===
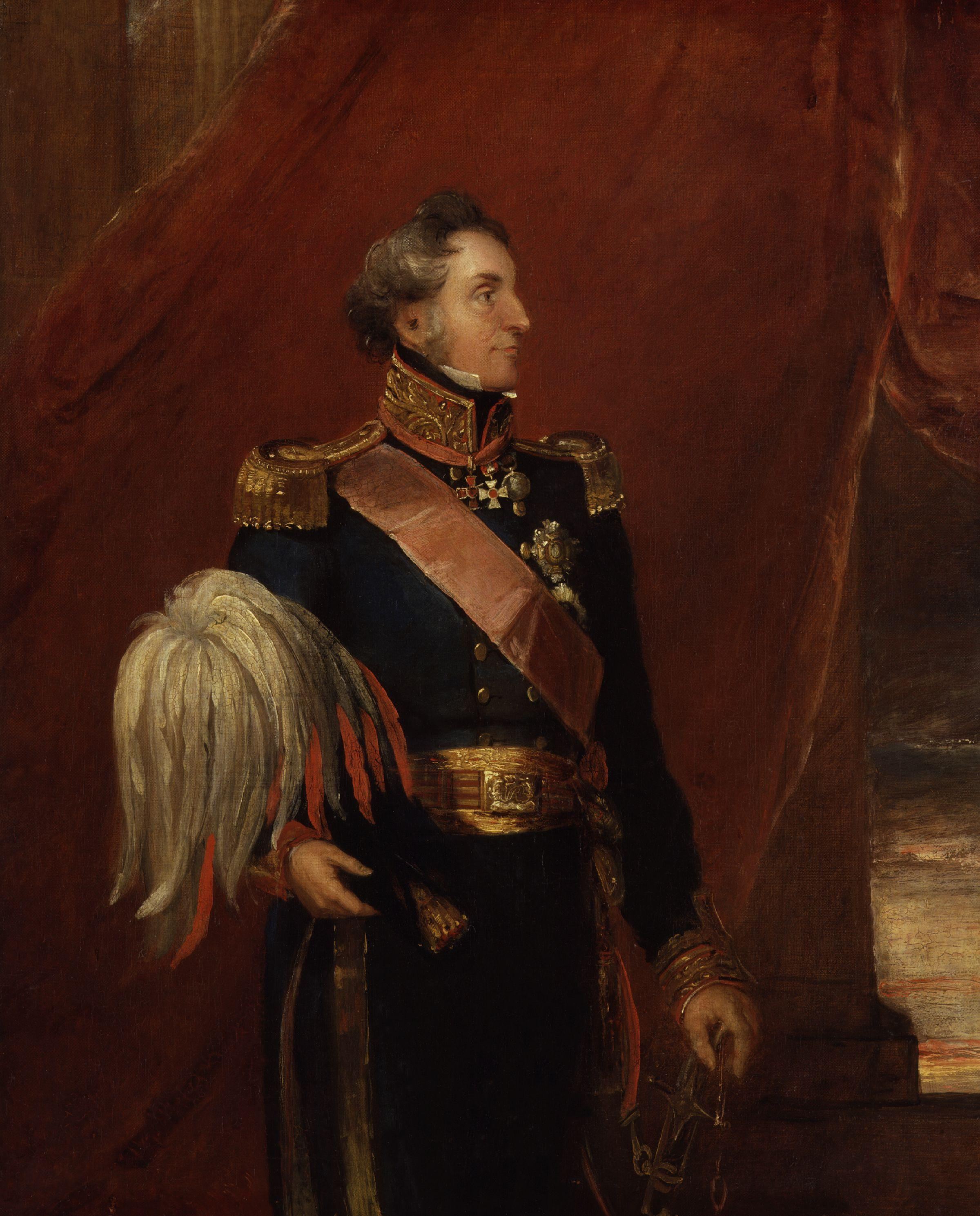
Lord Vivian by William Salter.

These dispositions had scarcely been arranged, when the picket of the 18th Hussars, on the left, came in at a good round trot, followed by two or three squadrons of French cavalry, upon which Vivian's Battery of Horse Artillery (Frazer's), opened a fire whereby their advance was checked. The French, however, brought up their own artillery, which soon opened upon the Hussar Brigade. Vivian, having received Uxbridge's instructions to retire, accompanied with an intimation that he would be supported by Vandeleur's Brigade, then in his rear, and observing that the French cavalry was pressing forward in great numbers, not only in his front, but also on his flank, he put his Brigade about, and retired in line, covered by the skirmishers.

The French followed, with loud cries of "Vive l'Empereur!" and just as the Vivian's Brigade reached a sort of hollow, the French guns again opened, throwing shells, which mostly flew over the heads of the 18th Hussars, against which regiment they appeared to be principally directed. In the meantime, Vandeleur's Brigade had been drawn up in support, on rather a commanding position, and Vivian approached it in the full expectation that it would open out for the passing through of his own men, and take the rearguard in its turn; but on the Hussars arriving within about 50 metres (55 yd) of the 4th Brigade, Vandeleur put it about, and retired — Vivian not being aware that Vandeleur had previously received orders to retire and leave the road clear for the retreat of the cavalry in his front Vivian immediately occupied the ground thus vacated, and, with a view to check the French advance more effectually, ordered the 18th Hussars to charge, as soon as the French approached within favourable reach.

The weather, during the morning, had become oppressively hot; it was now a dead calm; not a leaf was stirring; and the atmosphere was close to an intolerable degree; while a dark, heavy, dense cloud impended over the combatants. The 18th Hussars were fully prepared, and awaited but the command to charge, when the Brigade guns on the right commenced firing, for the purpose of previously disturbing and breaking the order of the French advance. The concussion seemed instantly to rebound through the still atmosphere, and communicate, as an electric spark, with the heavily charged mass above. A most awfully loud thunder clap burst forth, immediately succeeded by a rain which has never, probably, been exceeded in violence even within the tropics.

In a very few minutes the ground became perfectly saturated; so much so that it was quite impracticable for any rapid movement of the cavalry. The French Lancers, opposed to the British 6th Brigade (Johnstone's), began to relax in their advance, and to limit it to skirmishing; but they seemed more intent upon endeavouring to envelope, and intercept the retreat of, the Hussars.

Vivian now replaced the 18th Hussars by the 1st Hussars of the King's German Legion, as rearguard, with orders to cover well the left flank and left front of the Brigade. He had already sent off his battery of horse artillery, to cross the Dyle by the bridge at Thy, and despatched an aide-de-camp to Vandeleur, to request he would move his brigade as quickly as possible across that bridge, so that he might meet with no interruption in his retreat, in the event of his being hard pressed.

The Anglo-allied columns experienced little serious molestation in their retreat to the Dyle and while on the French side of the Dyle: large bodies of French cavalry were seen in motion, their advanced guards limited their attacks to skirmishing.

=== Retreat of the left cavalry column ===
The Anglo-allied left cavalry column continued its retreat, which was towards the little bridge at Thy, by deep narrow lanes, converted by the tremendous downpour of rain into streams.

==== Skirmishing at the bridge at Thy ====
Vivian withdrew the 10th and 18th Hussars from the position he last occupied, but on their approaching the Dyle an interruption occurred in consequence of Vandeleur's Brigade not having effected its passage across the bridge; and the delay became so great that he was induced to put about the 18th Hussars, with a view to their affording a support to the 1st Hussars of the King's German Legion, should they require it.

In a short time after this, Vandeleur's Brigade resumed its progress: the 10th Hussars followed; and, as the 1st Hussars, with which regiment Vivian himself was at the moment, continued to maintain a vigorous and effective skirmish, he ordered the 18th to resume its retreat; having previously directed that some men of the 10th Hussars should be dismounted on reaching the opposite bank of the Dyle, and be prepared with their carbines to defend the passage, should the retreat of the remainder of the Brigade be severely pressed.

After skirmishing some time, Vivian despatched a squadron of the 1st Hussars of the King's German Legion to the bridge, and the moment he began to do so, the French cavalry again pushed forward with so much boldness and rapidity as to interpose between the left squadron and the main body of the regiment, (lucky for them the squadron found a sunken lane and a second bridge downstream from the bridge over which the rest of the brigade passed). Having ascertained that all was ready, Vivian galloped down the road to the bridge with the remainder of the 1st Hussars of the King's German Legion.

The French followed the rapidly retreating German Hussars, loudly cheering, but as soon as the Hussars cleared the bridge, and the French Dragoons reached it, some of the dismounted men that had been formed along the top of the opposite bank, in rear of a hedge, overlooking the bridge and a hollow way, through which the road led from it up the ascent, opened a fire upon the foremost of the French Lancers that had come up to the other end of the bridge, while the remainder of the 10th, and the whole of the 18th Hussars, were drawn up along the rising ground or bank. The good countenance here shown by Vivian's Brigade, combined with the soft and miry state of the ground after the thunderstorm had set in, completely checked the pursuit by the French cavalry, which now turned towards the high road.

==== Retreat of the left cavalry column to Waterloo ====
The left cavalry column, after Vivian's Brigade had remained in its position for some little time, continued its retreat without further molestation (the French having contented himself with merely detaching a patrol to watch its movements) along a narrow cross road, running nearly parallel with the Charleroi high road, and leading through the Villages of Glabais, Maransart, Aywiers, Frischermont (Note: Frischermont, a hamlet and châteaux near Papelotte destined to be garrisoned the next day during the Battle of Waterloo by Anglo-allied soldiers) Smohain, and Vert-Coucou. (Note: Verd-Cocou (Kaart van Ferraris (1777))—now Vert-Coucou, a larger suburb—was a hamlet located 1.3 kilometres (0.81 mi) north-east of Mont-Saint-Jean in the triangle of land where the roads now called Rue Victor Hugo and Chaussée de Louvain converge (50.69693°N 4.42078°E).) Here Vivian's Brigade arrived in the evening, in the vicinity of the Forest of Soignies, and bivouacked; while Vandeleur's Brigade passed the night somewhat nearer to the ground which had been selected for the position to be taken up by the Anglo-allied army.

=== Right cavalry column over the ford to Waterloo ===
The Right Cavalry Column, consisting only, as previously stated, of the 1st and 2nd Light Dragoons of the King's German Legion, and of the British 15th Hussars, effected its retreat in good order, protected by its skirmishers, as far as the ford, which it crossed above Genappe. At this point, the French cavalry suspended its pursuit, and proceeded, in the manner as that on the right had done, to join the main body on the high road; while the British right cavalry column continued its retreat unmolested towards the position of Waterloo, in rear of which it bivouacked.

=== Retreat of the centre column ===
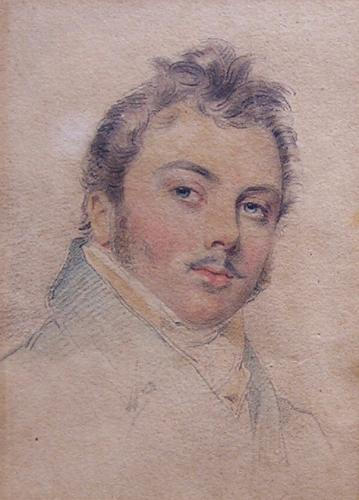
Major Edward Hodge of the 7th Hussars by the English School (circa 1815)

Of the centre column, the Heavy Brigades (Sommerset's and Ponsonby's) had retired along the Charleroi road, and were taking up a position on some high ground, a little in rear of Genappe, on either side of that road. The detached squadron of the 11th light Dragoons (under Captain Schbeiber), was withdrawn and directed to retire through the above town. The 23rd light Dragoons were also withdrawn, and posted upon the ascent between Genappe and the position occupied by the two Heavy Brigades. The 7th Hussars continued on the south side of Dyle, as the rearguard.

At length the 7th Hussars retired through Genappe, after having thrown out their 8th squadron, commanded by Major Hodge, as rearguard, to cover the retreat of the centre column, regulating its proceedings in conformity with such orders as it might receive from Major General Sir William Dörnberg, who had been ordered to superintend the movements of the skirmishers. Major Hodge led out the 8th Troop, under Captain Elphinstone, to skirmish, while Lieutenant Standish O'Grady, who commanded the Left Troop, held the high road, from which he had occasionally to send assistance to the former, and frequently to advance, to enable the skirmishers to hold their ground, as their movements were difficult, through ploughed fields so soft that the horses always sank up to their knees, and sometimes to their girths. In this manner, every inch of ground was disputed, until within a short distance of Genappe.

Once the rearguard was a short distance of Genappe, Dörnberg informed Lieutenant O'Grady that he must leave him; and that it was of the utmost importance to face the French boldly at this spot, as the bridge in the town of Genappe was so narrow that the squadron would have to pass it in file; that he was to endeavour as much as possible to obtain time for drawing off the skirmishers, but not to compromise his troop too much.

Lieutenant O'Grady then called in his skirmishers, and advanced with his own troop boldly up the road at a trot. The French cavalry immediately opposed to him, went about, followed by him for some distance; and he thus continued alternately advancing and retiring, until he saw all the 8th Troop safe on the road in his rear. He then began to retire at a walk, occasionally halting and fronting, until he turned the comer of the town of Genappe: when he filed the men from the left, and passed through the place at a gallop. Upon the arrival of the Squadron at the opposite entrance of Genappe, it was posted between this point and the main body of the 7th Hussars, which had been drawn up on the road in a column of divisions, prepared to check the advance of the French on their debouching from the town.

==== Action at Genappe ====
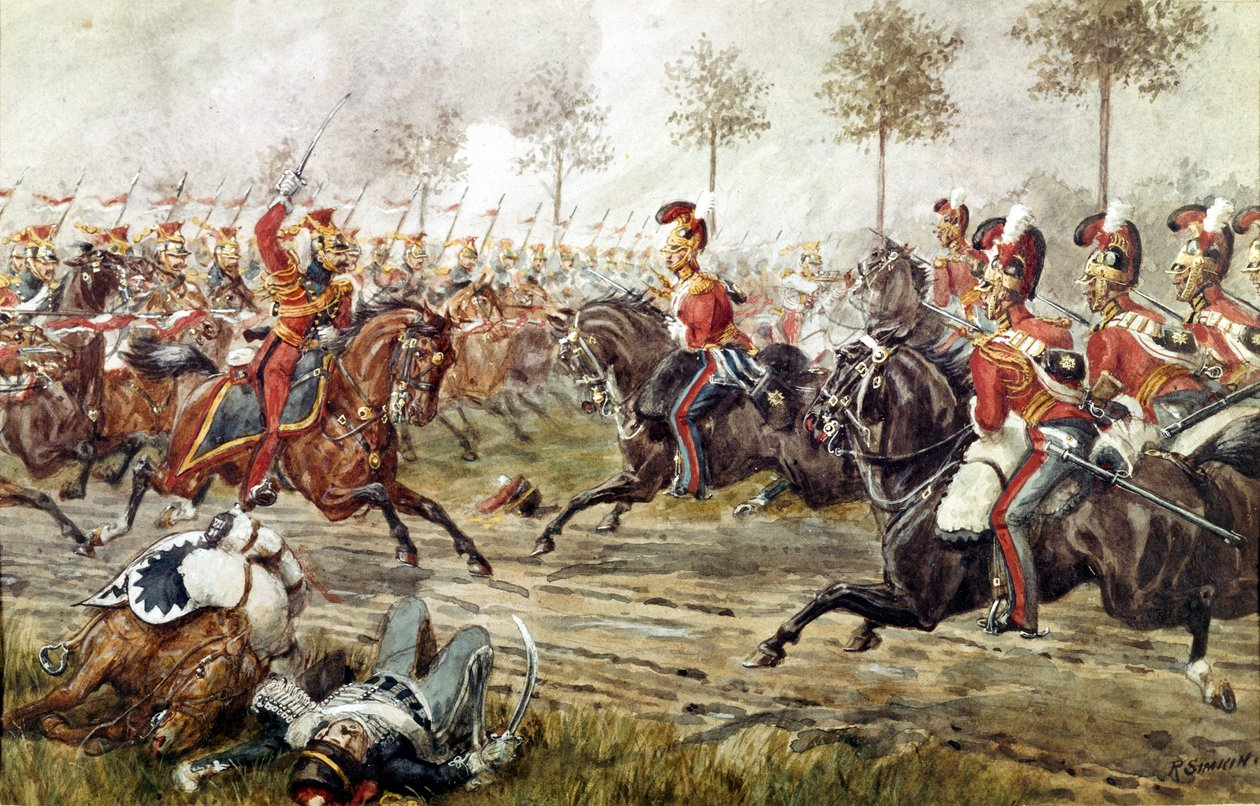
The 1st Life Guards charging the 2nd Light Cavalry Lancers Regiment at Genappe

A large body of French cavalry, consisting of from sixteen to eighteen squadrons, was now entering Genappe by the Charleroi road, followed by the main body of the French Army under Napoleon. Uxbridge, the commander of the British cavalry, wanted to check the French advance and gain sufficient time for the orderly retreat of the Anglo-allied army as well as to prevent a compromise of any portion of the rearmost troops. As a result, he embraced the advantage that the narrow defile of Genappe seemed to present.

The town consisted mainly of houses lining the high road, on the Brussels side of the bridge. The road then ascended a ridge, the brow of which was about 600 metres (660 yd) distant. Here, Uxbridge halted the Heavy Brigades (Somerset's and Ponsonby's), and posted them so as to cover the retirement of the light cavalry. At first, he formed them in line; Somerset's on the right, and Ponsonby's on the left of the high road but observing the formidable advance of the French, and that the light cavalry would soon be compelled to fall back, Uxbridge drew up Somerset's Brigade in a column of half squadrons upon and close to the right of the road itself, so as to admit of troops retiring by its left; and formed Ponsonby's Brigade into a column of half squadrons to the left of the high road, and somewhat to the rear. The 7th Hussars were formed at some little distance in the rear of Genappe, and the 23rd Light Dragoons were drawn up in support of that Regiment, and about midway between it and the heavy cavalry on the height. The squadron of the 7th Hussars, under Major Hodge, halted between the main body of that Regiment and the town of Genappe.

Thus posted, the centre retiring cavalry column remained about twenty minutes, when loud shouts announced that the French had entered the town. Presently a few horsemen appeared galloping out of the street, and dashed at speed into Major Hodge's Squadron, They were found, on being captured, to be quite inebriated. In a few moments afterwards, the French column showed its head within the town; the leading troop consisted of lancers, all very young men, mounted on very small horses, and commanded by a fine looking, and, as it subsequently transpired, a very brave man.

The column remained about fifteen minutes within the town, its head halted at the outlet facing the Anglo-allied rearguard, and its flanks protected by the houses. The street not being straight, and the rear of the column not being aware that the front had halted, continued pressing forward, until the whole mass became so jammed that it was impossible for the foremost ranks to go about, should such a movement become necessary.

===== Unsuccessful charge of the British 7th Hussars =====
The apparent hesitation and indecision of the French induced Uxbridge, who stood upon some elevated ground adjoining the right of the road, to order the 7th Hussars to charge.

The latter, animated by the presence of the commander of the cavalry, who was also their own Colonel, rushed forward with the most determined spirit and intrepidity; while the French, awaiting the onslaught, opposed to them a close, compact, and impenetrable phalanx of lances; which, being securely flanked by the houses, and backed by a solid mass of horsemen, presented a complete chevaux de frise. Hence, it is not surprising that the 7th Hussars charge should have made no impression upon the French; nevertheless, the contest was maintained for some considerable time; with the Hussars cutting at their opponents, and the latter parrying and thrusting, and neither party giving way. Both the commanding officer of the Lancers, and Major Hodge, commanding the leading squadron of the Hussars, were killed, gallantly fighting to the last.

The French had by this time established a battery of horse artillery on the opposite bank of the Dyle to left of Genappe, from which they opened a brisk fire upon the British cavalry in support, and several shot struck the main body of the 7th Hussars, upsetting men and horses, and causing great impediments in their rear.

The French Lancers now advanced, and drove the 7th Hussars upon their reserve; but here the 7th rallied, renewed their attack, and forced the Lancers back upon the town. The latter having been reinforced, rallied, in their turn, and drove back the Hussars. These, however, again rallied, and resolutely faced their opponents, with whom they continued a fierce encounter for some time longer, without being productive of any favourable result, but in which the bravery of the 7th Hussars shone most conspicuously, and became the theme of admiration of all who witnessed it.

Upon receiving orders from Uxbridge the Hussars went about and attempted to disengage. However the French Lancers pursued the Hussars and in the mêlée which followed both sides lost about the same number of men. When at length the 7th Hussars were able to disengage they retired through the 23rd Light Dragoons, took the first favourable turn off the road and reformed in the adjoining field.

A battery of British horse artillery had taken post close to a house on the height occupied by the heavy cavalry, and on the left of the road; and it was now replying to the French battery on the opposite bank of the river.

===== French cavalry advance out of Genappe =====
During this contest, the French, having become sensible of the evil that might arise from the closely wedged state of the cavalry in the town, began to clear the rear of the most advanced portions of the column, so as to admit of more freedom of movement in case of disaster.

So elated were the French with having repulsed the 7th Hussars in their first serious encounter with the British cavalry, that immediately on that Regiment retiring, the whole column that was in Genappe raised the war cry, and rent the air with shouts of "En avent! — En avant!". evincing the greatest impatience to follow up this momentary advantage, and to attack the supports; for which, indeed, the opportunity appeared very favourable, as the ranks of the latter were suffering considerable annoyance from the well directed and effective fire of the French guns on the opposite bank of the river.

The French now abandoned the secure cover to which they had been indebted for their temporary success, and were advancing up the ascent with all the confidence of a fancied superiority, and started to advance up the hill out of Genappe.

===== 1st Life Guards charge through Genappe =====
Uxbridge, seizing upon the advantage presented for attacking the French cavalry while moving up hill, with their flanks unsupported, and a narrow defile of the town and its bridge in their rear, brought forward 1st Life Guards through the 23rd Light Dragoons, who opened out for their passage to the front. The Life Guards now made their charge, most gallantly headed by Colonel Sir John Elley, Deputy Adjutant General, who, at the moment of contact with the French, began by cutting down two men right and left. It was truly a splendid charge; its rapid rush down into the mass of French cavalry, was as terrific in appearance as it was destructive in its effect; for although the French met the attack with firmness, they were utterly unable to hold their ground a single moment, were overthrown with great slaughter, and literally ridden down in such a manner that the road was instantaneously covered with men and horses, scattered in all directions. The Life Guards, pursuing their victorious course, dashed into Genappe, and drove all before them as far as the opposite outlet of the town.

===== Aftermath of the action at Genappe =====
This eminently successful charge made a deep impression upon the French, who now conducted their pursuit with extreme caution. The 23rd Light Dragoons, which had supported the 1st Life Guards in their charge, became again the last regiment in the rearguard, and continued so during the remainder of the retreat. Ponsonby's Brigade had deployed to the right of the high road, and the guns were so disposed as to take advantageous positions, retiring en échiquier.

The French, having recaptured Genappe and advanced back up the slope out of Genappe, tried to get upon the flanks of the centre retiring column, chiefly upon the right flank; but the Royals, Greys, and Inniskillings, manoeuvred beautifully; retiring by alternate squadrons, and covered by their own skirmishers, who completely beat the French light cavalry in that kind of warfare.

Finding that from the deep state of the ground, there was not the least danger of his being turned by the enemy, Uxbridge gradually withdrew Ponsonby's Brigade to the high road. He kept the light cavalry, protected by the Household Brigade, as the rearguard, and slowly retired into the chosen position in front of Waterloo, the guns and rockets constantly plying on the French advanced guard, which, although it pressed forward twice or thrice, and made preparations to attack, never ventured to come to close quarters with its opponents; and the column received from it no further molestation.

Napoleon detached the 3rd Cavalry Division (Domon's), from his main line of advance to reconnoitre the country to the east (between the high road to Brussels and the Dyle). The 4th Regiment of Chasseurs (Desmichels') pushed as far as the bridge at Mousty, (Note: 50.66077°N 4.56664°E Sliborne calls it "Bridge of Moustier", while the Kaart van Ferraris call the area Moustier and includes the bridge (at it current location) and the nearby Church of Notre-Dame de Mousty) on which line its skirmishers exchanged a few carbine shots with some Prussian dragoons, who did not, however, appear willing to engage further with them. It was by means of this reconnaissance that Napoleon ascertained the retreat, through Tilly and Gentinnes, of the principal Prussian column, consisting of I and II Corps (Zieten's and Pirch's), although the line by which they retired was undiscovered by Grouchy (on 17 June), in whose immediate sphere of operations it was situated.

== Waterloo ==
=== Picton cannonades French infantry ===
On arriving at the foot of the Anglo-allied position, the 23rd Light Dragoons moved off to the (Allied) right of the high road, and into the hollow in which lies the orchard of the Farm of La Haye Sainte. Here they were drawn up, prepared to meet the French advanced guard, should it follow them, or to fall upon its flank, should it venture to continue its march along the road. The latter, however, halted upon the height which intervenes between La Haye Sainte and La Belle Alliance, and opened a fire upon the centre of Wellington's line, above the former farm, from two batteries of horse artillery.

Picton, who was then upon the rising ground in rear of La Haye Sainte, and who was intently watching the French advance along the high road, perceived columns of infantry advancing from La Belle Alliance. He immediately took upon himself to unite the two Batteries nearest at hand, which were those under Major Lloyd of the British Artillery, and Major Cleeves of the King's German Legion (although not belonging to his own Division), and to place them in position on the high ground close to the Charleroi road. The guns immediately opened a brisk cannonade upon the French columns, of which they had obtained a most accurate range just as their leading divisions had entered the enclosed space between the high banks which line the high road where it is cut through the heights intervening between La Belle Alliance and La Haye Sainte.

This mass of French infantry suffered severely from the fire, to which it stood exposed about half an hour; for the head of the column having been unable to retreat, in consequence of the pressure from its rear, and prevented by the high bank on either side of the road from filing off to a flank, could not readily extricate itself from so embarrassing a situation. During the whole of this fire, the Allied Batteries were replied to, though very ineffectually, by the two batteries of French horse artillery posted on the heights in question.

=== Cavalry skirmishing ===
It at twilight: the approaching darkness was greatly accelerated by the lowering aspect of the sky. Pickets were hastily thrown forward by both armies, and to so great a height had the mutual spirit of defiance arisen, that the near approach of opposing parties, advancing to take up their ground for the night, led to little cavalry skirmishes, which, though unproductive of any useful result to either side, were distinguished, on different points of the lines, by a chivalrous bravery which seemed to require a prudent restraint.

In one of these affairs, Captain Heyuger of the 7th Hussars, made a very brilliant charge with his troop; and when Wellington sent to check him, Wellington desired to be made acquainted with the name of an officer who had displayed so much gallantry. A very spirited charge was also made by the right troop of the 2nd Light Dragoons of the King's German Legion, under Lieutenant Hugo; who was allowed by his commanding officer to volunteer for that service, and who, from the vicinity of Hougomont, boldly rushed up the Height intervening between that point and Mon Plaisir, and drove back a portion of the French advanced guard of cavalry; recapturing at the same time three carriages filled with British sick and wounded.

== Wellington secures his right flank ==
Wellington who had, from the commencement of the campaign, considered it very possible that Napoleon would advance by the Mons road, still entertained apprehensions of an attempt on the part of his opponent to turn him by Hal, and seize Brussels by a coup de main. For this, however, he was fully prepared, having made his dispositions for the security of that flank, in the manner pointed out in the following instructions, which he issued to Major General Sir Charles Colville

17th June 1815.
The Army retired this day from its position at Quatre Bras to its present position in front of Waterloo.
The Brigades of the 4th Division, at Braine le Comte, are to retire at daylight tomorrow morning upon Hal.
Major General Colville must be guided by the intelligence he receives of the Enemy's movements in his march to Hal, whether he moves by the direct route or by Enghien.
Prince Frederick of Orange is to occupy with his Corps the position between Hal and Enghien, and is to defend it as long as possible.
The Army will probably continue in its position in front of Waterloo tomorrow.
Lieutenant Colonel Torrens will inform Lieutenant General Sir Charles Colville of the position and situation of the armies.

== Blücher promises his support ==
In the course of the evening, Wellington received from Blücher a reply to the request he had made for his support in the position he was now occupying. It was highly characteristic of the old man, who had written it, in the following terms, without previously conferring with, or addressing himself to any one:

I shall not come with two Corps only, but with my whole army; upon this understanding, however, that should the French not attack us on the 18th, we shall attack them on the 19th.

== Bivouacs and rain ==
The respective lines of pickets and vedettes had scarcely been taken up along the low ground that skirted the front of the Anglo-allied position, and the last gun had just boomed from the heights, when loud thunder accompanied by vivid flashes of lightning, i^in peeled forth in solemn and awful grandeur; while the rain, pouring down in torrents, imparted the utmost gloom and discomfort to the bivouacs, which the opposing armies had established for the night, upon the ground destined to become the famous battle field of Waterloo.

== Analysis ==
=== Remarks upon the retreat to Waterloo ===
In the opinion of the military historian William Siborne writing eight decades after the events, the manner in which Wellington withdrew his army from the position of Quatre Bras to the one of Waterloo, must ever render that retreat a perfect model of operations of this nature, performed in the immediate presence of a powerful enemy. Those dispositions which have been described as having been made by him for the purpose of masking the retirement of the main body, of affording perfect security to the passage of the defile of Genappe in his rear, and of ensuring the orderly and regular assembly of the several corps on the ground respectively allotted to them in the new position, evince altogether a degree of skill which had never been surpassed.

In such operations, the covering of the Army by its cavalry and light troops necessarily forms an important feature; and a glance at the manner in which this duty was fulfilled by Uxbridge, with the cavalry, horse artillery, and a few light battalions of infantry, at his disposal, is sufficient to show that the exemplification of such feature on this occasion was exceedingly beautiful. Indeed, so orderly and so perfect were all the arrangements connected with this retreat, from its commencement to its close, that the movements partook more of the appearance of a field day upon a large scale, than of an operation executed in the actual presence of an enemy; and this was particularly observable as regarded the protection afforded by the cavalry and horse artillery, which manoeuvred to admiration, and in a style that, combined with the brilliant charge by the 1st Life Guards at Genappe, evidently impressed the enemy with a due sense of the efficiency of the troops immediately to his front. This well conducted retreat had also inspired the British and German portion of the cavalry, and given them confidence in their senior commanders' abilities.

=== Napoleon's error ===
As described above, after the fighting at Quatre Bras the two opposing commanders Ney and Wellington initially held their ground while they obtained information about what had happened at the larger Battle of Ligny.

Archibald Frank Beck the author of the Encyclopedia Britannica Eleventh Edition article on the campaign states that with the defeat of the Prussians Napoleon still had the initiative, for Ney's failure to take the Quatre Bras cross roads had actually placed the Anglo-allied army in a precarious position. Ney, reinforced by D'Erlon's fresh corps, lay in front of Wellington, and Ney could have fastened upon the Anglo-allied army and held it in place during the early morning of 17 June, sufficiently long to allow Napoleon to close round his foe's open left flank and deal him a deathblow.

The manoeuvre did not happen because the French were desultory in the aftermath of Ligny. Napoleon wasted the morning of 17 June by taking a late breakfast and going to see the previous day's battlefield before organising a pursuit of the two Coalition armies.
