= List of protected heritage sites in Villers-la-Ville =

This table shows an overview of the protected heritage sites in the Walloon town Villers-la-Ville. This list is part of Belgium's national heritage.

Object	Year/architect	Town/section	Address	Coordinates	Number^{?}	Image
Ruins Abbey of Villers ^{(nl)} ^{(fr)}		Villers-la-Ville		50.590651°N 4.529844°E	25107-CLT-0001-01 Info	Ruïnes Abdij van Villers
Expansion of the ranking of the site of the ruins of the abbey of Villers-la-Ville ^{(nl)} ^{(fr)}		Villers-la-Ville		50.585337°N 4.514468°E	25107-CLT-0002-01 Info	Uitbreiding klassering van de site van de ruïnes van de abdij van Villers-la-Ville
Facades and roofs of the farm of the old abbey called ferme de la Basse-Cour ^{(nl)} ^{(fr)}		Villers-la-Ville	avenue de Speeckaert n°20	50.585227°N 4.528005°E	25107-CLT-0003-01 Info	Gevels en daken van de boerderij van de oude abdij genaamd ferme de la Basse-Cour
Chapel of Notre-Dame du Triolet Auxiliatrice and environment ^{(nl)} ^{(fr)}		Villers-la-Ville		50.539727°N 4.533413°E	25107-CLT-0005-01 Info	Kapel Notre-Dame Auxiliatrice du Triolet en omgeving
Domaine de la Hutte in the territory of Villers-la-Ville ^{(nl)} ^{(fr)}		Villers-la-Ville		50.537055°N 4.470442°E	25107-CLT-0007-01 Info	
Valley of the Thyle upstream and downstream of the mill Hollers ^{(nl)} ^{(fr)}		Villers-la-Ville		50.573080°N 4.508791°E	25107-CLT-0008-01 Info	
Ruins Abbey of Villers and surrounding area ^{(nl)} ^{(fr)}		Villers-la-Ville		50.590651°N 4.529844°E	25107-PEX-0001-01 Info	Ruïnes Abdij van Villers en omliggend terrein
Expansion of the ranking of the site of the ruins of the abbey of Villers-la-Ville ^{(nl)} ^{(fr)}		Villers-la-Ville		50.585337°N 4.514468°E	25107-PEX-0002-01 Info	

== See also ==
- Lists of protected heritage sites in Walloon Brabant
- Villers-la-Ville
