= Crisóstomo Henríquez =

Spanish Cistercian monk and ecclesiastical historian

Crisóstomo Henríquez (1594 – 23 December 1632) was a Spanish Cistercian monk and ecclesiastical historian, who belonged to the Spanish congregation of that order, and who worked in the Spanish Netherlands.

== Biography ==
=== Early life, education, and career ===
Henríquez was born in Madrid, Spain, in 1594. At the age of 13, after completing his humanities education, he entered the Cistercian Monastery (Abbey) of Santa María de Huerta, Spain, where he received the religious habit, and in 1612 made his monastic profession in 1612. He was then sent by his superiors to various monasteries of the Order, where he studied successively philosophy and theology under the most eminent professors. During his studies he manifested a marked aptitude and taste for historical research. While still a student, he published his first work, the History of the Monastery of Meyra.

Having completed his studies, he returned to Huerta. During this time his parents had left Spain at the court of Archduke Albert VII, Governor of the Habsburg Netherlands, and at their request this prince wrote to the Abbot General of the Cistercian Congregation of Spain to ask that Henríquez be sent to the Low Countries. The Abbot General granted the request, and Henríquez left Spain, never to see it again.

His superiors commanded him to write the history of the Cistercian Order. For this purpose, he visited various Belgian monasteries, especially those of Aulne, Villers, and Our Lady of the Dunes Abbey, consulting their libraries, studying their archives, and seeking all the information obtainable for the realization of his project.

=== Death ===
Henríquez died on 23 December 1632, at Louvain, which is still the location of the Université catholique de Louvain, the leading Catholic university in the Low Countries.

== Reputation and honors ==
Henríquez was considered an exemplary monk from every point of view. His knowledge was allegedly only equaled by his humility and his submission to his superiors unqualified, while his agreeable demeanor won him the affection of all. His superiors were lavish in bestowing on him marks of esteem and honorable titles. He was appointed historian of the Spanish Congregation of the Cistercian Order, afterwards Vicar General of the same Congregation, and finally Grand Prior of the Military Order of Calatrava.

== Works ==
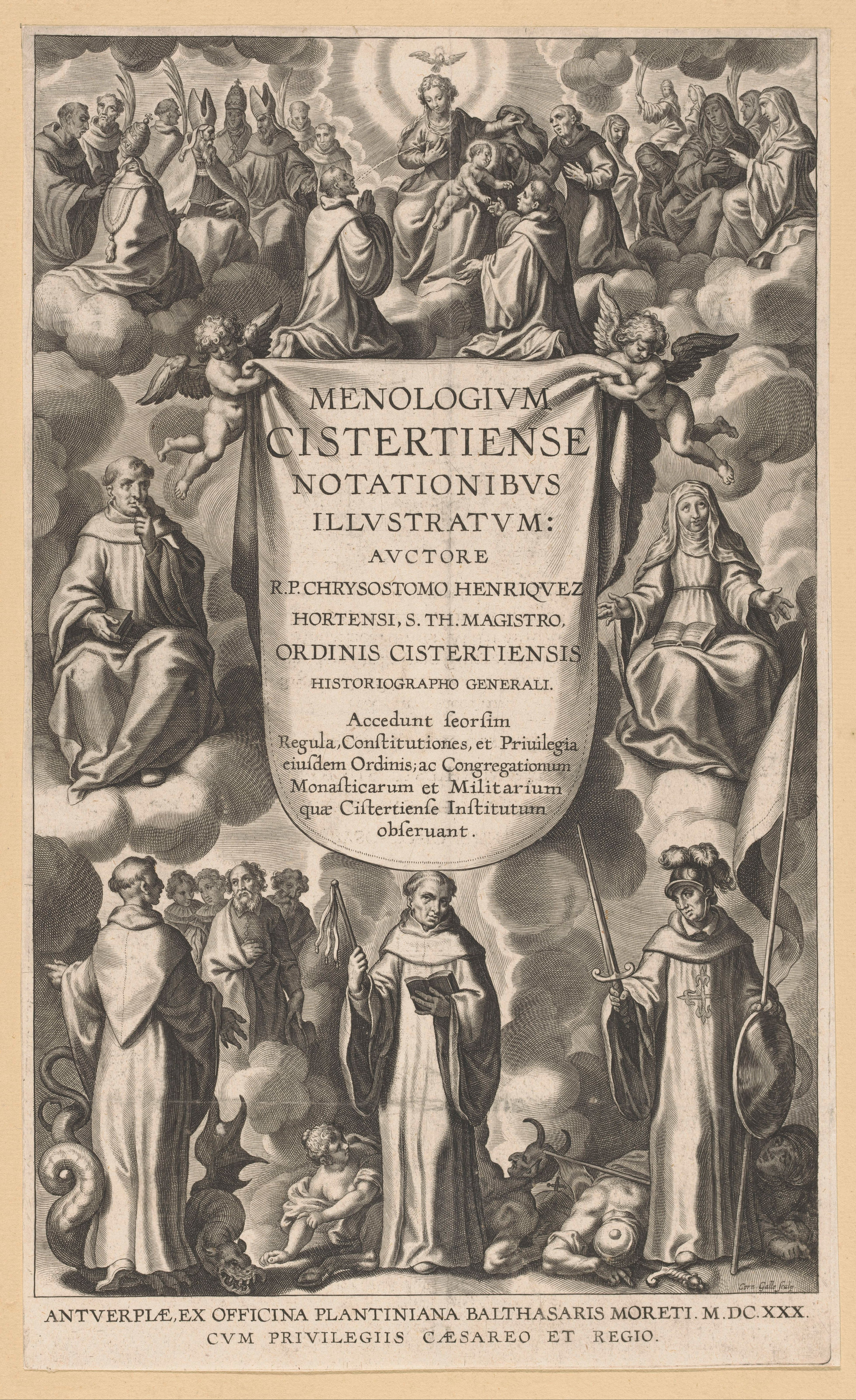
Crisóstomo Henríquez, Menologium Cistertiense Notationibus illustratum, Antwerp, 1630

From 1619 until 1632, he published upwards of 40 separate works in Dutch, Latin, and Spanish, including:

- Thesaurus Evangelicus vel Relatio Illustrium Virorum Ordinis Cisterciensis in Hibernia, about famous Irish Cistercians, which was among his earliest works.
- Sol Cisterciensis in Belgio (History of men remarkable for their virtues and miracles of the Abbey of Villers, so fruitful in saints).
- Fasciculus SS. O. C., in which he recounts the lives of the patriarchs, prelates, abbots, defenders of the Catholic faith, and martyrs of the order, and speaks of the origin of the Military orders.
- Coronae Sacrae O. C. (Sacred Crowns of the Cistercian Order), in which he documents the lives of queens and princesses who had renounced the world in order to take the Cistercian habit.
- Bernardus Immaculatus, in which he explains and justifies the opinion of St. Bernard of Clairvaux concerning the Immaculate Conception of Mary, the sanctification of St. John the Baptist, and the beatitude of the elect before the general resurrection.
- Phoenix Reviviscens (Resurging Phoenix), in which he provides notices of ancient Cistercian authors in England and contemporary ones in Spain, and also a short autobiographical sketch.
- Menologium Cisterciense (in folio), his principal work. In the first volume he gives the lives of Cistercians notable for their sanctity, while the second volume contains the rule, the constitutions, and privileges of the order, with a history of the founding of the military orders attached. It was through him that portraits were engraved of many of the beatified and other illustrious members of the Cistercian Order.

The Catholic Encyclopedia describes his works as "elegant yet concise" with "a profound erudition", but criticizes the accuracy of his dates. Historian Claude Chalemot, Cistercian Abbot of La Colombe abbey, disapproves of his choices of persons to include in and exclude from his Menology.
