= Friedrich von Kielmansegg =

German soldier and officer (1768–1851)

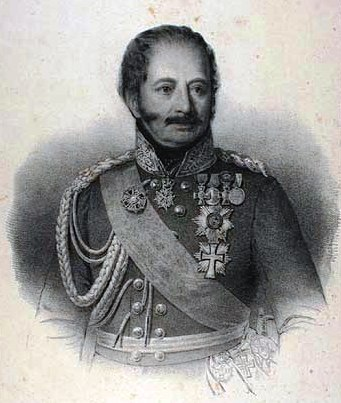
- Born: 17 December 1768
- Died: 18 July 1851 (aged 82)
- Military career
- Allegiance: Electorate of Hanover; Kingdom of Hanover
- Branch: Hanoverian Army
- Service years: c. 1800s-1803, 1813-1832
- Rank: Colonel (Electorate); Major-General (Kingdom, 1815); Lieutenant-General (Kingdom, 1816)
- Commands: 1st Hanoverian Brigade (Anglo-Allied Army); Korps der Kielmannseggeschen Jäger
- Conflicts: Napoleonic Wars; War of the Sixth Coalition; German campaign of 1813; Hundred Days; Battle of Quatre Bras; Battle of Waterloo
- Awards: Grand Cross of the Royal Guelphic Order; Hanoverian Waterloo Medal; Grand Cross of the Order of the Sword; Grand Cross of the Order of the Dannebrog; Knight of the Pour la Vertu Militaire; Knight of the Order of Saint Anna; Knight of the Order of Saint Vladimir

Major-General Friedrich Otto Gebhard von Kielmansegg (17 December 1768 – 18 July 1851) was a German soldier and officer in the service of the Kingdom of Hanover who fought during the Waterloo Campaign.

== Life ==
Friedrich von Kielmansegg was the son of Ratzeburg chemist Friedrich von Kielmansegg (1728-1800). His brother Ludwig von Kielmansegg was a senior officer in the military, while his younger brother Ferdinand von Kielmansegg became Minister of War.

Kielmannsegg joined the military service of the Electorate of Brunswick-Lüneburg. The 1803 Convention of Artlenburg ended his military career and at first he withdrew to the family estate in Holstein. In the German Campaign of 1813 he was a colonel of collective defence at his personal expense (36,000 old taler). The same year he established his corps of jägers the Korps der Kielmannseggeschen Jäger. The corps was disbanded in 1814. Kielmannsegg was promoted to major general in 1815 and the same year led the Hanoverian Brigade at the battles of Quatre Bras and Waterloo. In 1816 he joined the new army of the Kingdom of Hanover and remained on active duty until 1832, becoming a lieutenant-general. He joined the Hannover Freemasons in 1839.

He died on 18 July 1851 in Hanover at the age of 82.

== Awards ==
He received the following orders and decorations:

- Kingdom of Hanover:
  - Grand Cross of the Royal Guelphic Order, 1821
  - Hanoverian Waterloo Medal
  - War Commemoration Medal (1813)
  - Wilhelm-Cross
- (Bremen (state)) (Hamburg) Free Hanseatic Cities: War Medal of the Hanseatic League
- Electorate of Hesse: Knight of the Military Merit Order, 10 August 1817
- Sweden: Grand Cross of the Sword, 1st Class
- Denmark: Grand Cross of the Dannebrog, 6 July 1839
- Russian Empire:
  - Knight of St. Anna, 2nd Class
  - Knight of St. Vladimir, 4th Class
