= Marbais =

Section of Villers-la-Ville, Wallonia, Belgium

Coordinates: 50°33′N 4°32′E

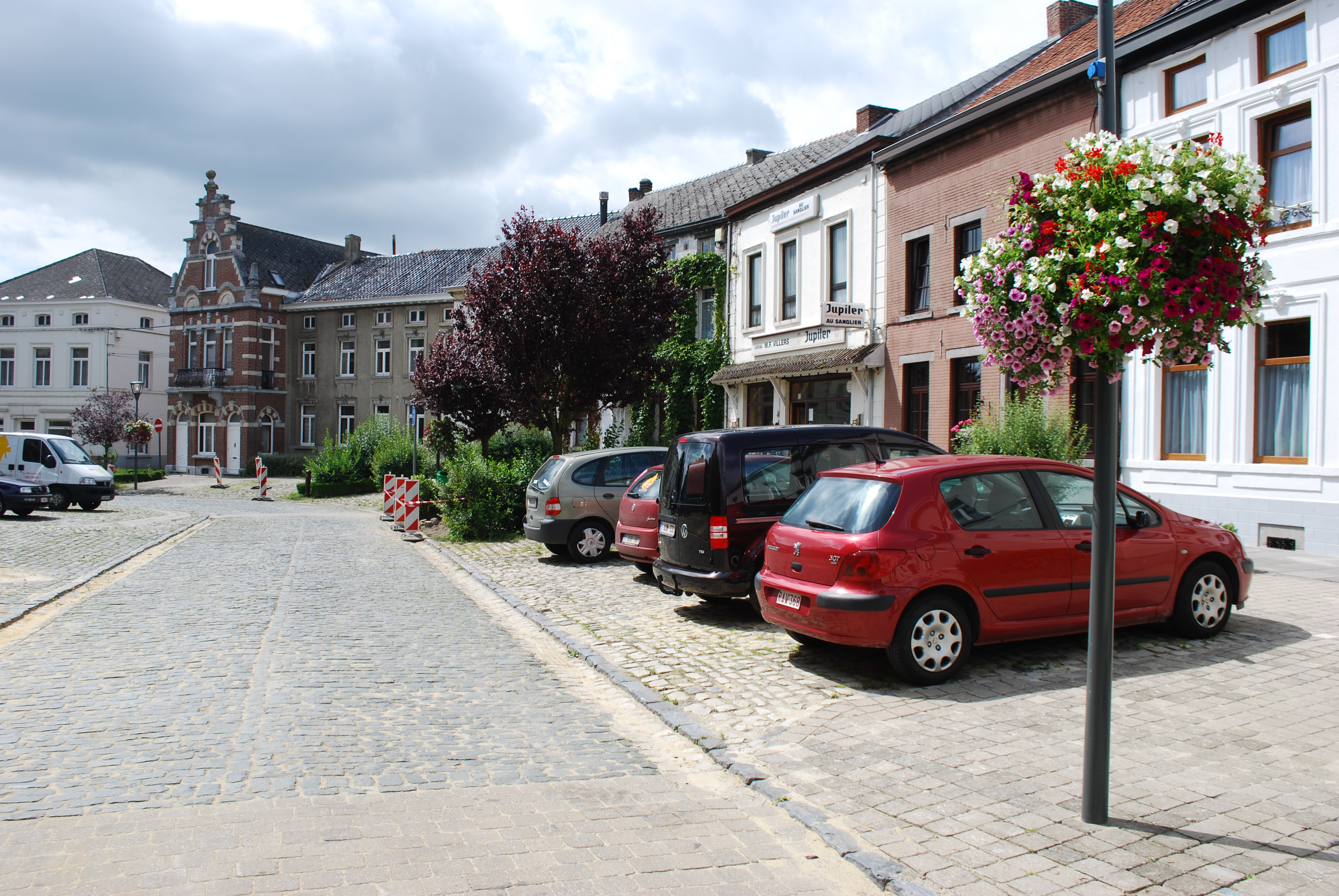
Town centre of Marbais

Marbais (French pronunciation: [maʁbɛ]; Walloon: Marbé) is a village of Wallonia and a district of the Belgian municipality of Villers-la-Ville, located in the province of Walloon Brabant, Belgium.

== Geography ==
The land registry divides Marbais into nine sections: Rigenée, Priesmont, le Monceau du Berger, l'Arbre de la Bruyère, le Bois Gilot, le Village, Cognée, Marbisoux et Gentil Sart.

== History ==
The history of Marbais is intertwined with that of its lords. The Marbais family had very significant possessions in the valley of the River Thyle, an area long disputed between the Dukes of Brabant and the counts of Namur. They carefully cultivated both sides and thus found themselves vassals both of the Duchy of Brabant and of the County of Namur. In 1146, Gauthier de Marbais and his mother endowed the Cistercian monks of Villers Abbey in the northern part of their lands. However, their lineage disappeared from the village in the 17th century when the daughter of the last Lord of Marbais sold his land to the neighbouring noble family, the 't Serclaes Tilly. One of his cousins, Lord La Haye-Brigode of Saint-Amand tried hard to recover the manor but failed. The Marbais lineage continued in the village of Saint-Amand into the second half of the eighteenth century.

Throughout its history, the economy of the village was predominantly agricultural. A brewery existed in 1896 and employed 102 people. Today the village still has a few medium-sized businesses.

The village of Marbais maintained several traditions over the centuries. It is said that Gerard de Marbais brought back several pieces of the Holy Cross from a crusade to Jerusalem. A bull of Pope Paul V, dated 15 May 1609, mentions the presence of the relic and grants indulgences related to acts of devotion. This relic still exists and is the subject of veneration during the 26 km Holy Cross Procession which takes place on the first Sunday in May. This procession involves two societies, the Fire Knights of the Holy Cross and the Royal Oath of San Sebastian. On the last Sunday in April, the Brotherhood organises the Shooting of the Royal Bird of Jirau, an archery contest which involves shooting a rooster placed on top of a 30-metre pole. The archer who manages to do so bears the title of king for a year and participates with 11 colleagues in the Holy Cross Procession.

== Points of interest ==
- Museum of Old Tools or Oasthouse Museum, (Musée de "la Touraille"). This museum exhibits hand tools representing a dozen trades. Woodworking is strongly represented. A collection of tools and utensils from rural life in 1900.

== Notable people ==
- Léon Delune (1862-1941), the Belgian architect.
- Philippe de Marbais (?-1568), who fought in the Dutch wars of independence.
