= Sart-Dames-Avelines =

Section of Villers-la-Ville, Wallonia, Belgium

Coordinates: 50.56841°N 4.49346°E

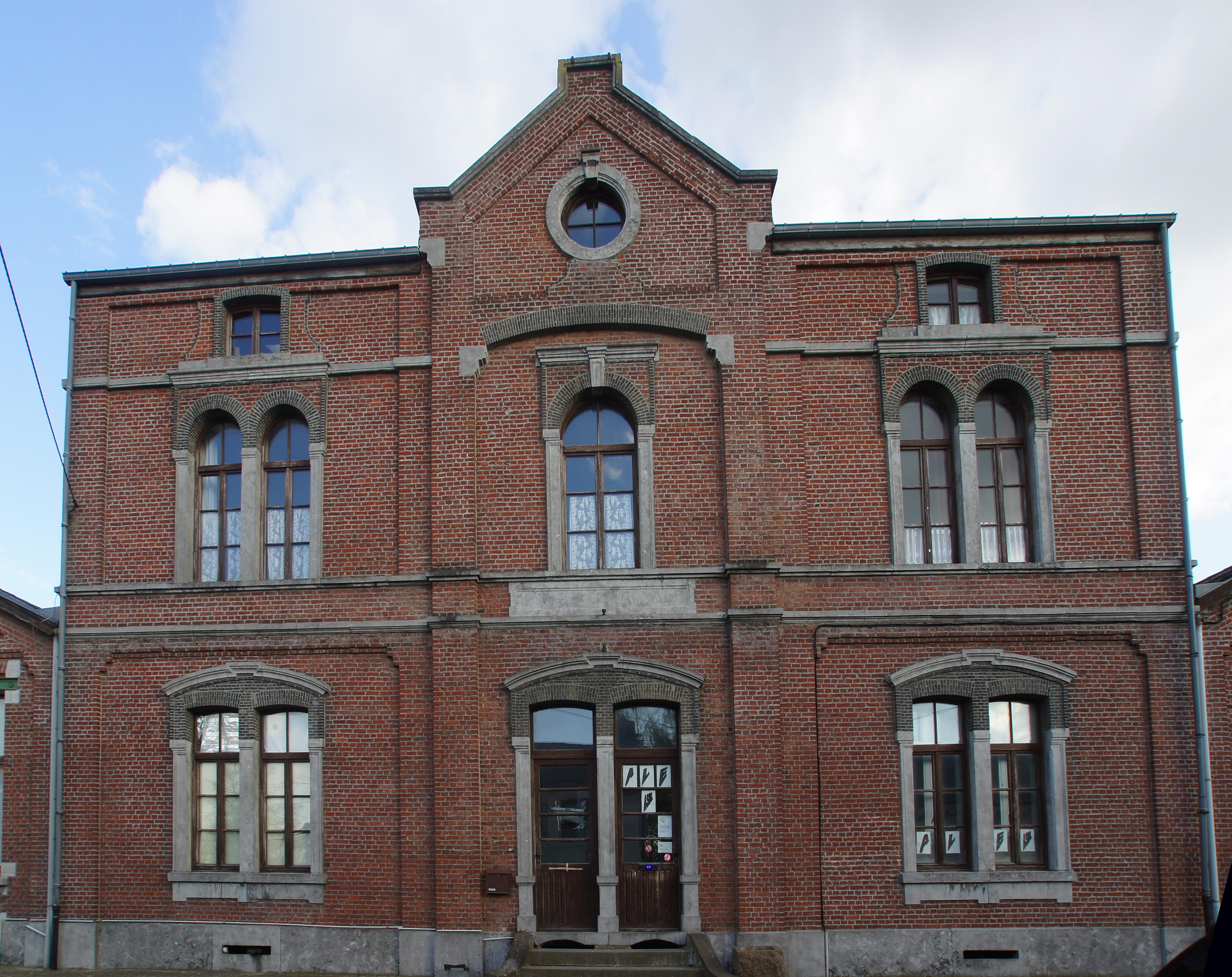
The Old Town Hall in Sart-Dames-Avelines

Sart-Dames-Avelines (Walloon: Sårt-Dames-Avlenes) is a village of Wallonia and a district of the municipality of Villers-la-Ville, located in the south of the province of Walloon Brabant, Belgium. (Note: Some 19th-century British histories of the Waterloo Campaign identify this village as Sart-à-Mavelines (Siborne, William (1844). "Part of Belgium". Atlas to William Siborne's History of the Waterloo Campaign.).)
