= Pour la Vertu Militaire =

Pour la vertu militaire Militär-Verdienstorden
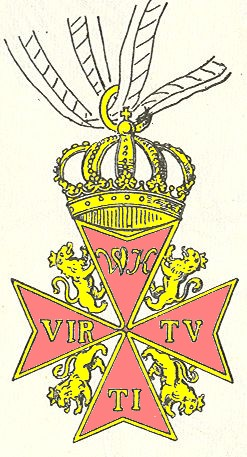
- Obverse
- Type: single-class order
- Country: Hesse-Kassel
- Presented by: the Landgraviate of Hesse-Kassel
- Eligibility: Military personnel
- Motto: VIRTUTI (Lat.: for virtue)
- Status: Obsolete
- Established: 25 February 1769
- Final award: 1866
- Ribbon

Precedence
- Next (higher): House Order of the Golden Lion
- Related: Pour le Mérite

The Pour la vertu militaire (Fr.: for military virtue) was a military order of merit established on 25 February 1769 by Frederick II, Landgrave of Hesse-Kassel. The order, modelled on the Prussian Pour le Mérite, could be awarded in a single class to officers of Hessian army or allied armies for wartime or peacetime military merit. When awarded for peacetime merit, only officers from major upwards were eligible. In 1820 the French name was changed to German: Militär-Verdienstorden (Order of Military Merit). It was discontinued in 1866, after the annexation of Hessen-Kassel by the Kingdom of Prussia.
