= Mon Plaisir =

Coordinates: 51.51455°N 0.12675°W

Mon Plaisir, Monmouth Street, Covent Garden 01.jpg
- Interactive map of Mon Plaisir, Monmouth Street, Covent Garden 01.jpg

Restaurant information
- Established: 1943
- Previous owner: Jean Viala
- Location: 19-21 Monmouth Street, Covent Garden, London, WC2H 9DD, United Kingdom
- Website: www.monplaisir.co.uk

Mon Plaisir at 19-21 Monmouth Street, Covent Garden, is London's oldest family run French restaurant, founded by Jean Viala and his wife in 1943.

It was opened by Jean Viala and his wife in 1943, and bought by their head waiter Monsieur Alain Lhermitte in 1972 who expanded it from one to four dining rooms, retaining the zinc bar that came from a brothel in Lyon. In April 2022 Alain Lhermitte retired and the restaurant was acquired by Fabio Lauro & Family, making them the third family to successively run this venue.

The team behind BBC Radio 4's The Moral Maze would have dinner on Wednesday evenings at Mon Plaisir, while Hugo Gryn (1930-1996), the rabbi and broadcaster, was alive.
