= Tilly, Belgium =

Section of Villers-la-Ville, Wallonia, Belgium

Coordinates: 50°34′N 4°33′E

Tilly (Walloon: Tiyî) is a village of Wallonia and district of the municipality of Villers-la-Ville, located in the province of Walloon Brabant, Belgium.

It had a population of 1,707 inhabitants on December 31, 2007.

Johann Tserclaes, Count of Tilly (1559-1631), a field marshal who commanded the Catholic League's forces in the Thirty Years' War, was born here.

Near the village lies a Gallo-Roman tumulus called the Tumulus of Tilly.

== Transport ==
- Tilly railway station
