= Villers-la-Ville =

Municipality in Walloon Brabant province, Wallonia, Belgium

- Municipality
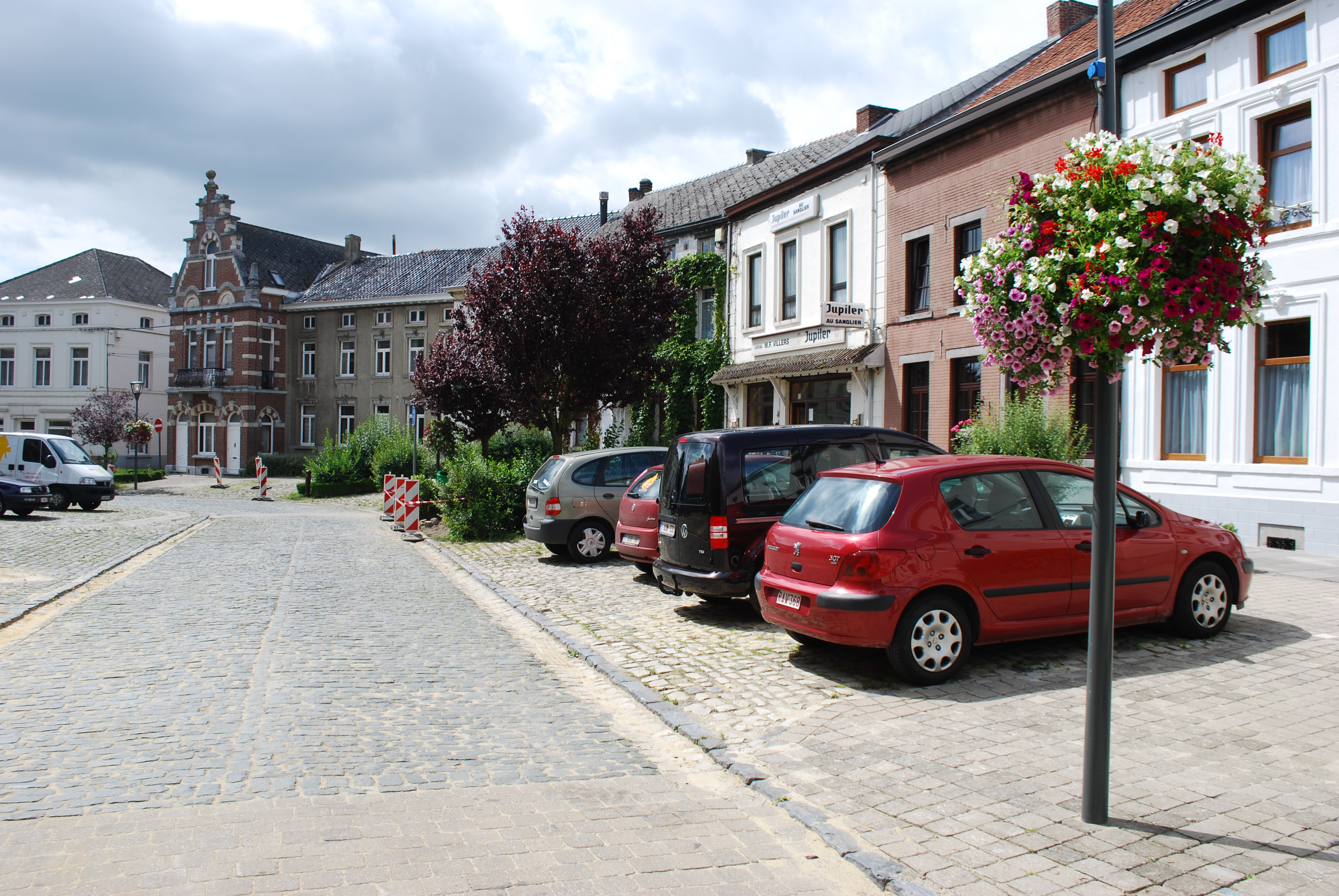
- Marbais

- Flag Coat of arms

- The municipality of Villers-la-Ville in Walloon Brabant
- Interactive map of Villers-la-Ville
- Location in Belgium
- Coordinates: 50°35′N 04°32′E
- Country: Belgium
- Community: French Community
- Region: Wallonia
- Province: Walloon Brabant
- Arrondissement: Nivelles

Government
  - Mayor: Emmanuel Burton (MR)
  - Governing party: MR

Area
  - Total: 48.03 km^{2} (18.54 sq mi)

Population (2018-01-01)
  - Total: 10,713
  - Density: 223.0/km^{2} (577.7/sq mi)
- Postal codes: 1495
- NIS code: 25107
- Area codes: 071
- Website: www.villers-la-ville.be

Villers-la-Ville (French pronunciation: [vilɛʁs la vil]; Walloon: L' Abeye) is a municipality of Wallonia located in the Belgian province of Walloon Brabant. On January 1, 2006, Villers-la-Ville had a total population of 9,572. The total area is 47.45 km^{2,} giving a population density of 202 inhabitants per km^{2}. The municipality also includes the villages of Marbais, Mellery, Sart-Dames-Avelines and Tilly.

== Sites ==
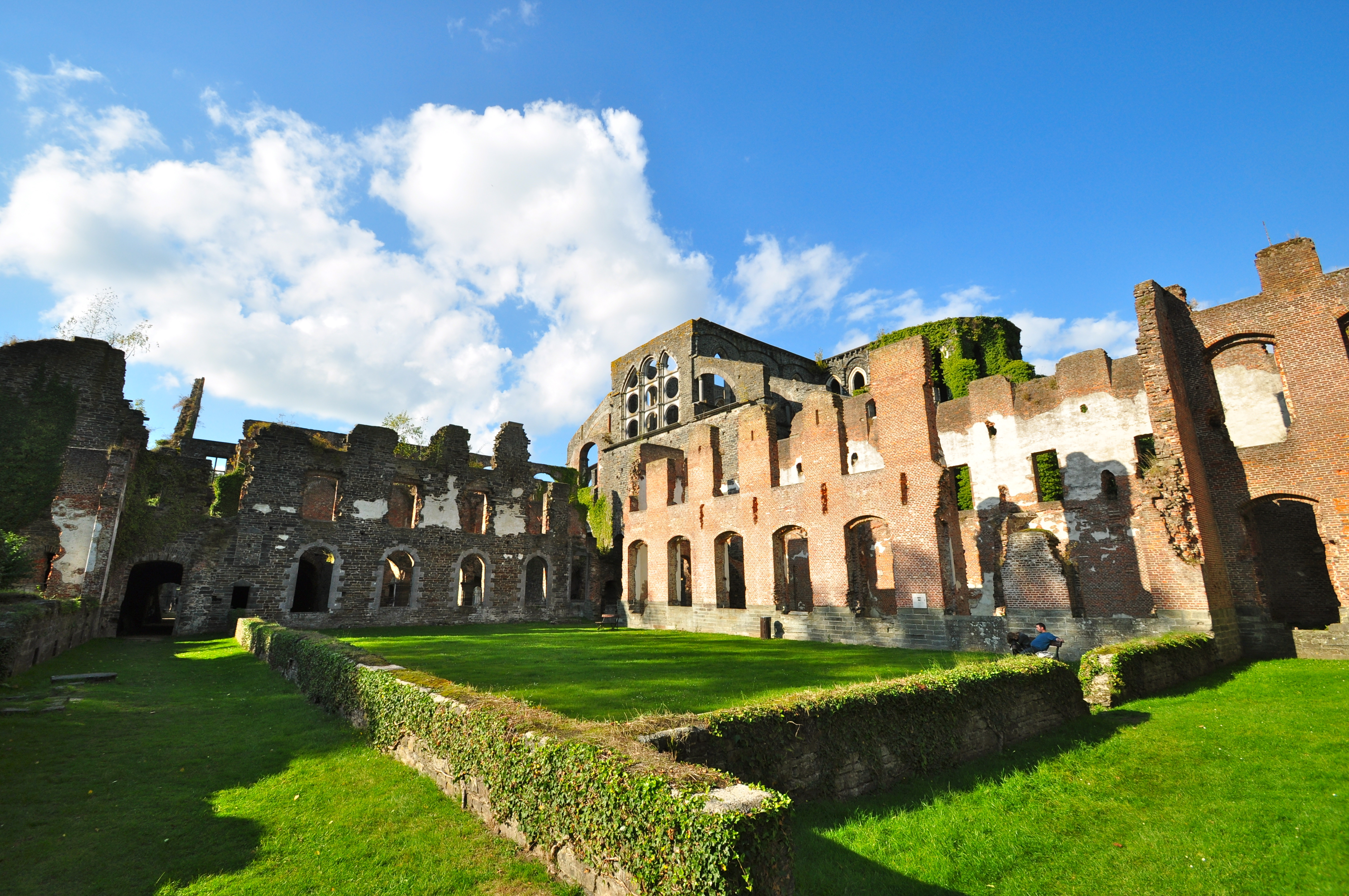
Ruins of Villers Abbey

To the north of the village lie the ruins of the Villers Abbey, one of Europe's most important Cistercian abbeys. It was founded in 1147 and destroyed by the French republicans in 1795. In the ruined church attached to the abbey, the tombstones of several dukes of Brabant of the 13th and 14th centuries are still to be found.

=== Postal history ===
The MARBAIS post office opened on 1 June 1838. It used postal distribution code 33 with bars (before 1864), and code 235 with points before 1874. The VILLERS-LA-VILLE post office opened on 10 February 1865. SART-DAMES-AVELINES on 15 October 1877, TILLY on 8 November 1906.

Postal codes in 1969:

- 6318 Marbais
- 6320 Villers-la-Ville
- 6321 Tilly
- 6322 Mellery
- 6328 Sart-Dames-Avelines

Code 1495 since at least October 1990.

== Transport ==
- Villers-la-Ville railway station
- Tilly railway station, in the sub-municipality of Tilly
