= Villers Abbey =

Former abbey in Villers-la-Ville, Walloon Brabant, Belgium

- Abbaye de Villers (French)
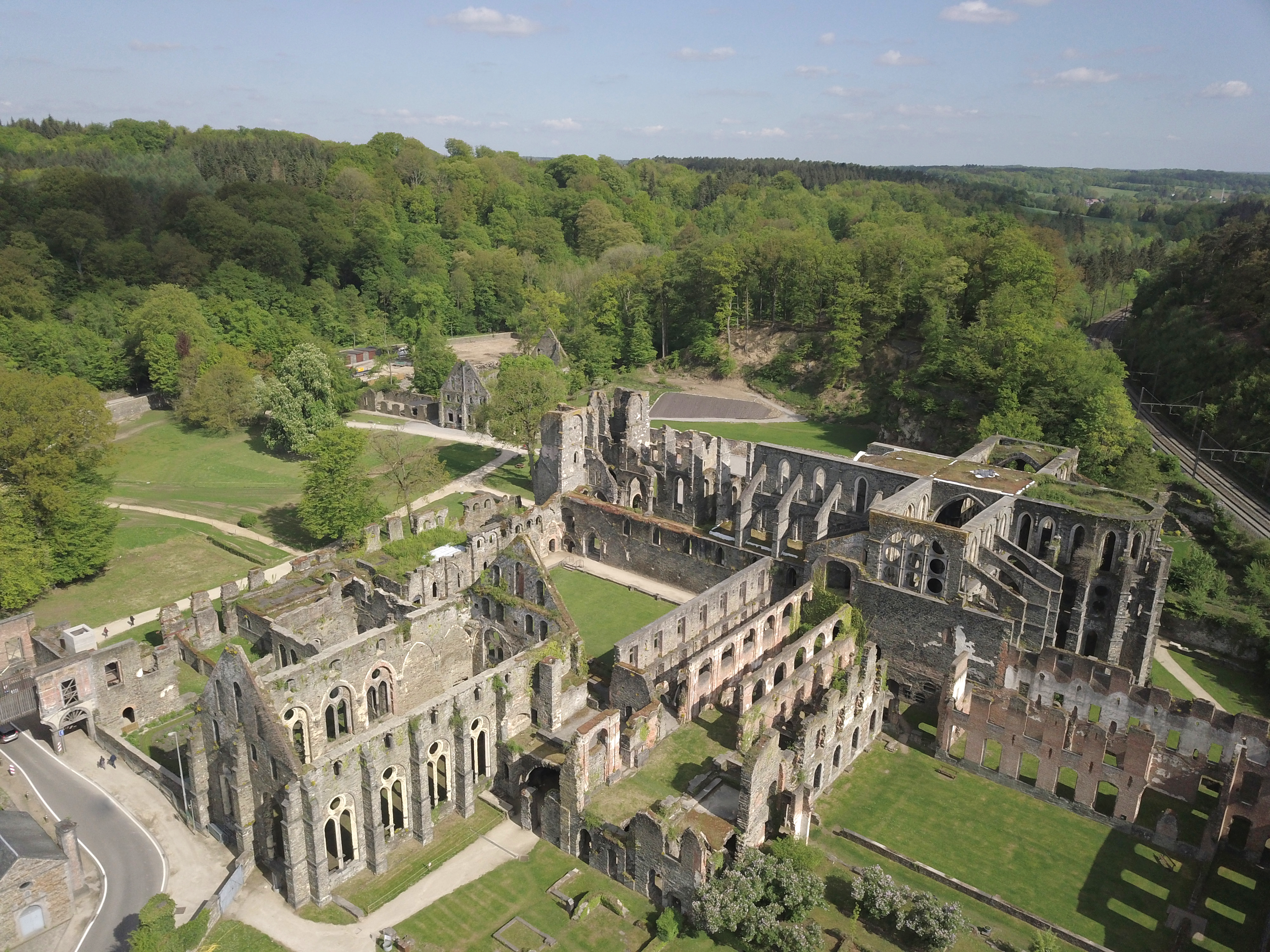
- Aerial view of the ruins of Villers Abbey

General information
- Type: Abbey
- Location: Villers-la-Ville, Walloon Brabant, Belgium
- Coordinates: 50°35′26″N 4°31′47″E

Villers Abbey (French: Abbaye de Villers) is a former Cistercian abbey located in the town of Villers-la-Ville, Walloon Brabant, Belgium. Founded in 1146, the abbey was abandoned in 1796. Most of the site has since fallen into ruins. These ruins now belong to the Walloon Region and are classified as part of Wallonia's Major Heritage.

== History ==
In 1146, twelve Cistercian monks and three lay brothers from Clairvaux came to Villers in order to establish the abbey on land granted to them by Gauthier de Marbais. After establishing several preliminary sites (Villers I and Villers II), work was finally undertaken in the 13th century to build the current site. The choir was constructed by 1217, the crypt by 1240, and the refectory by 1267. The church itself took 70 years to build and was completed by the end of the century.

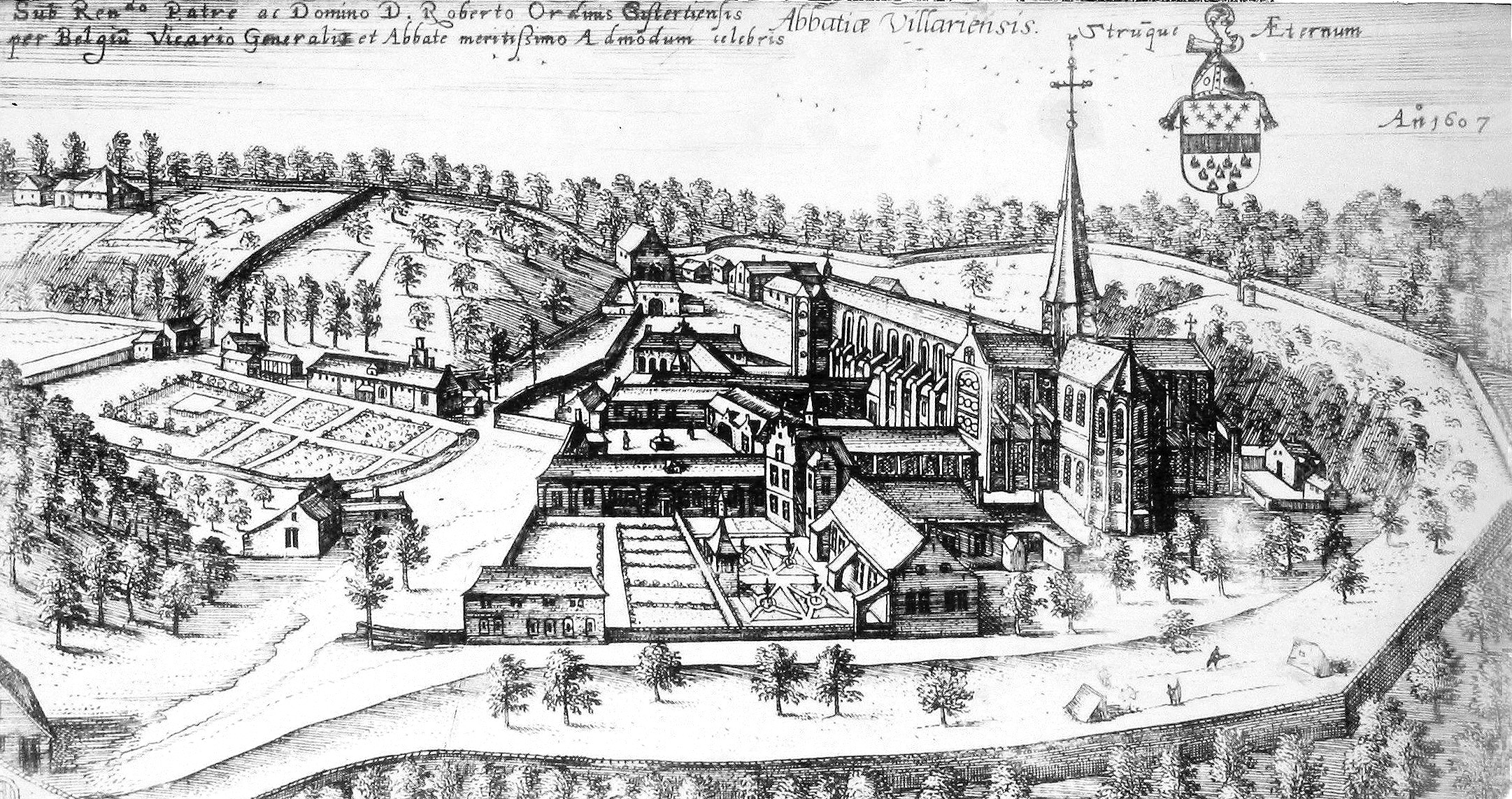
Villers Abbey in 1607 (anonymous engraving)

During this period, the abbey reached the height of its fame and importance. Contemporary accounts suggest that roughly 100 monks and 300 lay brothers resided within its walls, although this is possibly an exaggeration. The lands attached to the abbey also expanded considerably, reaching some 100 km^{2} (39 sq mi) of woods, fields, and pasturage.

Decline set in during the 16th century, tied to the larger troubles of the Low Countries. Spanish tercios, during the campaign of 1544, did considerable damage to the church and cloister, both of which were partially restored in 1587.

In the early 17th century, Crisóstomo Henríquez wrote the history of the abbey.

In the 17th and 18th centuries, the abbey's fortunes continued to diminish. The number of monks and the abbey's wealth dwindled, and it was finally abandoned in 1796 in the wake of the French Revolution.

== After dissolution ==
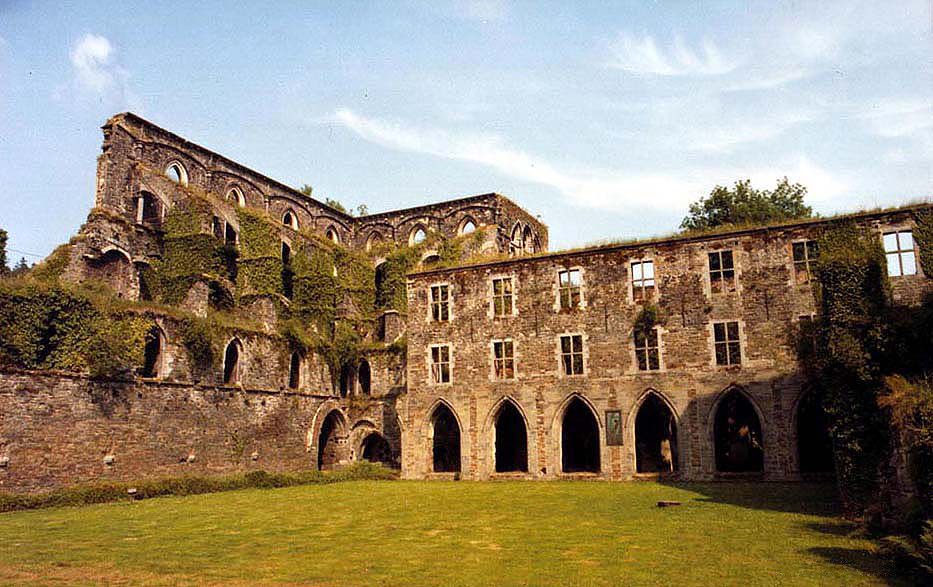
Villers Abbey ruins

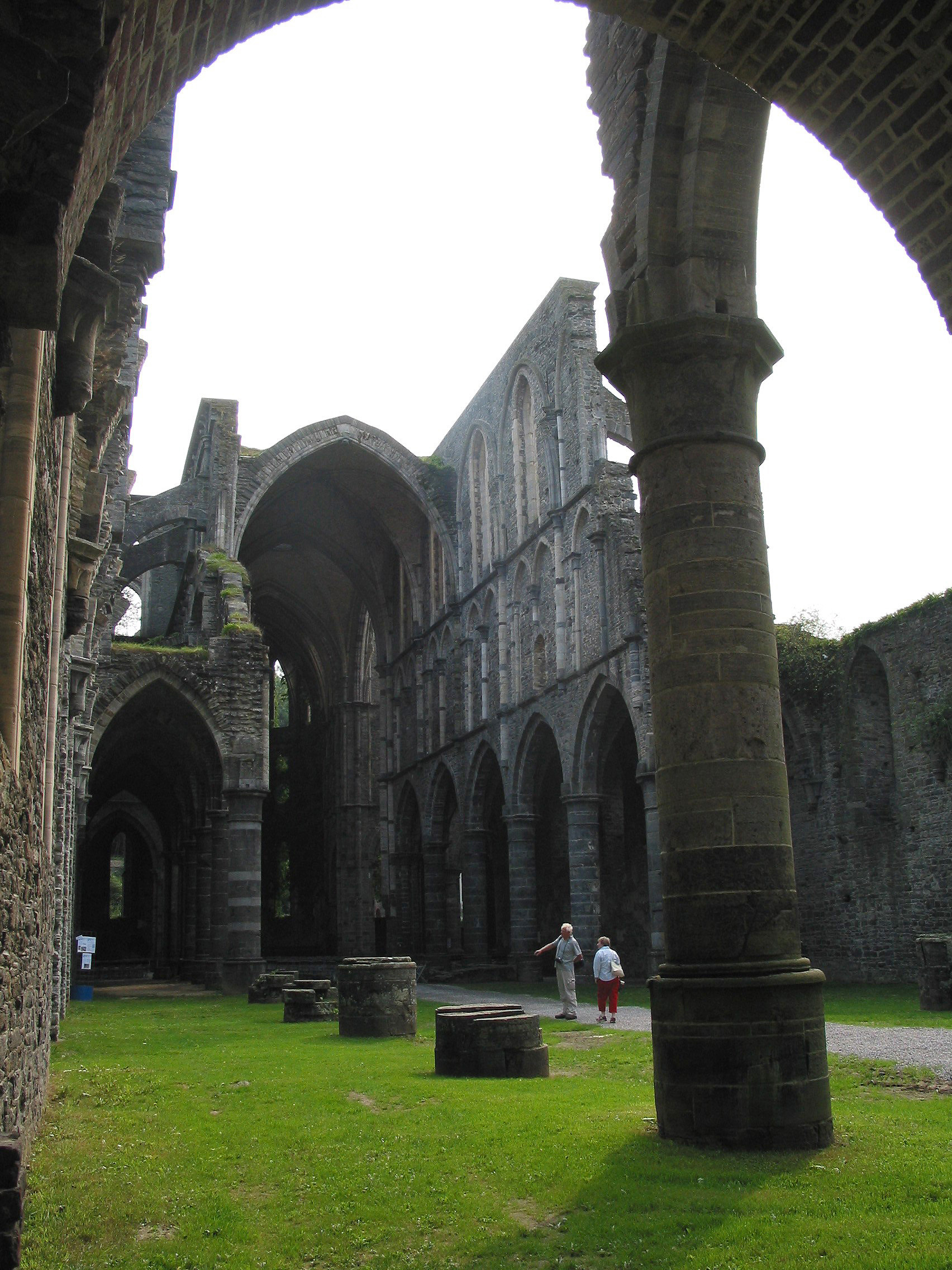
Villers Abbey church ruins

Further degradation to the site occurred in 1855, when the railway line between Ottignies-Louvain-la-Neuve and Charleroi passed through the old abbatial grounds.

In 1893, the Belgian state purchased the site and launched a conservation effort. Classed as an official historic site in 1973, the abbey has subsequently enjoyed considerable restoration, and the remains of the abbey along with numerous outbuildings can still be seen, including the cloister, refectory, kitchens, dormitories, and brewing house. Since 1992, the site has been maintained by the Association pour la Promotion Touristique et Culturelle de Villers (APTCV).

The church, although in ruins, is an outstanding example of Cistercian architecture, with imposing vaulting, arches, and rose windows.

The abbey now hosts an annual choir festival La Nuit des Chœurs in which a number of choirs sing a variety of music—classical through to gospel, jazz and pop arrangements—from different parts of the grounds over successive nights, culminating in a fireworks display and centre stage concert.

== Burials ==
- Henry II, Duke of Brabant
- Sophie of Thuringia, Duchess of Brabant
- John III, Duke of Brabant
- Gobert of Aspremont
- Juliana of Liège
- Anne of Kiev (disputed)

== Bibliography ==
- Brouette, Emile, "Abbaye de Villers à Tilly", in Monasticon belge, Province de Brabant, 4/2, Liège: Centre national de recherche religieuse, 1964, p. 341-405.
- Coomans, Thomas, L’abbaye de Villers-en-Brabant. Construction, configuration et signification d’une abbaye cistercienne gothique, Brussels, Racine; Brecht, Cîteaux. Commentarii cistercienses, 2000, 622 p. (Studia et documenta, XI).
- Coomans, Thomas, L'abbaye de Villers. Histoire des ruines (1796-1984), Louvain-la-Neuve, 1990 (Publication d'histoire de l'art et d'archéologie de l'université catholique de Louvain, 72).
- Coomans, Thomas, "From Romanticism to New Age: The Evolving Perception of a Church Ruin", in Téoros: revue de recherche en tourisme, Université du Québec à Montréal / École des Sciences de la Gestion, 24/2, 2005, p. 47-57.
- De Moreau, Edouard, L'abbaye de Villers en Brabant aux XIIe et XIIIe s. Etude d'histoire religieuse et économique, suivie d'une notice archéologique par le chanoine R. Maere, Brussels: A. Dewit, 1909, LXXI-350 p. (Université de Louvain. Recueil de travaux publiés par les membres des conférences d'histoire et de philologie, 21).
- Dubuisson, Michel, Anthologie de la vie quotidienne à l'abbaye de Villers-en-Brabant (XIIe-XVIIIe siècles), Villers: asbl Abbaye de Villers-la-Ville, 2006, 177 p.
- Henrivaux, Omer, Autour de l’abbatiat de Robert Henrion. 180 ans d’histoire de l’abbaye de Villers, 1486-1666, Beauvechain: Nauwelaerts, 2002, 249 p.
- Henrivaux, Omer, Jacques Hache, abbé de Villers, Beauvechain, Nauwelaerts, 2004, 285 p.
- Ploegaerts, Théophile, & Gustave Boulmont, "L'abbaye cistercienne de Villers pendant les cinq derniers siècles de son existence. Histoire religieuse et économique du monastère", in Annales de la Société archéologique de l'Arrondissement de Nivelles, t. XI, 1914–1926, p. 93-679.
- Villers. Revue trimestrielle de l'abbaye, Villers-la-Ville: asbl Abbaye de Villers-la-Ville, 1996-
