= Notermans (distillery) =

Gin distillery in Belgium

Notermans, a.k.a. La Campinoise, was a jenever distillery founded on the Kuringersteenweg, in Hasselt, in 1874 by Joseph Notermans. In its early days it was one of Hasselt's largest distilleries.

== History ==
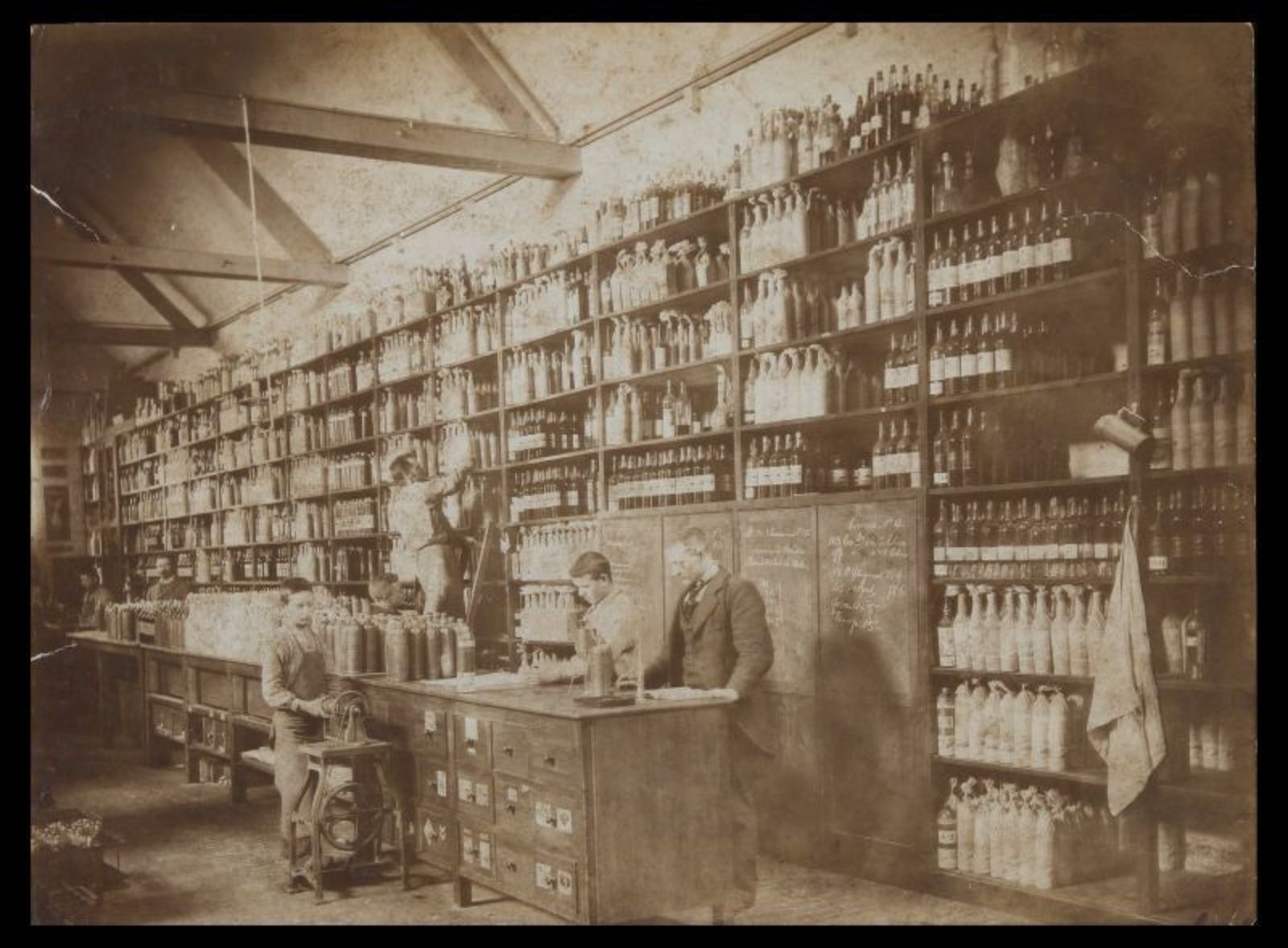

In 1874 Joseph Notermans (1852–1909) founded a company called Liqueur Distillery La Campinoise on Kuringersteenweg (Diestesteenweg) in Hasselt. It purchased alcohol elsewhere and turned it into Hasselt jenever and liqueurs. The distillery's focus was on liqueurs and these often won prizes. Between 1885 and 1907, the company was awarded more than 22 honorary diplomas and gold medals at international exhibitions in Europe, the United States and Australia. In 1896 the company also had a branch in Brussels. In 1899 the distillery moved to Koningin Astridlaan.

Lambert Looienga, who founded the Oranjeboom Distillery in 1897, had previously worked for a time at Notermans Distillery.

In 1949 Notermans Distillery became a private limited company, in which the Hasselt distilling family Fryns were also involved. Fryns took care of production, while Notermans took care of sales and administration. Besides liqueurs, the company now also started to produce aperitifs, sparkling wines, fruit juices, lemonades and spring waters. In 1952, the office and warehouse moved for a second time, from Koningin Astridlaan to the former Fryns buildings on Runkstersteenweg. Production moved to Martelarenlaan, near to Fryns’ main buildings. In 1964 Fryns took over production entirely, but retained the Notermans name.

The Notermans Distillery company archives are currently stored in Hasselt's City Archives.
