= Le Lion d'Or =

Gin distillery in Belgium

Le Lion d’Or was a large company whose activities included the distilling of jenever in Aalst, Belgium. That activity dates back to 1731. It was the largest distillery that ever operated in Aalst.

== History ==
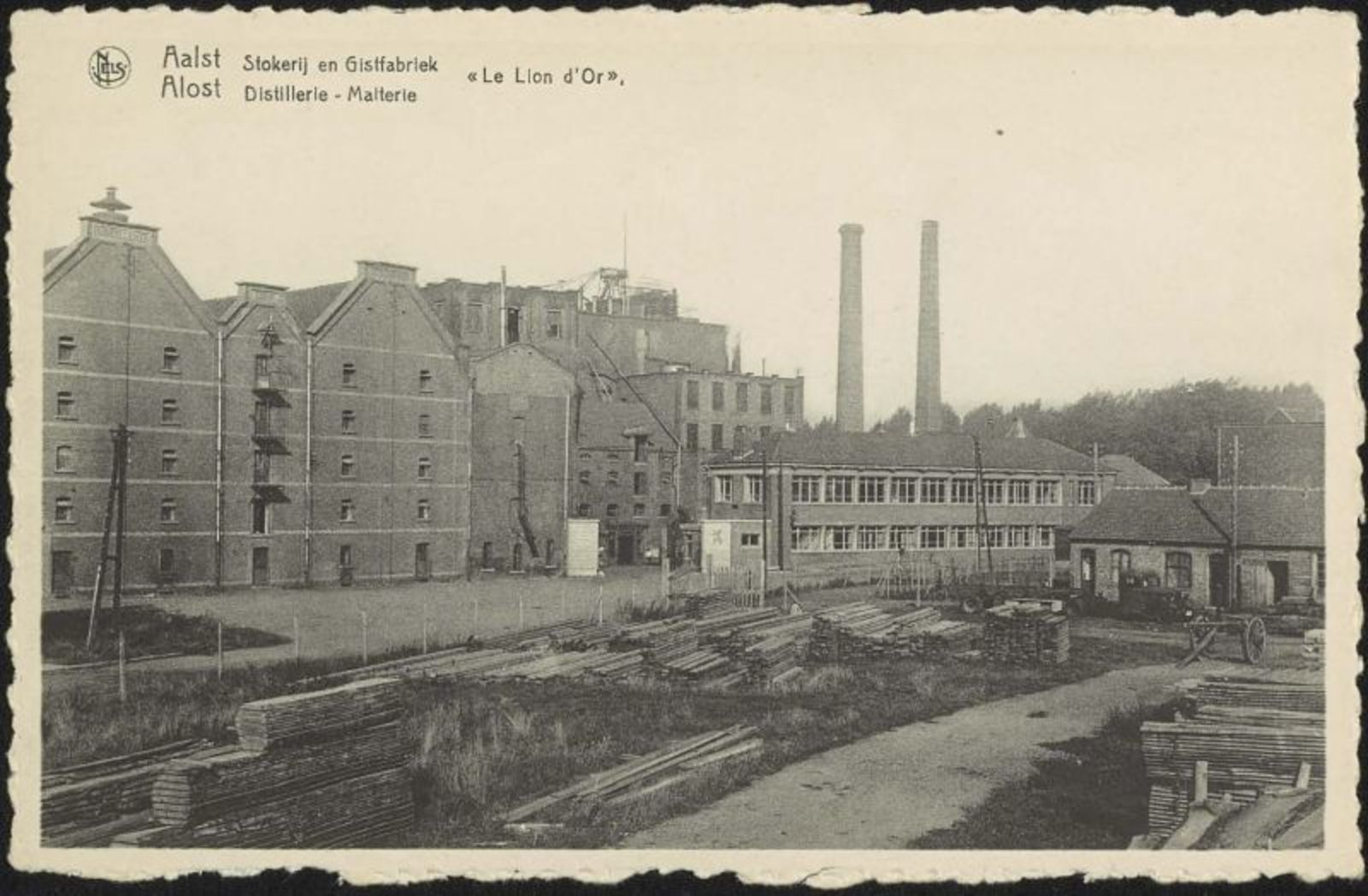
Postcard of distillery Le Lion d'Or in Aalst, Belgium

The distillery was founded in 1731. At first it was known as Popperode Farm, but then from 1775 onwards as Het Verbrand Hof. People also called it Hof Van Assche or Distillery Van Assche, after founder and distiller Karel Lodewijk van Assche.

In 1895 the distillery was taken over by the aristocrats Jacques de La Kethulle de Ryhove and Eugène de Hemptinne. They renamed the company Le Lion d'Or. As well as distilling jenever, this company fattened cattle and ran a malt house and a yeast factory.

In 1905 Le Lion D'or took part in the Liège International Exposition.

After a major expansion the previous year, the annual production in 1906 is recorded as being ‘1.1 million litres of 52° jenever’.

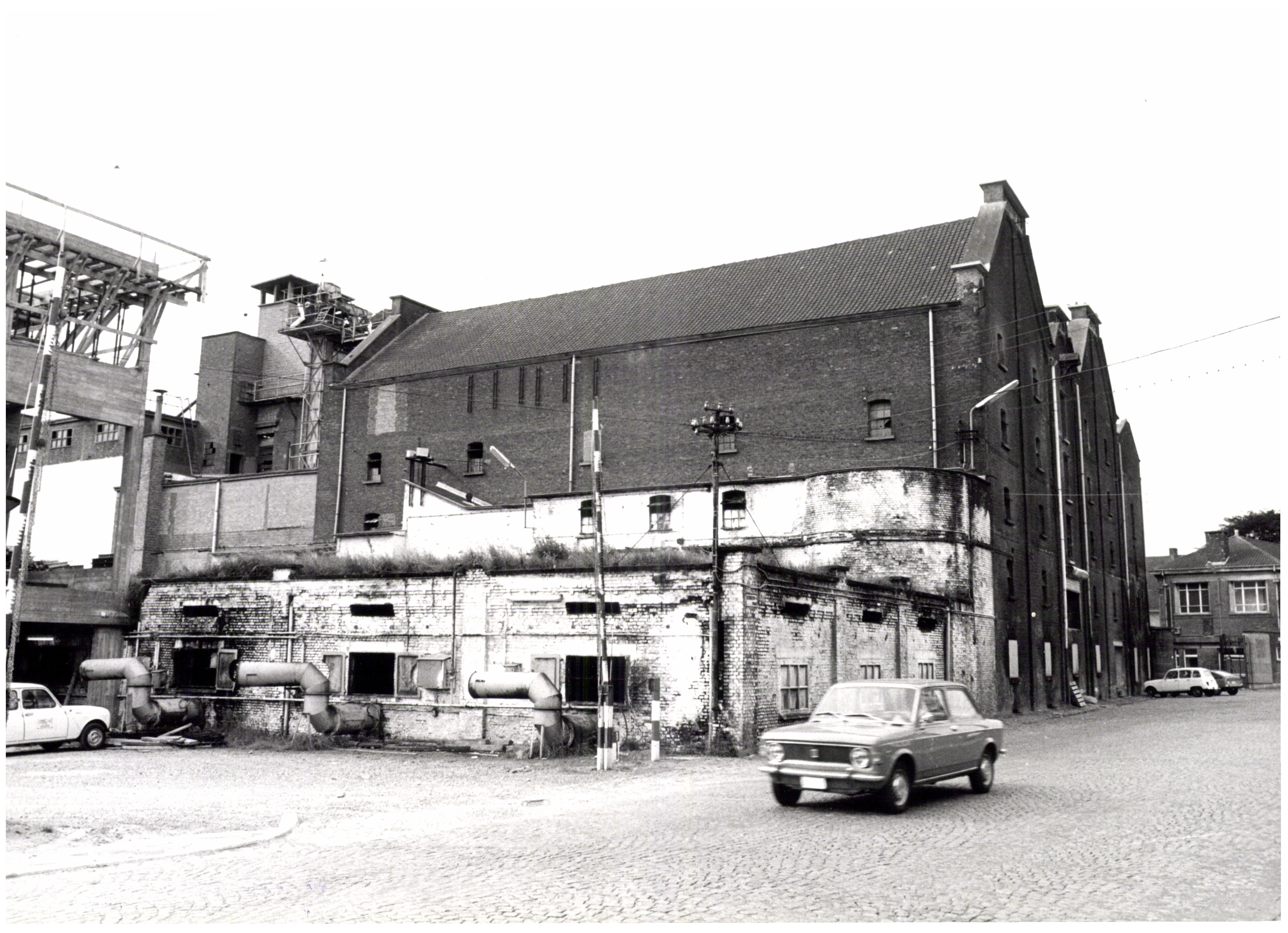
The buildings of the distilery in 1974

During World War I, Le Lion d’Or remained in operation and supplied the German army with jenever. In the resulting postwar scandal, the activities of ‘jenever merchant’ Eugène de Hemptinne were condemned, especially because he also deprived the local population of much needed foodstuffs – such as potatoes – in favour of the German occupier.

During World War II, the distillery came to a standstill. It was restarted after the war, but disagreements between the two families culminated in the permanent cessation of jenever distilling, yeast production and cattle fattening in 1948. From then on the company focussed on malt production and the production of animal feed. In 1964 the production of animal feed was also halted. Only the malt house remained in operation.

Things went from bad to worse with the company and in 1977 it closed down permanently.

Anno 2024, distillery, liqueur producer and wine merchant De Moor still produces grain jenever with the old Lion d’Or label in commemoration of the former distillery.

== Buildings ==
Over the years, the buildings underwent numerous changes.

In 1974 the factory chimney was demolished with dynamite.

In 1988 the City of Aalst bought the buildings. With the exception of the office buildings on the street side, these were all demolished to make way for the Le Lion d'Or industrial estate. These last remaining buildings were sold off in 2020.
