= Neefs (distillery) =

Neefs was a Belgian steam distillery, founded in 1832 by Jan Baptist Neefs (1791-?).

== History ==
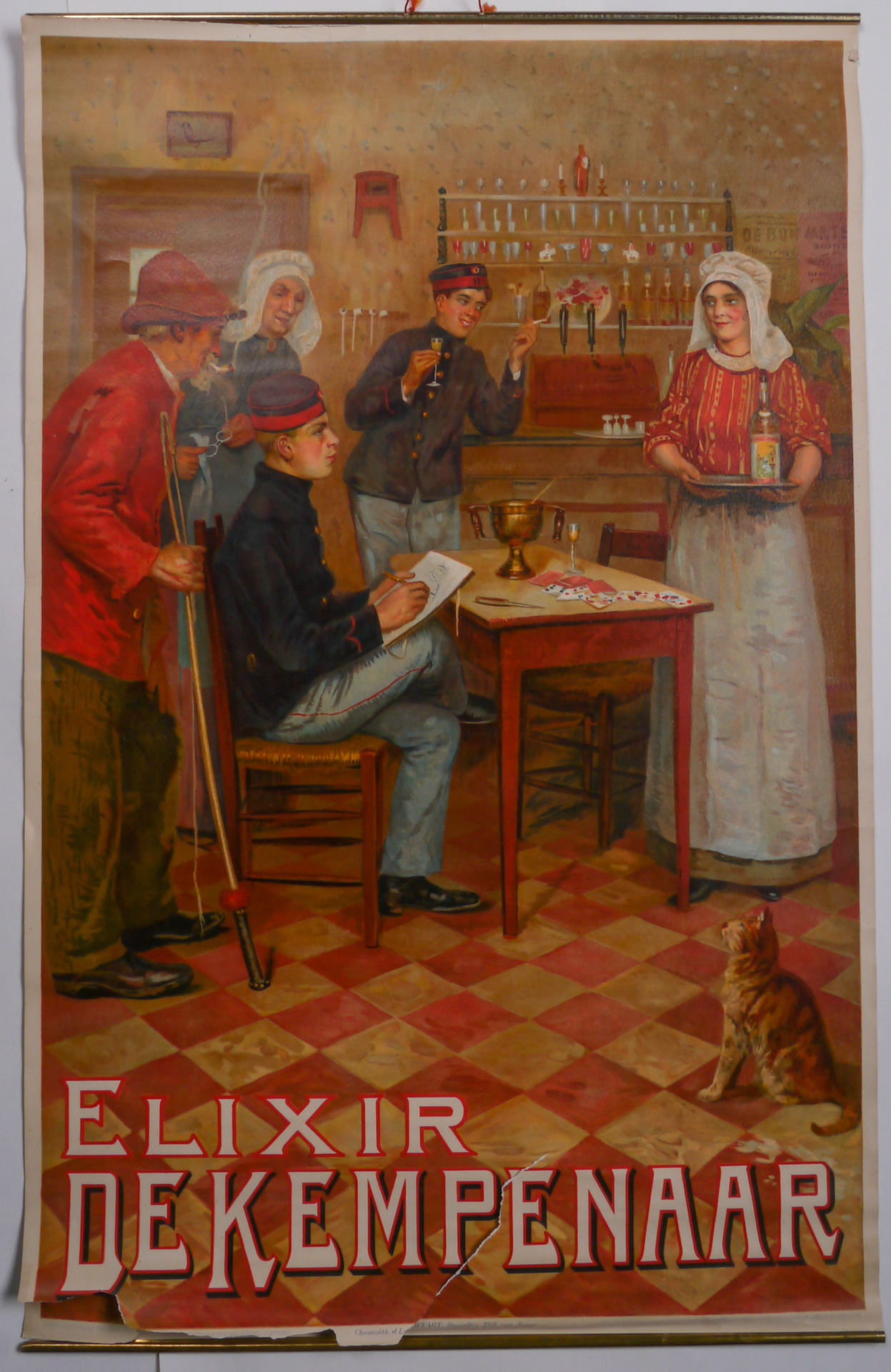
Poster for De Kempenaar

Around 1810, Jan Baptist Neefs worked as a cooper. In 1832 he became a winemaker in Antwerp's Keizerstraat, moving into the 17th-century mansion at number 3, the former Antonio Perez Hotel, thereby saving it from decay. His company converted the interior into offices and warehouses.

In 1864 Jan’s son Petrus Jacobus (Jacques), who would later lend his name to the family business, married Maria Elisabeth Van Eck. Jacques expanded the company's offerings to include jenever and liqueurs alongside wine. His brother Josephus, also a cooper, meanwhile focused on the wine and liqueur trade.

By 1890, the company exhibited at the Madrid International Exhibition, earning a gold medal. Grandson Joseph, who took over the company in the early 20th century, emphasized advertising and competed with well-known company De Beukelaer and its premium Elixir d'Anvers through a series of striking posters.

Following Joseph's death in 1921, the company was renamed Etablissements Jacques Neefs. Joseph's widow Gabrielle Cortiaens and his son Raymond, continued to influence company policy until 1967. After the accidental death of one of Raymond's sons, the family withdrew from the business.

In 1980, Geens Benelux took over the company, but they also withdrew in 2007.

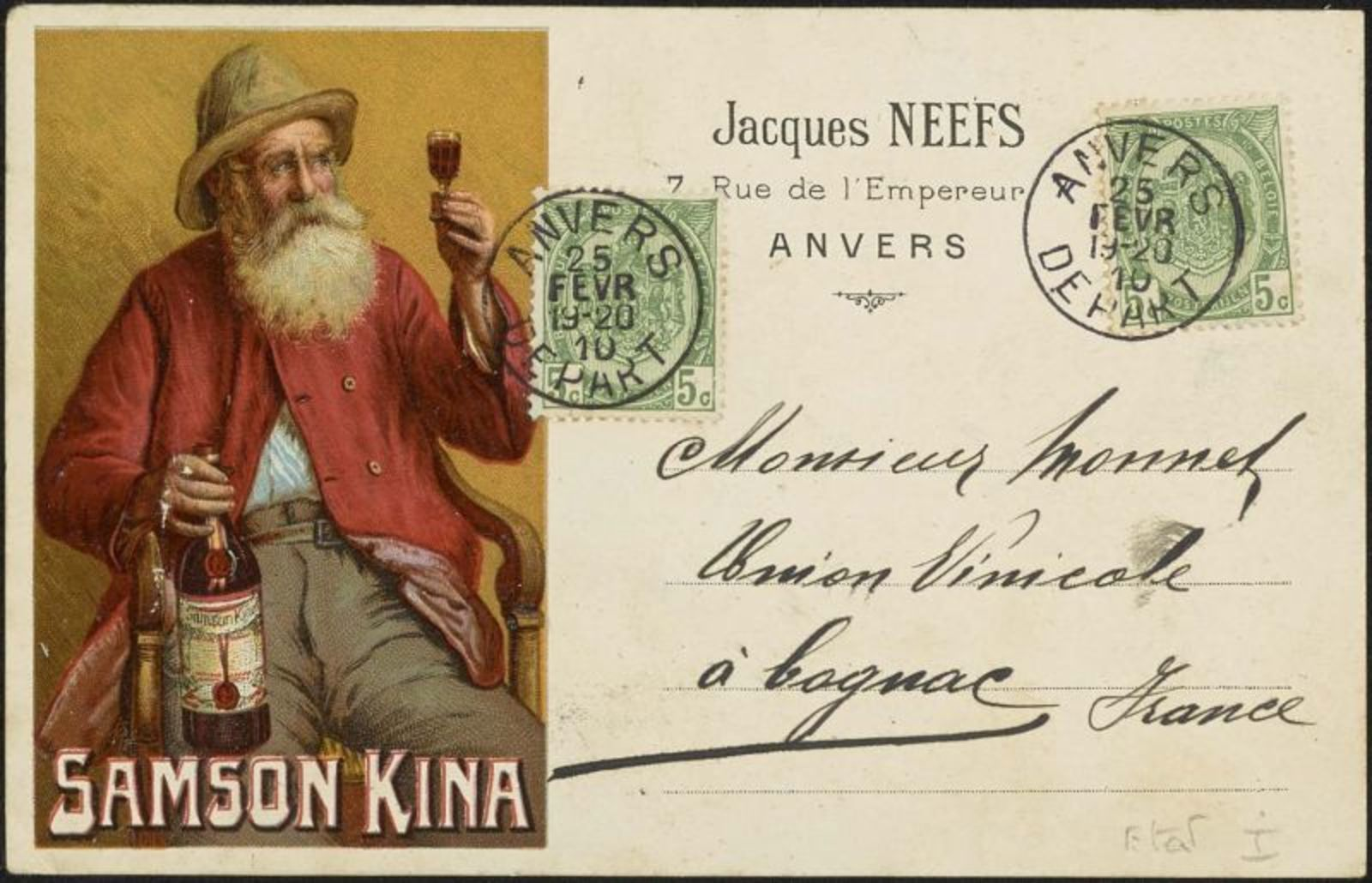

== Products ==
Neefs best known commercial products were:

- Elixir De Kempenaar, a liqueur registered in 1890

- 't Wit Stoopke, a jenever

- Vermouth Jacobino

- Elixir d'Afrique
