= Van den Bergh en Cie =

Van den Bergh en Cie (which originally traded as De Gulden Klok and later La Cloche - De Klok) was an Antwerp malt house, beer brewery and jenever distillery.

== History ==
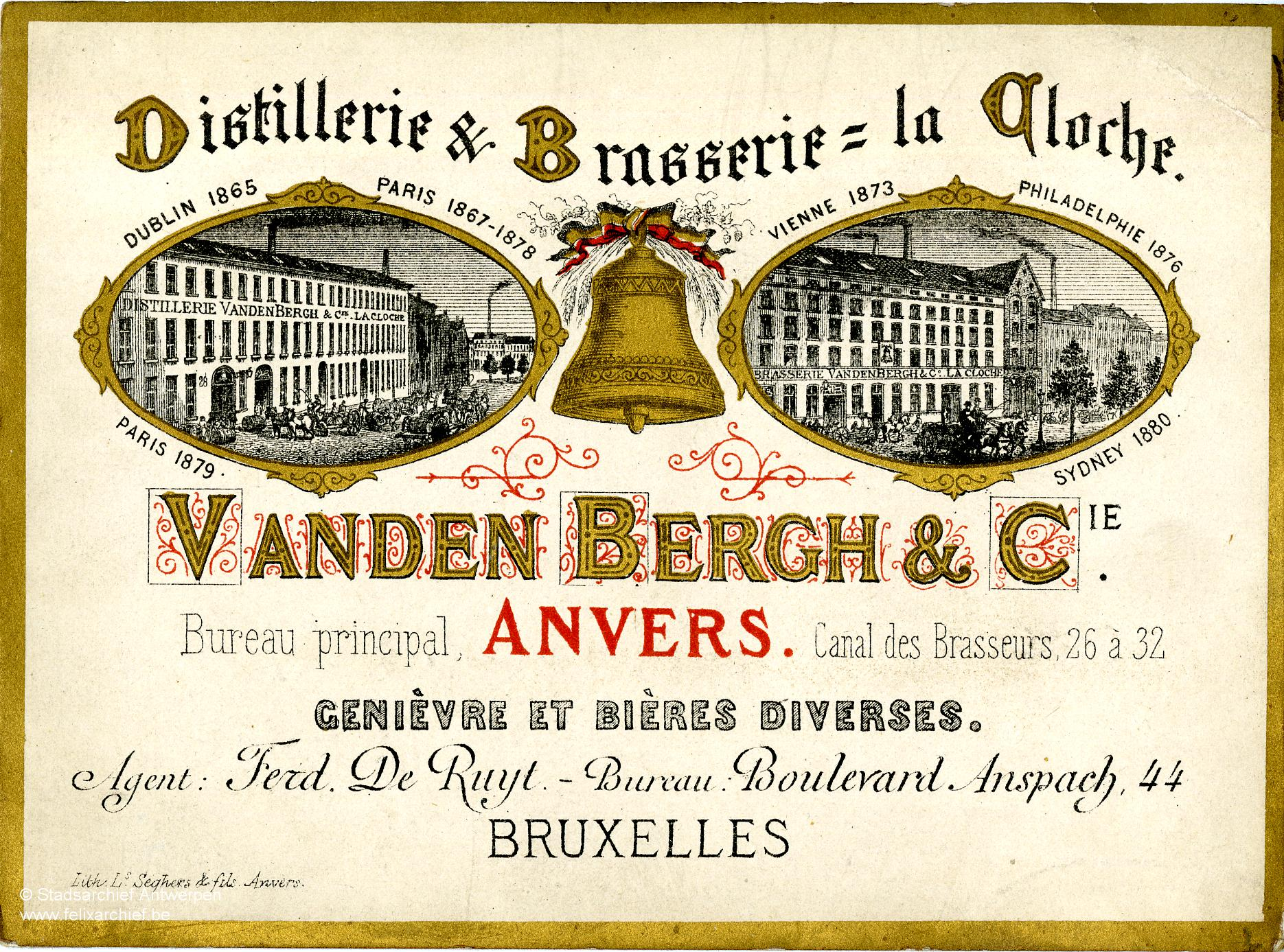

The business was founded by Jean (Jan) Jacques Van den Bergh-Aerts (1768-1844). He was also involved in the shipping company Van den Bergh et Fils and was a municipal councillor, alderman, senator and consul of Greece. His family had already been active as brewers and distillers for three centuries.

In 1843, shortly before Jean’s death, his sons Maximilian Van den Bergh (1802-1873) and Jean Félix Van den Bergh (1807-1885) bought the brewery from him.

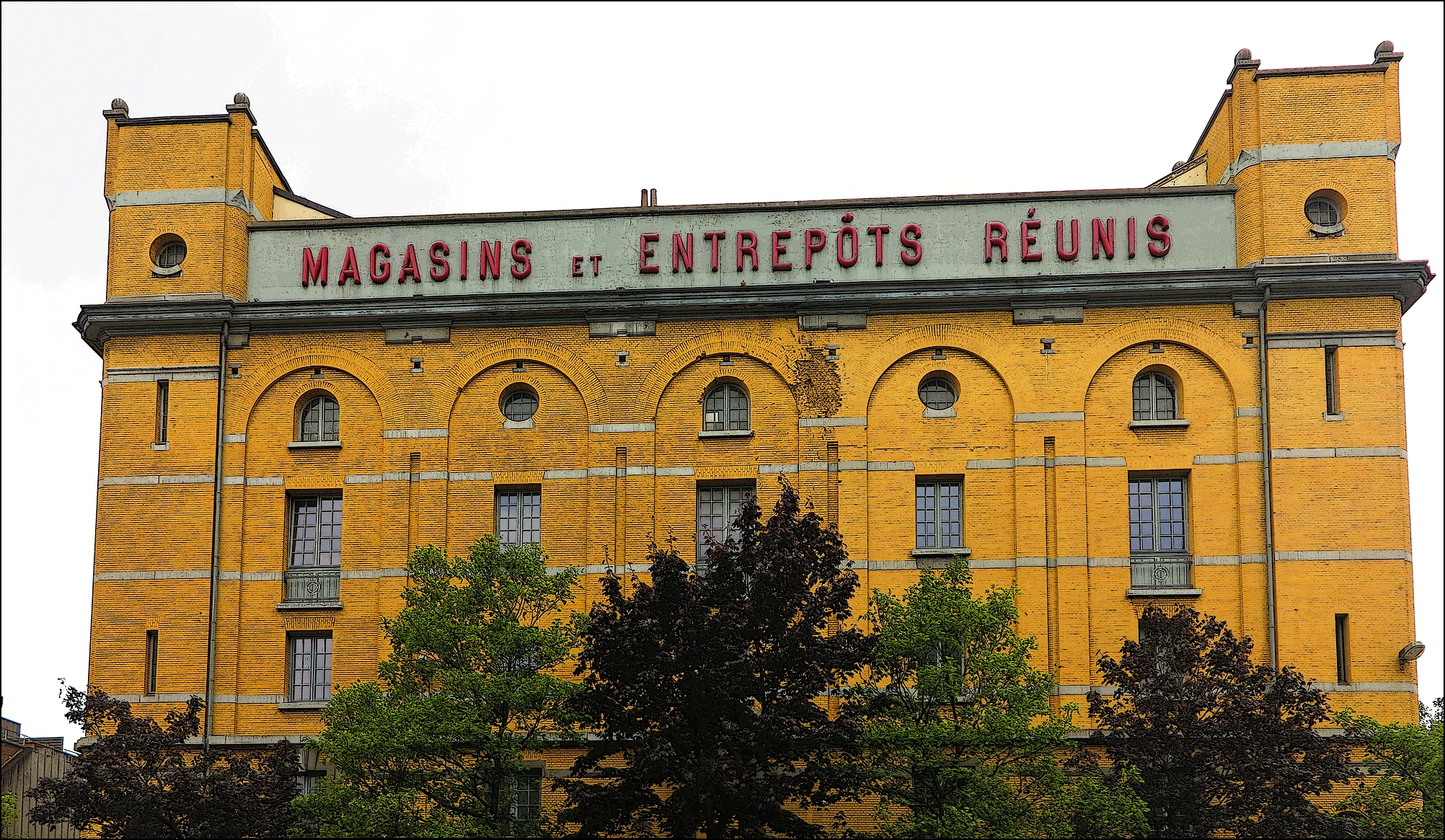

Well-known Antwerp locations were 7-11 Oudeleeuwenrui for the brewery and 26-32 Brouwersvliet for the jenever distillery. A fire insurance map by Gervais from 1898, confirms the presence on Oude Leeuwenrui of, among other things, beer cellars, ovens, a workshop, a machine room, a cooperage and a forge.

The company subsequently passed – presumably after the brothers' death – into the hands of Louis Lysen, a well-known banker and a relative by marriage.

In 1919 the warehouses, designed by Frans J.H. Bex, were sold to the Werf- en Vlasnatie and renamed 'Magazijn Albert'.

On the corner of Oudeleeuwenrui and Hessenplein there is a yellow building Magasins et Entrepôts Réunis La Cloche. This was designed by architect Joseph Hertogs in 1909 and built in 1910. The name La Cloche is a reference to the former brewery, the original 17th-century gate of which was saved and reused.
