= Fryns (distillery) =

Fryns is a Hasselt distillery, founded by the Fryns family in around 1885. The distillery is currently (anno 2023) run by the fourth and fifth generations of the family. Over the years, the distillery has moved between various locations in Hasselt.

== History ==
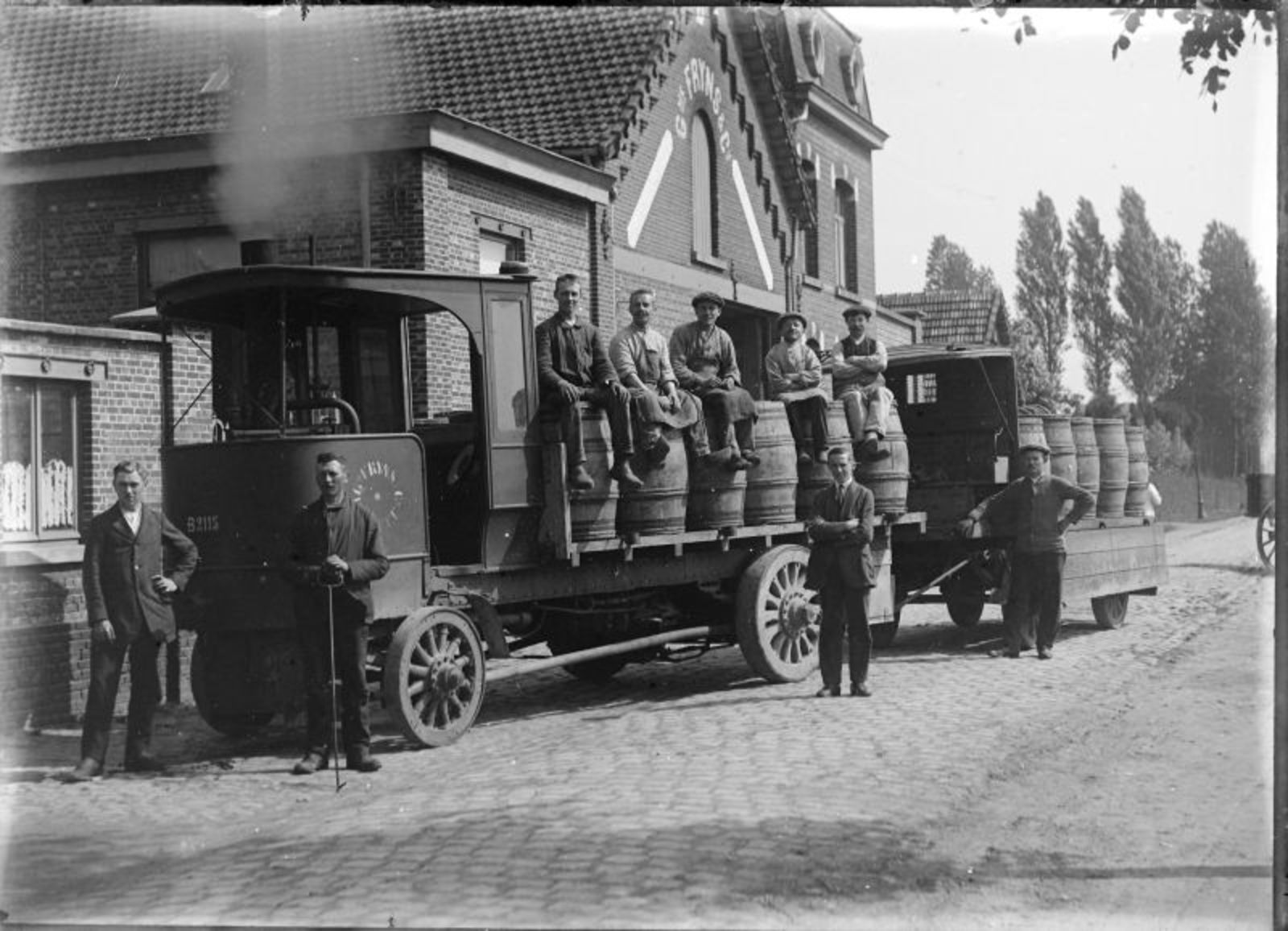
Distillery at the Runkstersteenweg around 1930

In 1880, 26-year-old Wilhelmus (Guillaume) Joannes Fryns moved to Hasselt from Mesch, a village in the Dutch province of Limburg, accompanied by his wife Eugénie Mariette, who hailed from Cheratte, a sub-municipality of Visé in the province of Liège. Initially, Guillaume worked in Hasselt as a railway employee. However, by 1885, the archives listed him as a jenever dealer.

In 1890, Guillaume, along with 21-year-old accountant Pierre Léon Leynen, founded the company G. Fryns et Cie. They established their business in the building known as ‘Huis 't Claverblat’ (Cloverleaf House) on Lombaardstraat in Hasselt.

=== Interbellum ===
After the death of Guillaume Fryns Sr in 1909, his widow and eldest son Guillaume Jr carried on the company. In 1913 son Jules also joined the business. After World War I, Guillaume Jr focussed on developing the alcohol and yeast factory in the Canal Basin area of Hasselt, while Jules focussed on the liqueur distillery, which was initially located on Runkstersteenweg and later on Martelarenlaan, in Hasselt. In 1926 the company was renamed Les Anciens Etablissements J. Fryns et Cie. When Guillaume Fryns Jr died in 1932, Jules took over the entire company.

=== After World War II ===
In the 1950s the sons of Jules Fryns joined the business. In 1968 the company name was changed to NV Fryns. From 1979, Fryns was part of the Yoko group, a cheese production company based in Genk. Yoko was taken over by the Irish Dairy Board in 1988. Fryns was sold to Ghent-based beverage group Bruggeman a year later. In 2017 Michel Fryns – part of the fourth generation of Fryns – bought the Fryns brand from Bruggeman and re-established the company on the Ekkelgaarden industrial estate in Hasselt. In 2021 his daughter Céleste also joined this family business.

== Buildings ==
=== Huis 't Claverblat ===
From 1886 to 1908, the Fryns family ran a liqueur factory and fine distillery in Lombaardstraat. The building in which the distillery was located had been known as Huis 't Claverblat (Cloverleaf House) since the 16th century. This building was demolished in 1972. The Fryns Distillery logo, a three-leaf clover, is a reference to this building.

=== Grain distillery and rectifier ===
In 1902 Guillaume Sr Fryns bought livestock sheds on the corner of Paardsdemerstraat and Bonnefantenstraat in Hasselt. In early 1905 he was granted permission to install a steam boiler and equipment for the rectifying (further refining) of alcohol there.

In 1903 Guillaume Fryns Sr took over Maria Leynen’s grain distillery in Meldertstraat in Hasselt. The ‘raw’ distillate from this distillery was taken to the fine distillery in Lombaardstraat for the production of liqueurs, or to the rectifying plant in Bonnefantenstraat where it was distilled into high-grade neutral alcohol.

In around 1914 activities in Bonnefantenstraat and Meldertstraat came to an end. These activities were moved to the distillery in the Canal Basin area of Hasselt.

=== Liqueur distillery on Runkstersteenweg ===
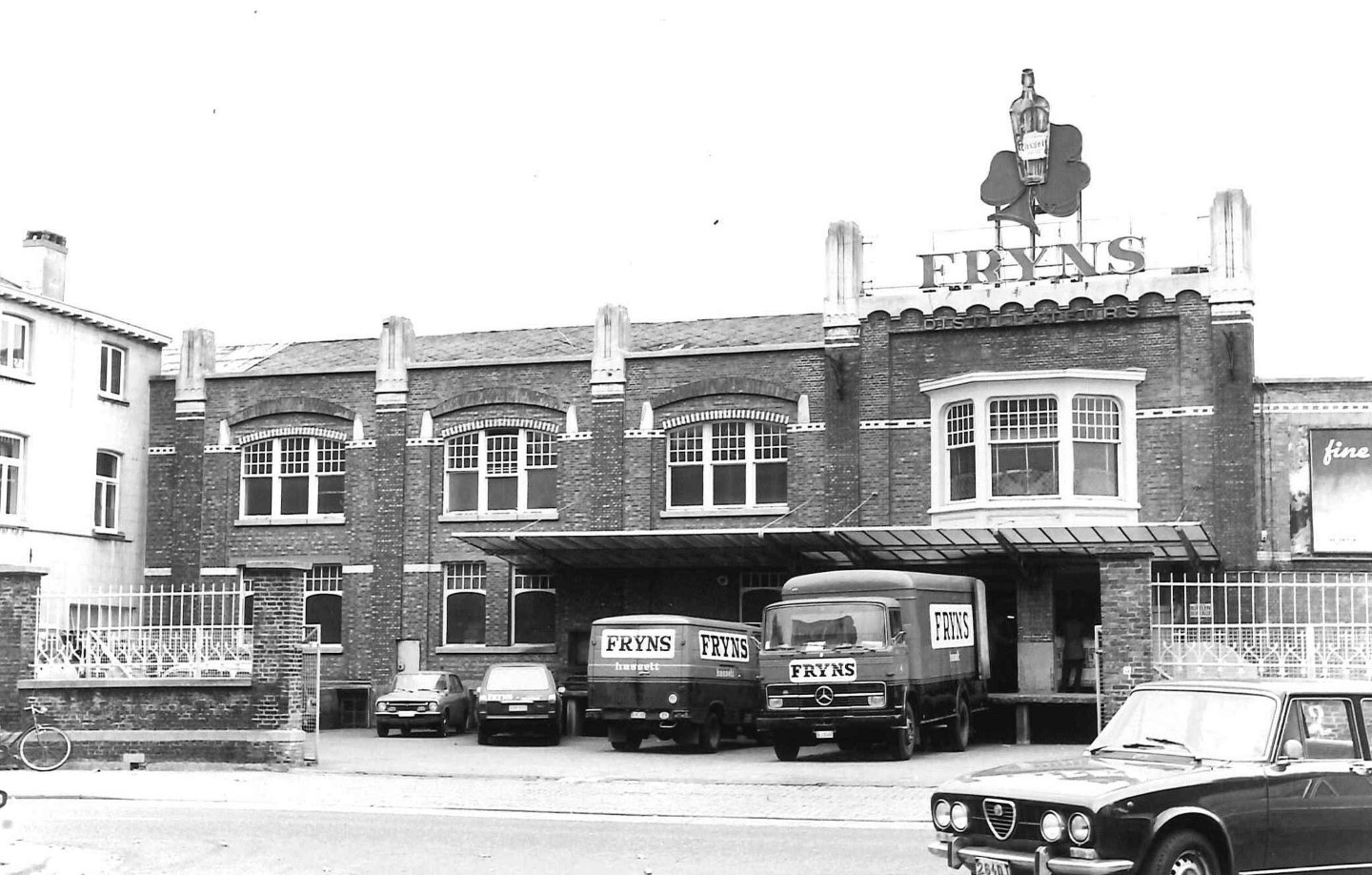
Buildings of Fryns at the Martelarenlaan, 1975

Because the buildings on Bonnefantenstraat and Melderstraat had become too small, Fryns Sr bought a piece of land on Runstersteenweg. In 1908 he started a liqueur distillery there, which moved to new premises on Hasselt’s Martelarenlaan in around 1923.

=== Alcohol distillery in the Canal Basin area ===
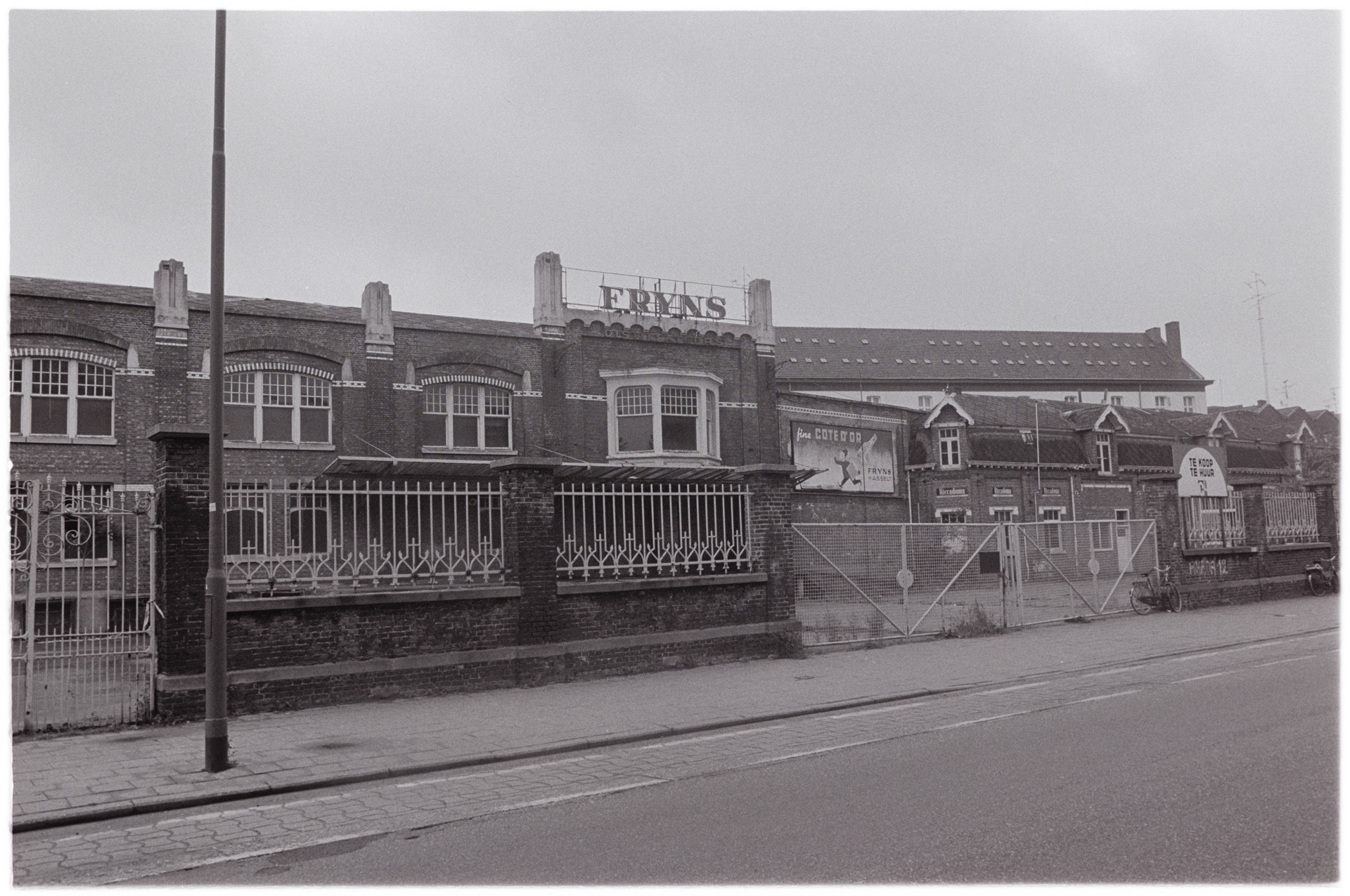
Buildings of the distillery Fryns at the Martelarenlaan, 1985

In September 1913 Eugenie Fryns-Mariette bought the Vinckenbosch distillery and malt house in Hasselt’s Canal Basin area. Guillaume Fryns Jr built a large alcohol distillery there in 1916 and added an ice factory in 1923 and a yeast factory in 1924. The alcohol distillery remained in operation there until 1935. From 1936 onwards the distillery was replaced by a malt house, ‘Malterij Het Klaverblad’. In the 1970s this was completely absorbed into the Alken Brewery. The buildings have meanwhile completely disappeared.

=== Fryns on Martelarenlaan ===
In 1920 brothers Guillaume Jr and Jules Fryns purchased a large site on Martelarenlaan in Hasselt. Jules Fryns built a liqueur factory and a wine business there. When the building on Martelarenlaan became too small, the company moved to a new building on Crutzenstraat in Hasselt in 1980. The building on Martelarenlaan was demolished in 1985.

== Advertising ==
To advertise its jenevers and liqueurs, Fryns had various promotional dishes made by the Hasselt ceramic factory Manufacture de Céramiques décoratives de Hasselt in the period from 1895 to around 1910. These promotional dishes were distributed to cafés by the company’s sales representatives.
