= Fovel =

Fovel is the last remaining distillery in the Brussels Region. It was founded in 1864.

== History ==
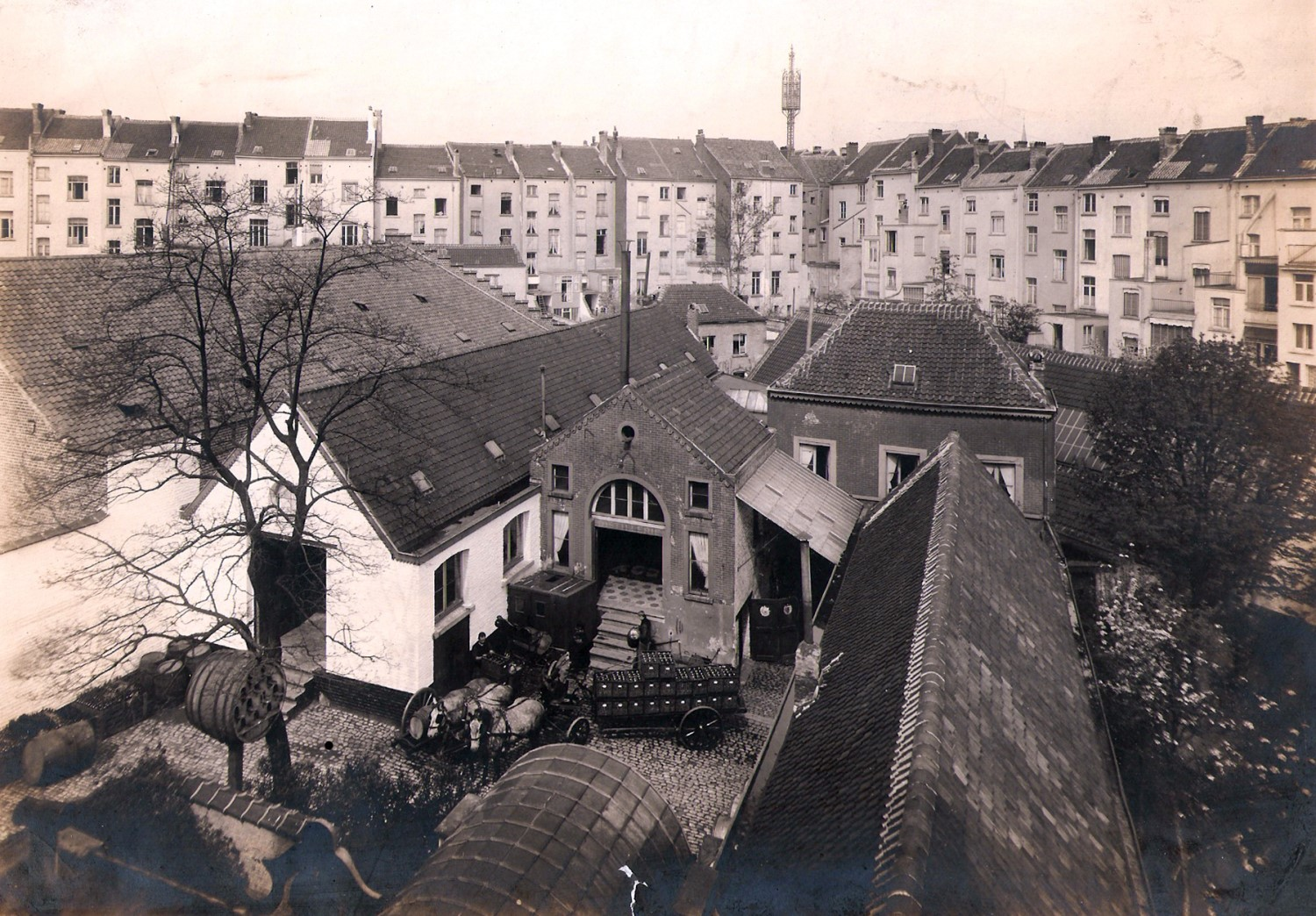

Joseph Fovel, the founder, moved to Brussels in 1864. In 1869 he settled in its municipality Schaarbeek, at 69 Tiéfrystraat, where he founded a distillery. Over the years, its buildings have been adapted to meet changing needs and necessities. An additional floor was added, for instance, to accommodate a taller boiler and heating system. Adjacent buildings were also purchased.

Including ‘Hasselt’ alongside the company name – which was also his family name –was a commercial decision designed to link the brand with the quality that designation implied. By the outbreak of World War I the company had three boilers. Two of these were requisitioned by the occupying Germans. The third was buried in the garden before the Germans saw it and this enabled the company to start up again after the war.

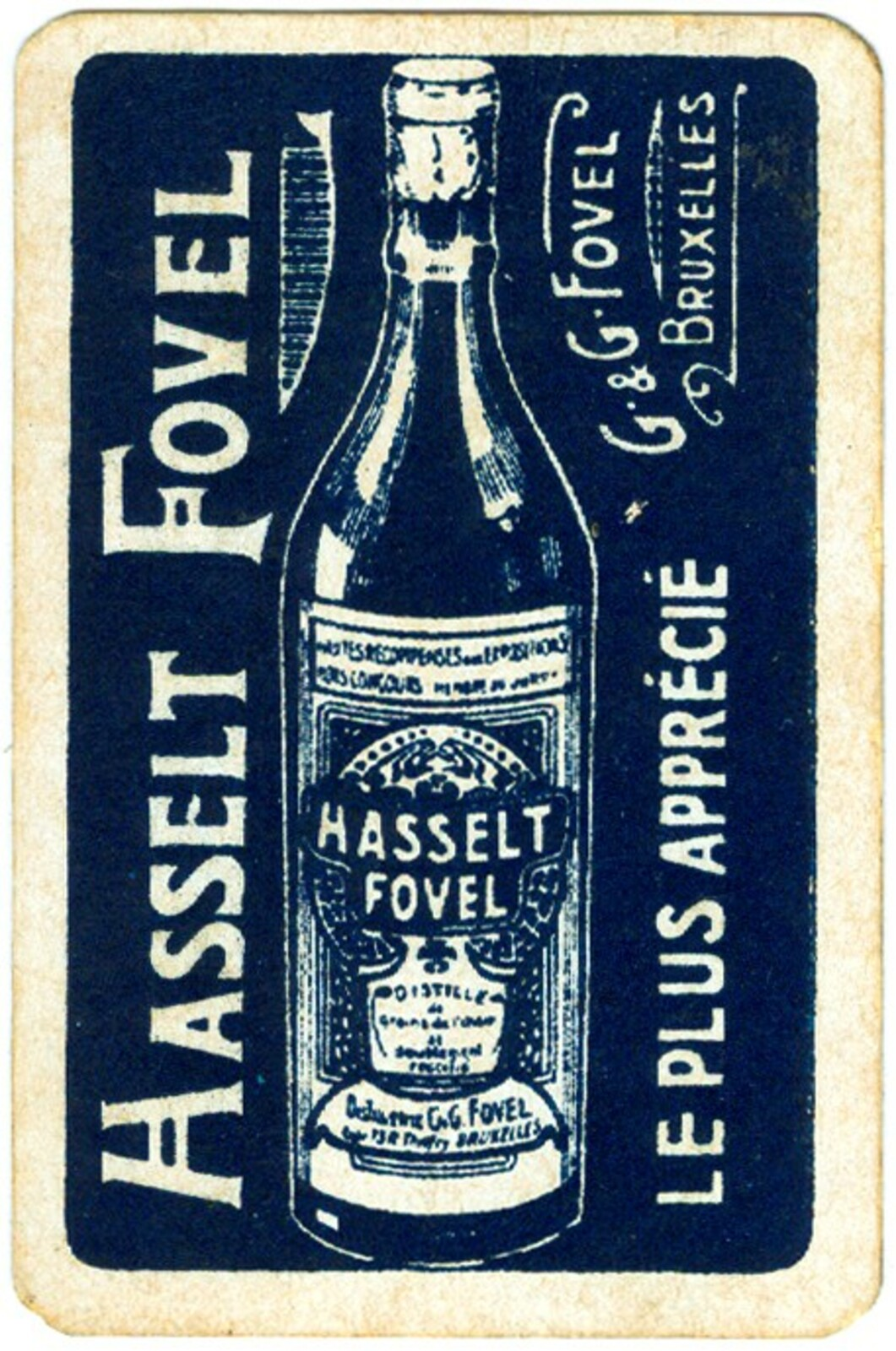
Playing card 'Hasselt Fovel'

Fovel Distillery is still a family business. This has sometimes proved problematic. In 1935, Joseph was succeeded by three of his grandchildren. By the next generation the company had eight owners running it. Their disputes made the company unmanageable and resulted in reduced production. In 1975 one of the eight heirs, Yves Fovel, bought out the others and put the company back on course. In 1979 Brussels celebrated its 1000th anniversary. In honour of this Fovel launched two celebratory new brands: 'Grand-Place', an orange-based liqueur, and 'Manneken Pis', a jenever. Both were a great success and did much to restore the company’s fortunes. Fovel Distillery is now run by Yves’ son Thierry Fovel, together with his own son Diederik, as the fifth and sixth generation.

Fovel still uses its original installations and authentic recipes. Among other things, it distils jenever from the 'Griotte de Schaerbeek', a sour cherry that used to be grown across the municipality. After becoming very rare, that tree is now being reintroduced.

The distillery has a collection of old oak barrels, bottles, paintings and promotional material. Its archives include a collection of family and company photos and the company records. The collection is occasionally opened to visitors.
