= Schaltin Pierry & Cie =

Gin distillery in Belgium

Distillery 'Schaltin, Pierry & Cie' was a Belgian distillery that was founded in 1858 in the Walloon city Spa. One of the distillery's locations was Rue Hanster 8, 4900 Spa.

== History ==
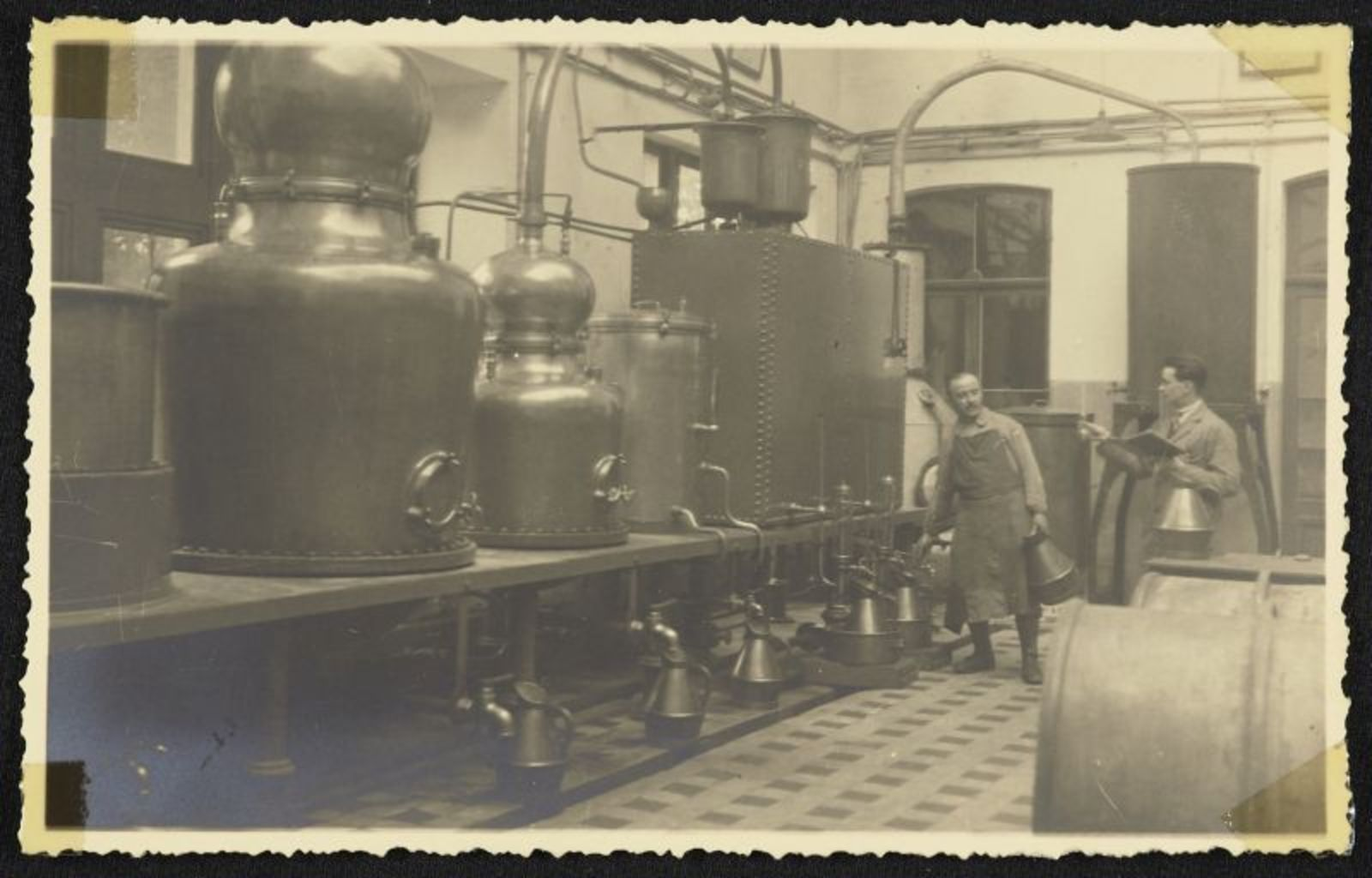

The distillery was founded in 1858 by a Frenchman named Duplais. He is said to have reconstituted the formula of the famous Elixir de Spa, Belgium's oldest elixir. In around 1863, Duplais handed the distillery over to pharmacist Henri Schaltin. From then on it was called Schaltin, Pierry & Cie and it soon started to develop a wide range of products.

The distillery is famous for taking over Elixir de Spa, a drink that had been distilled by Capuchin monks since the 12th century and was based on 40 herbs and plants from the Spa area.

In 1869, the distillery was awarded the title royal warrant holder. This made Henri Schaltin Belgium's first official Purveyor to the Court. The distillery was meanwhile very active on the international market thanks to its dynamic sales policy. It not only exported to several European countries but also to Canada and Russia.

== Transfer of production ==
In 1956 Schaltin, Pierry & Cie decided to stop producing Elixir de Spa. Production of this elixir was taken over by Distillery F.X. De Beukelaar in Antwerp, the start of a new chapter for this venerable Belgian drink.
