= Van de Velde (distillery) =

Former jenever distillery

Distillery Van De Velde, a.k.a. Grain Jenever Distillery Betsberg, is a former jenever distillery in Landskouter (municipality of Oosterzele). The distillery operated for about 175 years, but closed shortly after World War II.

== History ==
According to old advertising material, Den Betsberg agricultural distillery was founded in 1773. A document dated 1801, however, says it was opened by Philippe Janssens in 1752.

When Philippe died, his widow Isabelle Jacoba Billiet married Jacobus Franciscus Van de Velde. Isabelle and Jacobus then ran the distillery together. In 1815 Jacobus was appointed Mayor of Landskouter. This was the start of a long family tradition: that office remained in the family until 1950, when the distillery closed.

In 1822 Jacobus passed the distillery down to his two sons Marcellinus and Charles. Marcellinus bought out his brother and expanded the distillery. When Marcellinus died in 1847, he left the distillery to his son Hippolite Désiré, who in turn passed it down to his son Arthur in 1901.

During World War I, the distillery was forced to close when the Germans requisitioned its copper distillation plant. After the war Arthur installed new equipment and in 1927 opened a completely renovated distillery. In 1928 Arthur's son Jean joined the company.

World War II brought the company once again to a standstill. It was revived briefly after the war, but it closed again in 1950, this time permanently. In 1988 Jean Van De Velde sold off the entire complex.

The exhibition catalogue ‘In en om de alambiek, jenever en alcoholdistilleryen’ says that when demand was high the distillery operated every day of the week. The grain jenever it produced came in three varieties: ‘Jan-ze klaren’ (30°), the ‘Pur seigle’ (35°) and the ‘Pur sang’ (40°). Farming activities and jenever production came to an end in 1948.

== Family ==
In the 20th century the Van de Velde family produced two mayors. Between them they governed Landskouter for almost 70 years. Another outstanding family member was Oblate Priest Frans Van De Velde, who spent more than 50 years with the Eskimos (Inuit) of northern Canada, where he worked as a missionary and an all-round nurse. His work there was so much appreciated that Dutch Princess Margriet – who was born in Canada - came to Landskouter in 1981 to inaugurate a monument in honour of Father Frans Van De Velde. Later in life Father Frans returned to Landskouter where he died in 2002. He now rests in the family burial plot in his native village.

== Building ==
The 18th-century farm and agricultural distillery Betsberg and its surroundings enjoy protected townscape status. The distillery itself has been a protected monument since 1981.

Distilling installations from 1924 are still present. There is also a Cornish steam boiler, by Mahy Frères Wondelgem, from 1907; a horizontal monocylinder steam engine, installed in 1925–1926 to replace a vertical steam engine; three pumps from the 19th century; a distillation column, by Ateliers de Construction Dufour Frères, from 1924; a transfer box by the same manufacturer; a water container; three fermentation vats; a 19th-century “local special” excise duty measuring vessel; two cooling vats; a round cast-iron mixing bowl and a large water tank. In addition to these there are three alcohol storage units and an upstairs grain loft in the warehouse. After restoration, the buildings were divided into a number of residential units.
