= Dumont de Chassart =

- noble family
- Coat of Arms of the family since 1908
- Country: Belgium
- Titles: Baron, mostly jonkheer
- Motto: "Tout Droit"
- Estates: Château de Cognée, Châtelet de Villers-la-Ville

The House Dumont de Chassart is a family of Belgian nobility. They bear the name of the hamlet of Chassart.

== History ==
The family owes its name to the hamlet of the village of Saint-Amand, Chassart. This agricultural locality in the province of Hainaut (Walloon region of Belgium) is where their agro-industrial activities developed. In 1836, the Établissements de Chassart, founded by Auguste Dumont (1794–1876), were established there.

During the 19th century, the Établissements de Chassart developed and modernized. In 1857, a grain distillery was built, and the modernization (installation of electric motors) of the sugar refinery was carried out in 1878. A private railway line was laid in the domain. In the 1880s, a malting plant and yeast factory were established, and new chemical processes were introduced, controlled by laboratories, which allowed for the diversification of activities through the production of fertilizers and the creation of a seed selection unit.

Following this success, the Dumont family was ennobled in 1906 and obtained the right to call themselves Dumont de Chassart in 1908.

In 1963, the family obtained a concession of the title of Baron, transmissible by order of male primogeniture.

== Hunting ==
From 1811 to 2000, the Dumont de Chassart family had one of the few horse-drawn hunting teams in Belgium. This horse-drawn team, named "Chassart Chassant", only hunted hares, the most difficult animal to hunt with hounds.

The team ceased to exist in 2000 with the ban on hunting with hounds in Wallonia.

== Notable members ==
The following individuals belong to this family:

- Auguste Dumont de Chassart (3 October 1859 – 26 August 1921): Belgian Senator, Mayor of Villers-la-Ville.
- Eugène Dumont de Chassart (7 January 1840 – 17 February 1908): Belgian Senator, Member of the Chamber of Representatives of Belgium, Mayor of Marbais.
- Emmanuel Dumont de Chassart (21 October 1901 – 24 July 1944): Mayor of Saint-Amand, leader of the resistance in the southern region of Brabant, and assassinated by collaborators in July 1944.
- Edmond Dumont (24 October 1828 – 20 November 1892): Bishop of Tournai
- Francis Dumont de Chassart (25 November 1936 – 30 June 2008): Municipal Councillor of the city of Fleurus.
- Marjorie Dumont de Chassart (28 November 1990 – ... ): Municipal Councillor of Villers-la-Ville
- Pierre-Emmanuel Dumont de Chassart (20 September 1989 – ... ): Municipal Councillor of Overijse
- Adrien Dumont de Chassart (1 March 2000 – ...) : Professional golfer in the PGA Tour

== See also ==
=== Related articles ===
- List of noble families in Belgium
