= Dumont Frères & Cie =

Dumont Frères & Cie, a.k.a. Etablissements de Chassart, was a Belgian jenever distillery. It was founded by Auguste Dumont (1794-1876) and took its second name from Chassart, a hamlet of the village of Saint-Amand, where it was founded in 1836. This rural location in Hainaut Province (in the Wallonia region of Belgium) was where the company developed its agro-industrial activities.

‘Chassart’ was also the name of the registered brand of jenever produced at this location. It featured prominently on its bottle labels.

The company was also known for the cultivation of beets, its sugar refinery, its malting plant and the production of vinegar, yeast and fertilisers. It was a prime example of a large farm that developed into a sizeable agro-industrial enterprise in less than a century.

The company ceased operating in 1968 and filed for bankruptcy.

== History ==
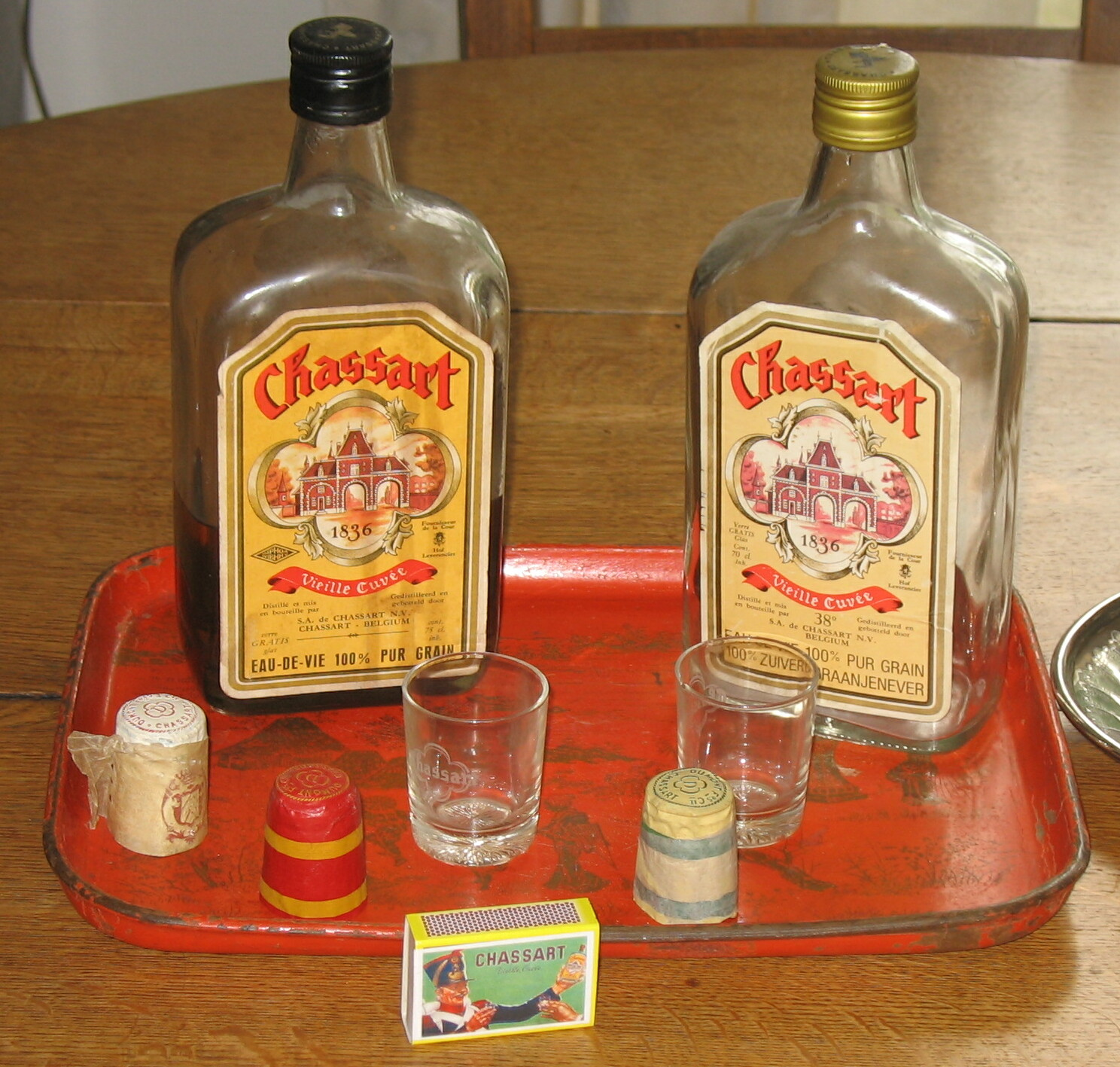
Bottle of jenever Chassart

In 1826 Auguste Dumont acquired an agricultural estate of about 100 hectares to grow sugar beet (this was the Chassart farm domain, managed by the Villers Abbey until 1797, but then confiscated during the French Revolution and subsequently sold to retired lawyer Antoine Léonard Jackmart, who in turn resold it). Auguste Dumont built a first distillery here in 1833 and a sugar refinery in 1836. He established himself as an industrial distiller when he founded his company in 1836. The name Guillaume Dumont (Auguste’s brother, a Belgian politician and ironmaster) appears in Établissements de Chassart’s list of directors.

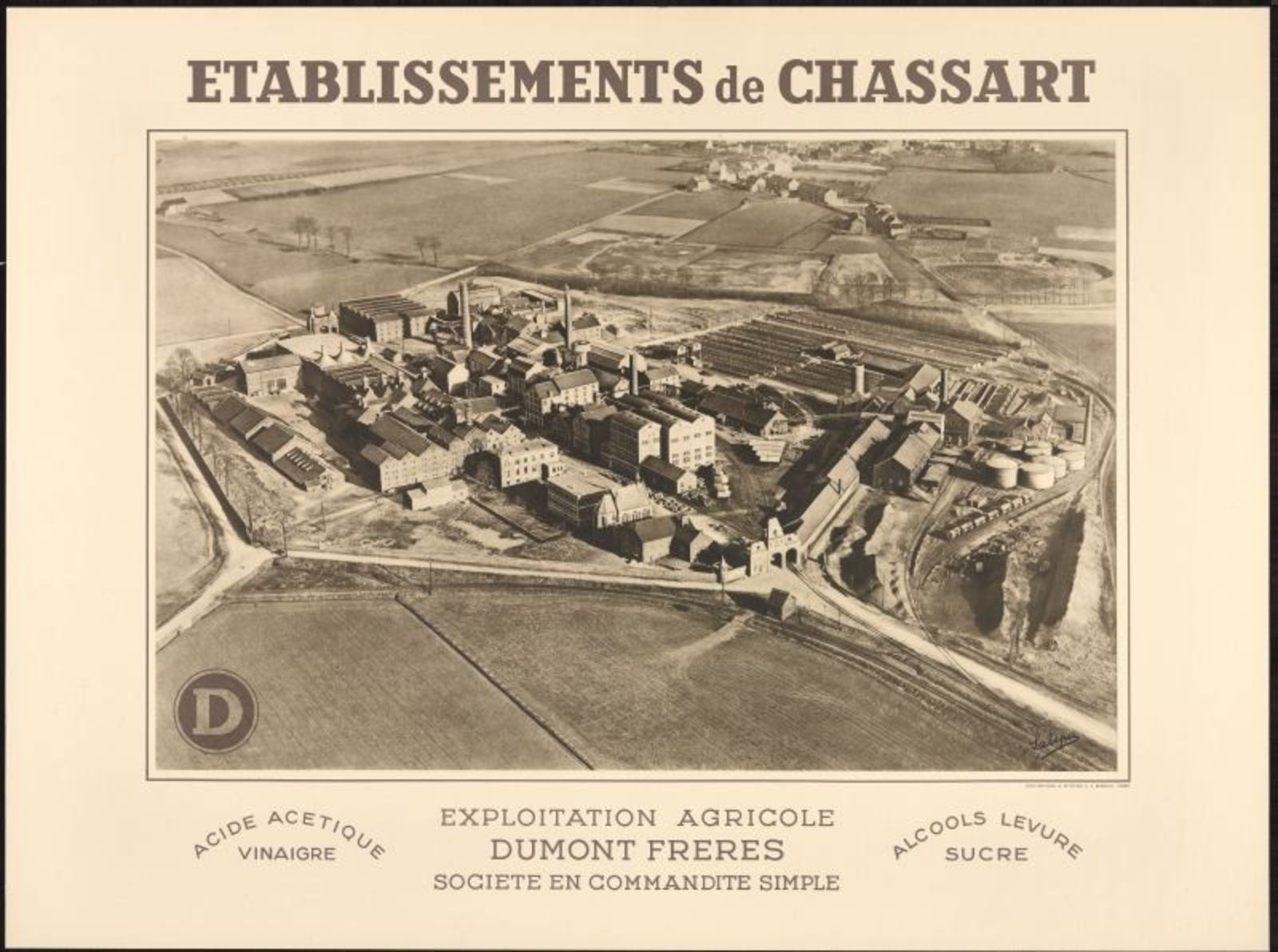
Poster 'Etablissement de Chassart', ca.1939-1940

In 1852 Léopold Dumont succeeded his father as managing director of the company. He transformed it into a modern agro-industrial complex, devoted to the integrated processing of a variety of products. He expanded the domain by acquiring 400 hectares of land and merging farms. In 1857 he built a grain distillery and in 1878 modernised the sugar refinery by installing electric motors. A private railway line was also laid in the area. During the 1880s, a malt house and a yeast factory were put into operation. New chemical processes, controlled by laboratories, were also introduced, which allowed the company to diversify its activities. In those days, these laboratories were in contact with the newly founded agronomic institute in Gembloux and with foreign organic chemistry institutes (where French chemists Jean-Baptiste Dumas and Augustin-Pierre Dubrunfaut were consulted). In 1890 Etablissements de Chassart acquired a vast estate in Tunisia (then a French protectorate) called Chassart-Tefaha. An agricultural school was opened there for the improvement of the cultivation of cereals and the planting of vines.

When Léopold died in 1902, his nephew Gabriël Dumont (1870-1925) took over the management of the company. In 1896, with a view to simplifying its management, the company became a limited partnership under the name Dumont Frères & Cie. New investments were made: a vinegar factory was opened in 1903, an alcohol plant was added in Chassart and it was decided to set up a yeast factory in Prouvy, in the north of France (in 1912).

In 1906 the Dumont family were ennobled and given permission to add the designation ‘de Chassart’ to the name Dumont.

World War I severely disrupted production at Établissements Dumont de Chassart. In 1925 the founder's great-grandsons, Léopold Dumont de Chassart (1894-1976) and Emmanuel Dumont de Chassart (1901-1944), took over management of the company, whereupon output improved and eventually reached its peak. In those days the company was producing crystallised sugar, grain alcohol, yeast, vinegar, potash, acetic acid and lucerne meal (alfalfa meal). The company decided to expand its market by launching three jenevers: Vieille Cuvée, Cuvée Spéciale and Chassart 34° despite the decline in alcohol consumption as a result of the Vandervelde Act of 1919 and the general increase in living standards.

World War II once again severely disrupted industrial activities. By the end of the war the company had lost its competitiveness, despite replenishing its funds after resuming yeast production to provide for the US army. A delay in modernising production units and a problematic transition to new markets jeopardised new growth. The utilisation of external capital proved complicated and self-financing was discouraged, as it had been during the 1929 world economic crisis, which further aggravated the situation. Unable to withstand global competition, the sugar refinery further declined and in 1957 was sold off to the Tienen Sugar Refinery. The distillery did not survive much longer. Competitive new products appeared on the market, especially the whisky imported by the Americans after the war. The Dumont de Chassart family sold the patent for Chassart Vieille Cuvée to Martini & Rossi in 1968. The nationalisation of production plants in Tunisia also had serious financial consequences. After a period of yeast production, the Chassart factory was converted into a bottling plant. This was closed down in 1977.

== Archives ==
Since 1985 the Etablissements de Chassart archives have been entrusted to the Free University of Brussels, VUB/ULB, by members of the family. An inventory has been drawn up and published.

== Distillery ==
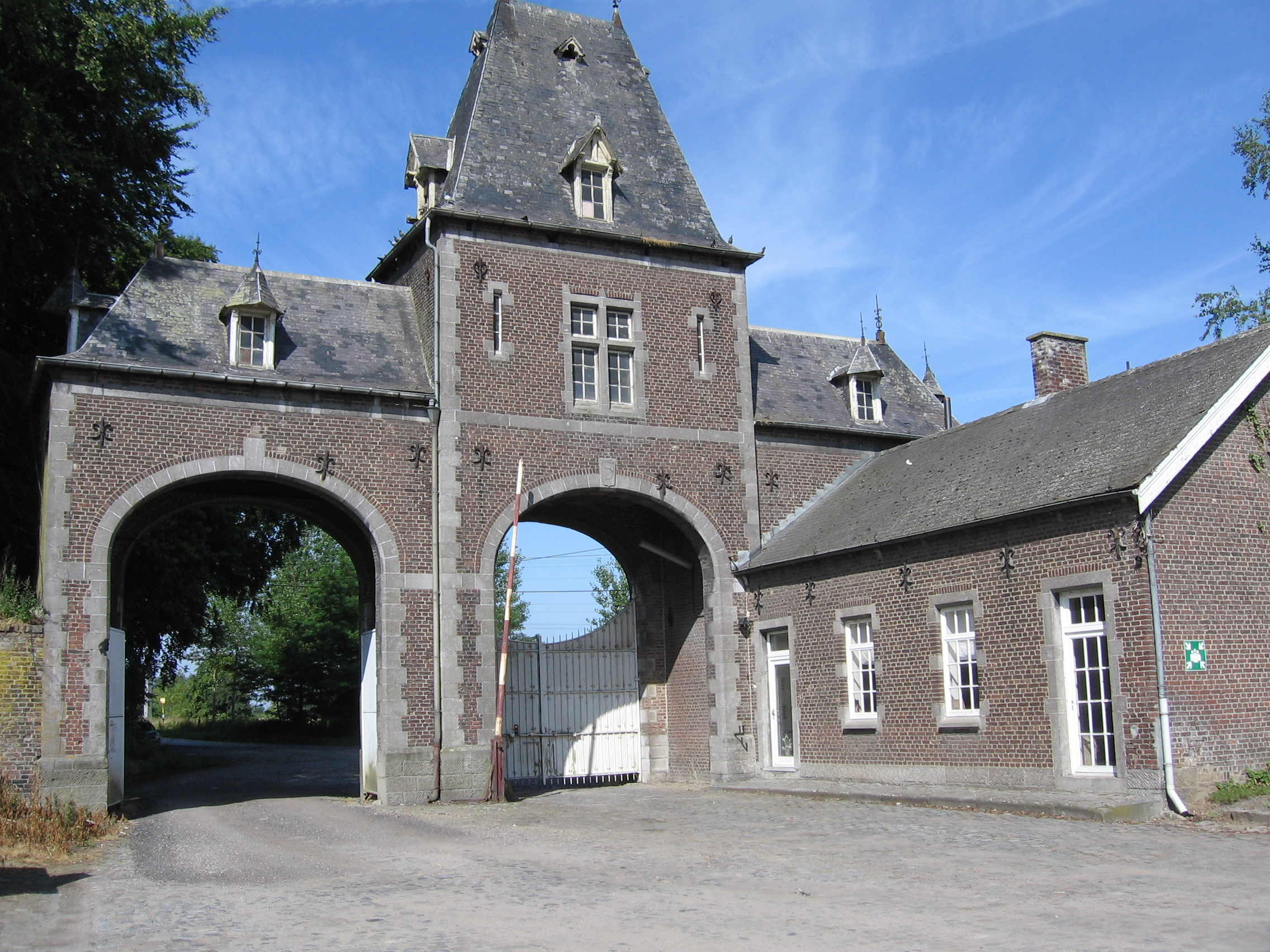

The first distillery was founded around 1836 together with the first sugar refinery. The Genièvre de Chassart brand was officially registered at the Clerk’s Office of the Commercial Court in 1930. Chassart’s storage, distribution and marketing were done from a satellite site, located in the Brussels region. The logo printed on bottle labels depicts the gateway to the Chassart factory site. This is the only logo that was used. The distillery’s best-known product was Vieille Cuvée. There were two other variants: Cuvée Spéciale and Chassart 34°. All three were based on grain alcohol. Chassart jenever was Etablissements Chassart’s signature brand, used to promote the company's name and visibility, but it only represented a small part of the company’s production range. When the company filed for bankruptcy in 1968, its jenever producing arm survived. The Martini Rossi company acquired the patent and took over production and marketing. In 1989 the company Bruggeman took over production and distribution. Bruggeman switched from distilling jenever to distilling gin, a derivative product. They called it ‘Chassart Gin’.

== Production units ==
The products developed by the company embrace a wide range of agri-food expertise, from engineering and operations, to sales and distribution.

● Cultivation of grains and sugar beet

● Vinegar, acetic acid production

● Distilling

● Malting

● Lucerne meal production

● Potash, yeast and fertiliser production
