= De Moor (distillery) =

Gin distillery in Belgium

Coordinates: 50°56′26″N 4°00′21″E

De Moor is a family-owned distillery located in Aalst, Belgium, producing gins and liqueurs. It is one of the last warm grain distilleries in Belgium.

== History ==
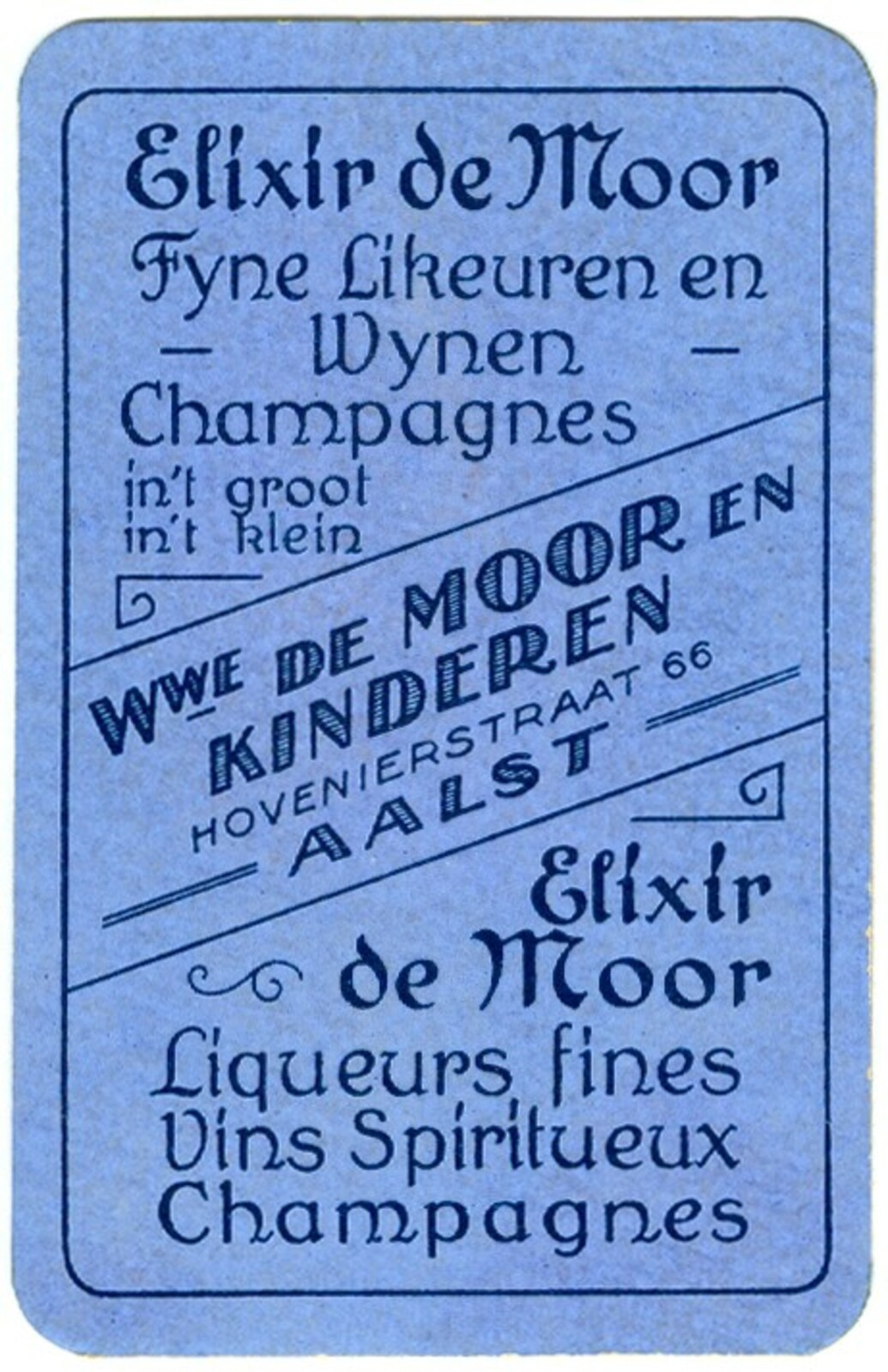
Playing card Elixir de Moor

In 1910, Frans De Moor and his wife Anna Lafon founded a distillery in Drie Sleutelstraat in Aalst. The couple occupied three adjoining houses in that street. One housed the distillery. The house next door was converted into a shop, where they sold the jenevers, liqueurs they produced, and other spirits and wines. The third house was the couple's residence.

At the beginning of World War I, in September 1914, Frans was killed as part of a reprisal by the invading German troops near Aalst's Zwarte Hoek Bridge. The killing of Frans and other hostages was an act of bloody revenge for the stubborn resistance of the Belgian army in Aalst and along the river Dender. 'The Germans advanced along Drie Sleutelstraat from their positions at Mijlbeek and encountered heavy resistance from the Belgian Army. In anger, they forced entry into the houses and drove the residents out into the street, where they used them as a human shield. Frans and other residents were hiding in the cellar. When the Germans found them, Frans protested and was hit on the head with a rifle butt. Out in the street he was again beaten with rifle butts and then bayoneted.' After the death of Frans the distillery was continued by his widow, his son Albert and his daughter-in-law Maria.

In the late 1950s, Albert's son Gilbert and his wife Eliane took over the distillery. During this period, the basis for the current range was laid.

In 1985 Albert and Eliane's daughter Greet and her husband Patrick Van Scandevijl – the fourth generation – took over and expanded the distillery. In 1992, the shop was moved to a new location on the Gentsesteenweg. A few years later, in 1999, the distillery was renovated. Greet and Patrick's daughter Carolien joined the family business in 2012.

== Products ==
The distillery produces jenevers such as Diep 9 Genever and liqueurs such as Gin 20-3. It also endeavours to offer a complete range of wines and hard-to-find spirits and products. It also organises tastings and provides advice and personalised service. During the COVID-19 pandemic restrictions, tastings were replaced by 'wine tasting at home', with a selection of wine samples delivered to customers.
