= Filliers =

Gin distillery in Belgium

Filliers Grain Distillery is a jenever distillery in Bachte-Maria-Leerne (Deinze) in East Flanders, Belgium.

== Five generations ==
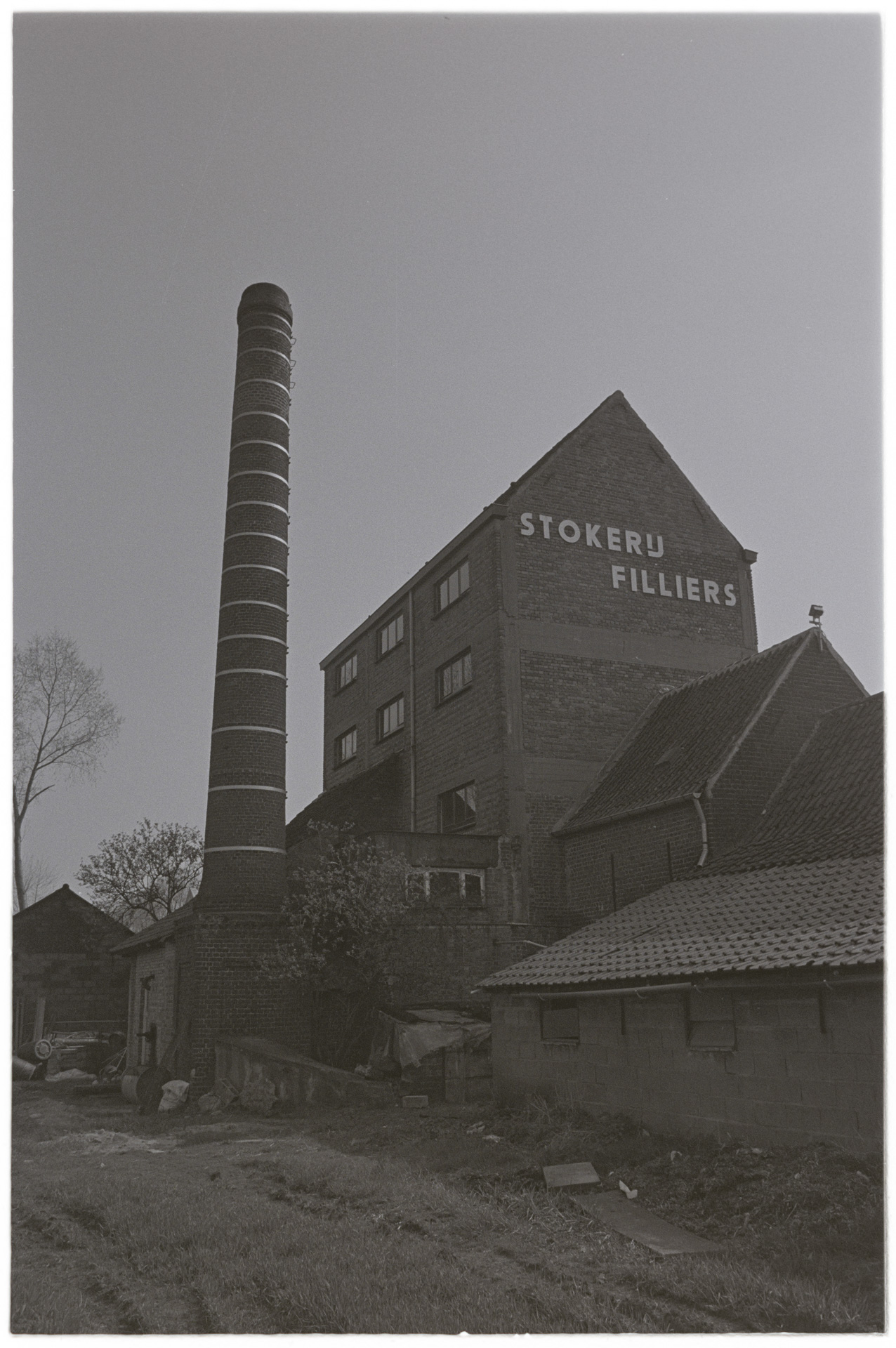

The company was founded around 1880 by Kamiel Filliers, when he was granted a permit to distil jenever on his farm. This allowed him to make jenever in the winter, using grain he had grown on his own farm. This activity replaced the agricultural distillery set up by his uncle Ferdinand Bernard Filliers, which had been damaged by fire in 1863.

In the interwar years the third generation took the reins in the person of Firmin Filliers. After World War II, his sons Louis and Carlos Filliers took over.

From 1980, the company was managed by the fifth generation, nephews Jan and Bernard Filliers. Since 2018 the management has been in the hands of Bernard Cnudde from Oudenaarde.

== Products ==
In 1928, after World War I, Firmin Filliers developed the first Belgian gin recipe. In 2010 Filliers used this recipe when it became the first Belgian distillery to market gin: Filliers Dry Gin 28.

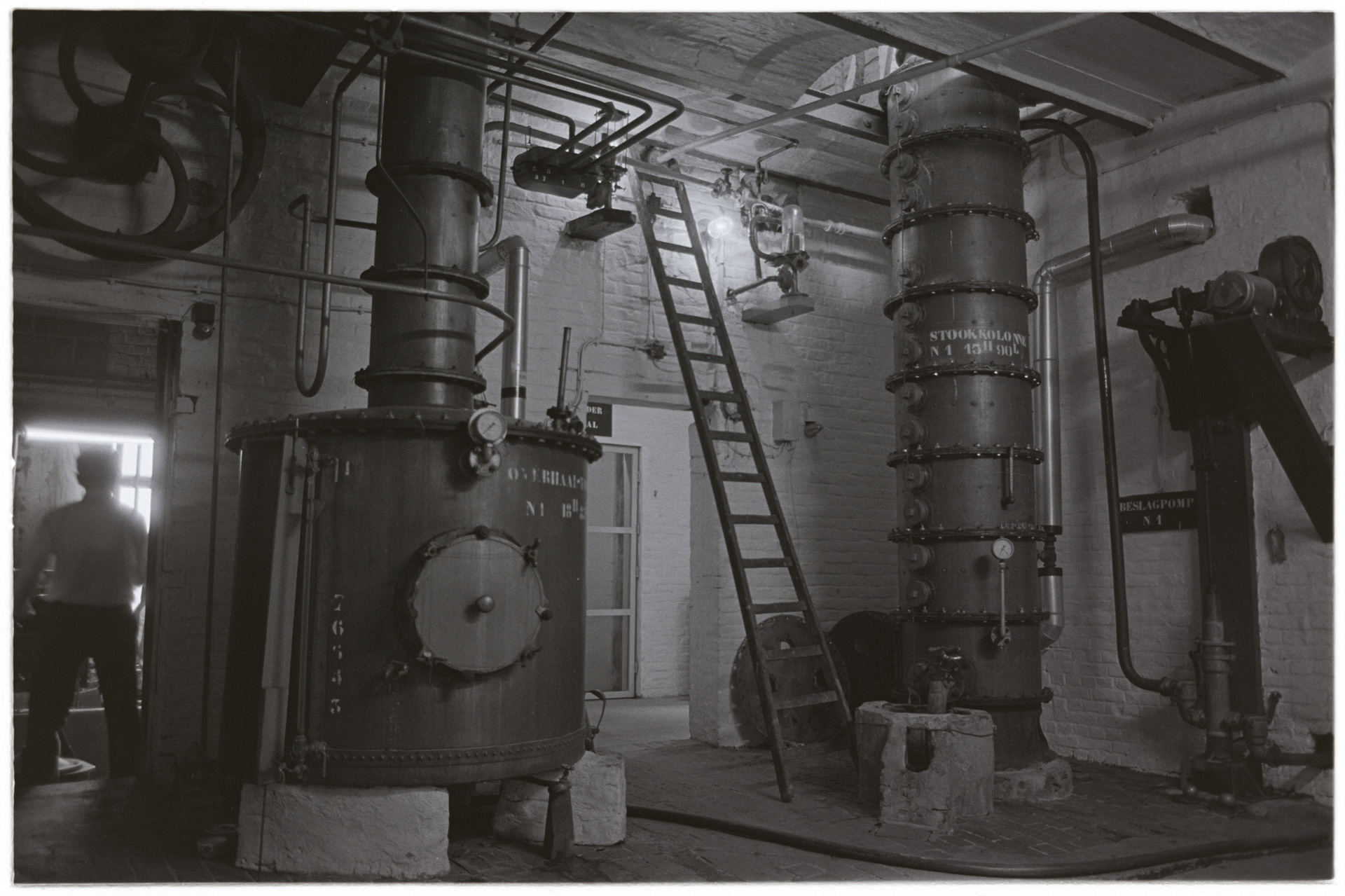

After the disruption of World War II, Filliers made a fresh start. Its copper installation, which had been hidden from the Germans in a tributary of the Leie, was recovered and distilling recommenced.

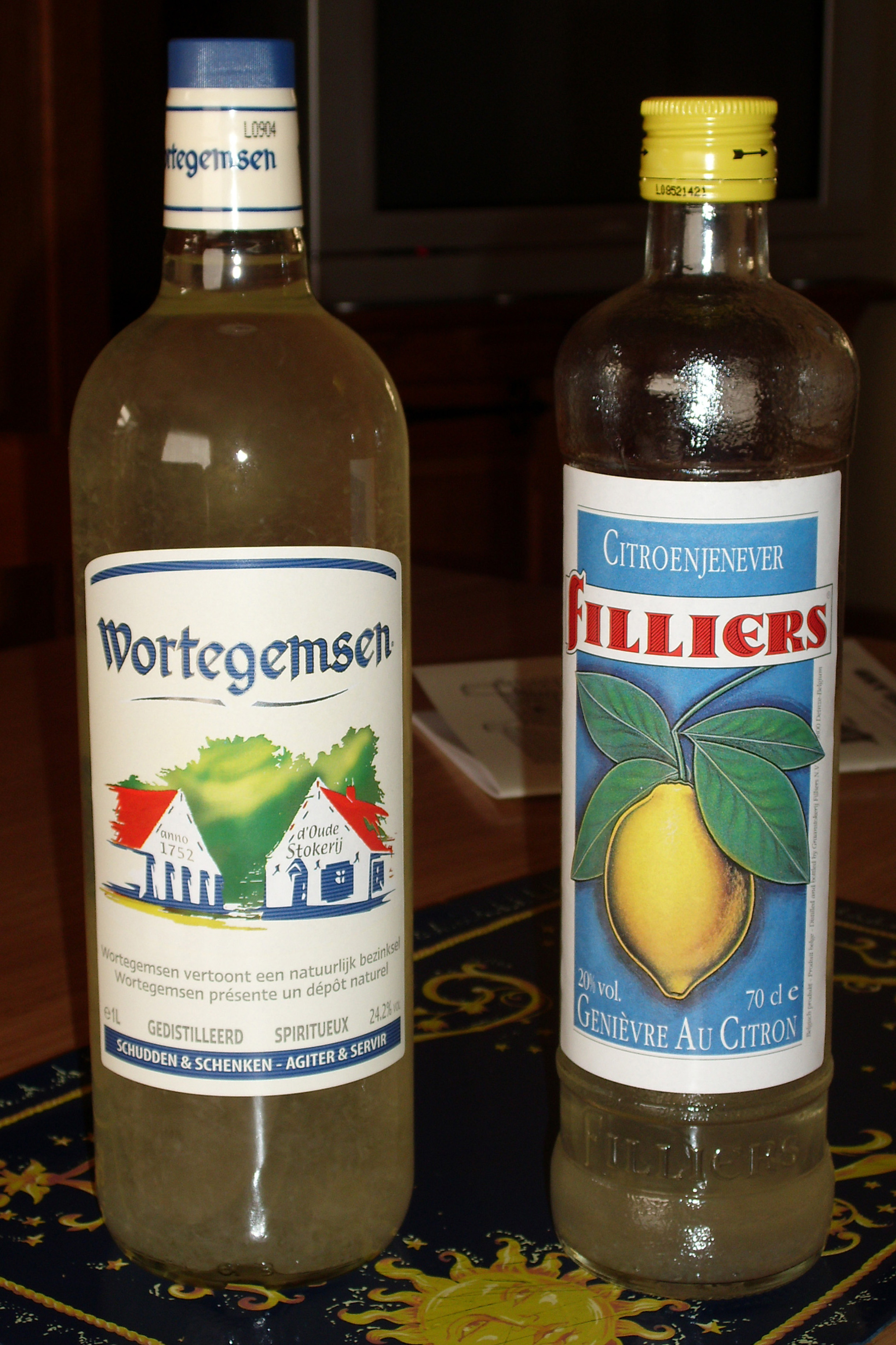

Until 1975 Filliers continued to be an agricultural distillery, with a complete ecological cycle, in which the spent grain remaining after distillation was used as cattle feed and the cattle's manure was used to fertilise the land. After 1975 agricultural activities were phased out and the production of grain jenever was increased using purchased grain.

At around this time, the range of products was expanded. In 1970 Filliers launched an advocaat, based on the recipe of Julia Denecker, widow of the late Firmin Filliers. Fruit-flavoured jenevers were also introduced. These were later followed by cream-jenevers, with flavours such as chocolate, vanilla, coconut, banana and amaretto.

In 2009 Filliers took over Wortegemsen – the Waregem-based distillery of lemon jenever – previously owned by Albert Kint. This made Filliers the Belgian market leader in the jenever segment and increased its turnover to 18 million euros.

Another evolution was the production from 2007 of Filliers’ own brand of single malt whisky: Goldlys Family Reserve. This was produced by double column distillation. It is a three-year-old grain whisky, matured in American oak Bourbon barrels. The name is a reference to the nearby river Leie.

Filliers also produces semi-finished malt spirit, a pure grain distillate of up to 46-47% vol. This is sold in bulk to other jenever producers in the Benelux and Canada, including the Dutch company Bols.

== Accident ==
On 31 October, 2008, manager and master distiller Jan Filliers was killed in a bus accident in southern Egypt. Jan, his wife and four children were on their way to Abu Simbel. Five other Belgians were also killed in the accident.

Barely a month before the accident, Jan Filliers had been named one of the ten most influential inhabitants of Deinze by the newspaper Het Nieuwsblad. Jan Filliers was regarded as one of that city's key figures. He was described as a jovial man who always took the time to give visitors a tour of the distillery he was so proud of.

In Jan Filliers’ memory a Corporate Social Responsibility (CSR) foundation was set up and named after him. This foundation was wound up in 2022.

== Building ==
The original distillery site has been listed as architectural heritage since 1991.

In 1996, a Filliers copper distilling column was reconstructed as a monument in the company. The architect of this five-metre-high construction was Xavier Donck.
