= Bruggeman (distillery) =

Gin distillery in Belgium

Bruggeman is a distillery company located in Ghent. It produces Hertekamp jenever.

== History ==
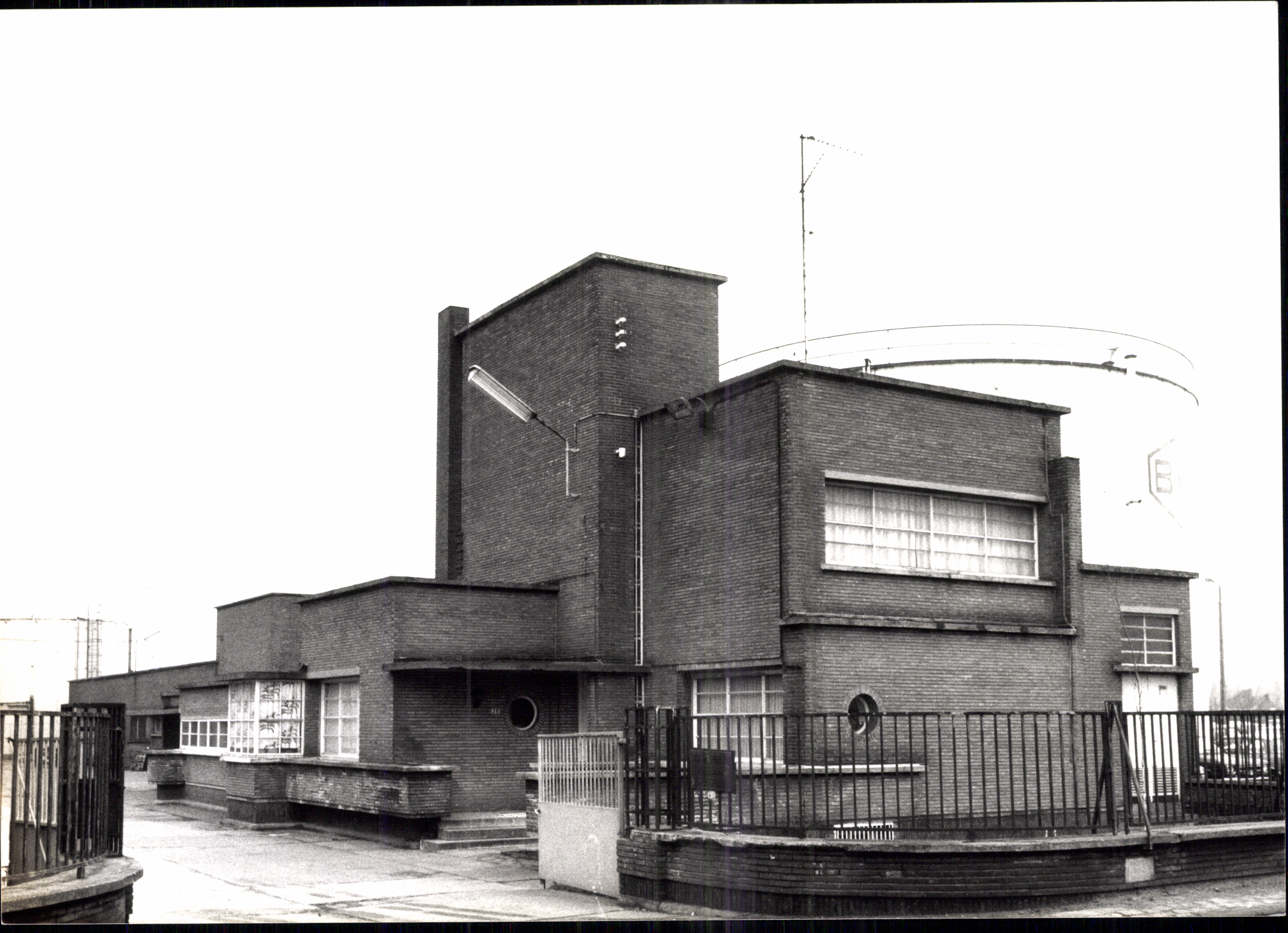
Factory Buildings of Bruggeman at Langerbruggekaai 37

In 1884 Pieter Bruggeman started trading in wines and liqueurs in the De Muide district of Ghent. He named his business De Noordpool (The North Pole). In 1924 his daughter Anaïs Bruggeman married Louis De Schepper, the son of the brewer at Brouwerij De Schepper (Ghent). Louis brought his experience with him to De Noordpool and the company started to produce its own spirits via distillation. To facilitate this, the company moved to the buildings of the former Van Goethem Brewery, also called ‘Het Sleutelken’, which were located in Grauwpoort, a street named after Ghent’s former north-west gate.

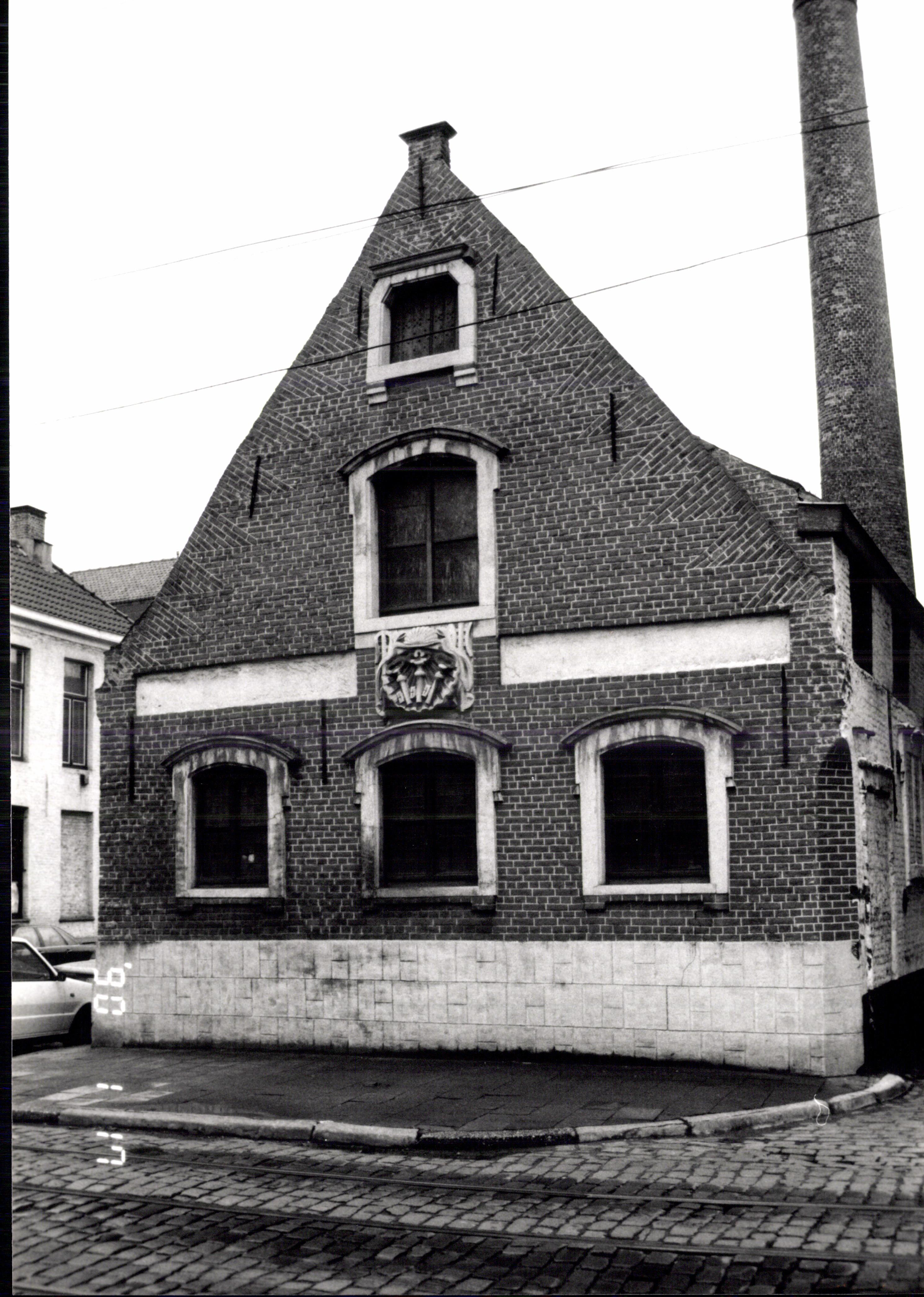
Brewery Het Sleutelken

Subsequent increases in production meant that alcohol suppliers could no longer meet Bruggeman's needs. Moreover, the installation was outdated. In 1941 a new grain distillery, designed by architect J. Lippens, was therefore built at Langerbrugge, in Ghent’s Canal Zone. In 1946 an extension was added and from then on the company also produced its own brewing yeast and regular baker's yeast. An industrial molasses distillery was added in 1952.

When Louis De Schepper died in 1956, the company was continued by his widow and the couple’s two sons Joseph and André De Schepper. Anaïs Bruggeman died in 1987. In that same year, the new production unit on Wiedauwkaai began to distil.

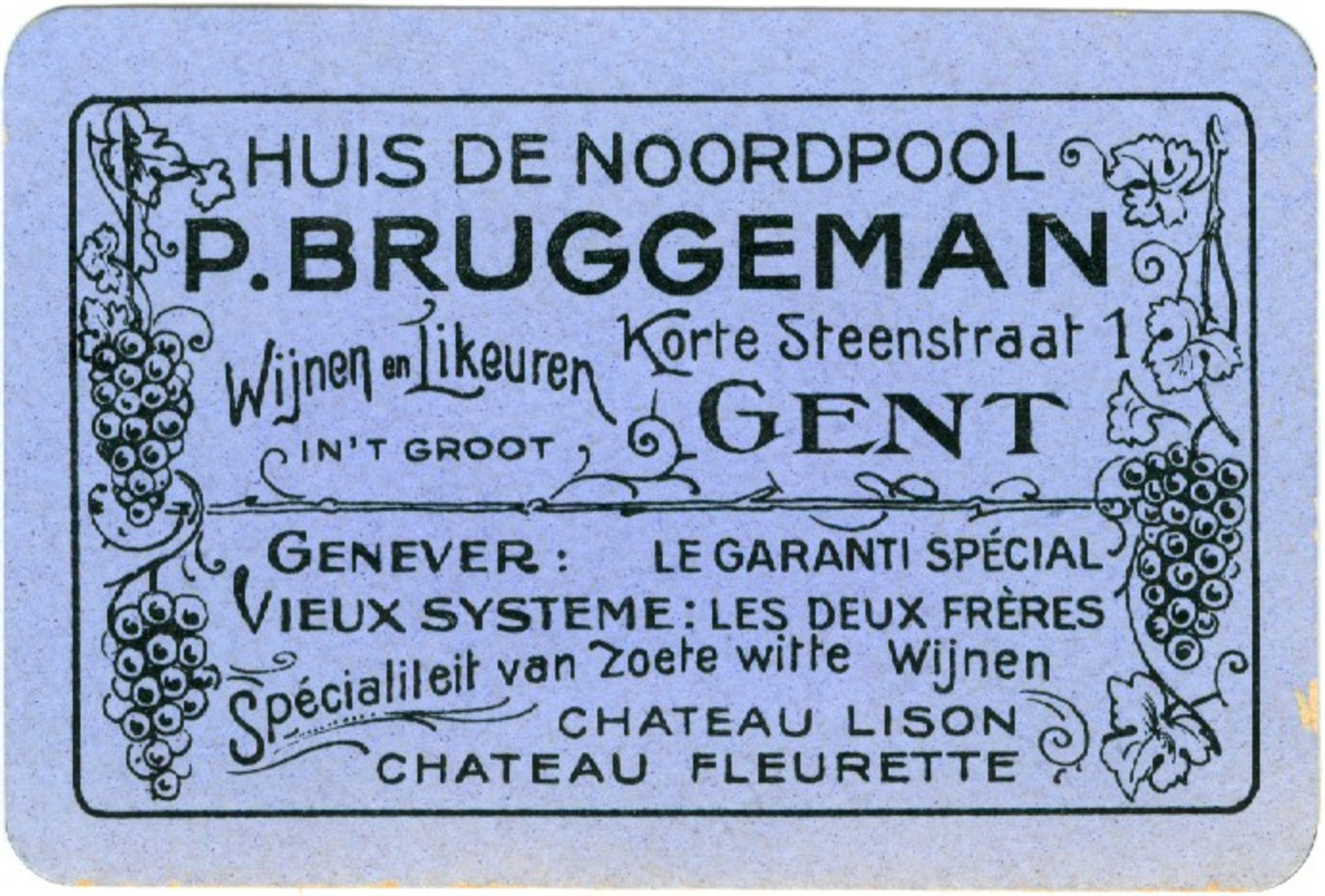
Playing Card 'Huis de Noordpool, P. Noordpool'

In 1988 Bruggeman took over the Hasselt distillery Fryns, but sold it again in 2018. Since 2011 Bruggeman has been the owner of the other Hasselt jenever brand Smeets. This acquisition made it the Belgian market leader of grain jenevers. Other jenever brands were also acquired. Bruggeman now owns the jenevers Peterman, Smeets, Hertekamp, Olifant and Goblet, plus a diverse range of other alcoholic and non-alcoholic beverages. It acquired Ainslie's Whisky (Scotland) in 1998 for instance, and La Martiniquaise (Poliakov, Label 5, Canadou) (France) in 2009.

Since 2009, Bruggeman has been part of the French group La Martiniquaise.
