= De Beukelaer (distillery) =

Gin distillery in Belgium

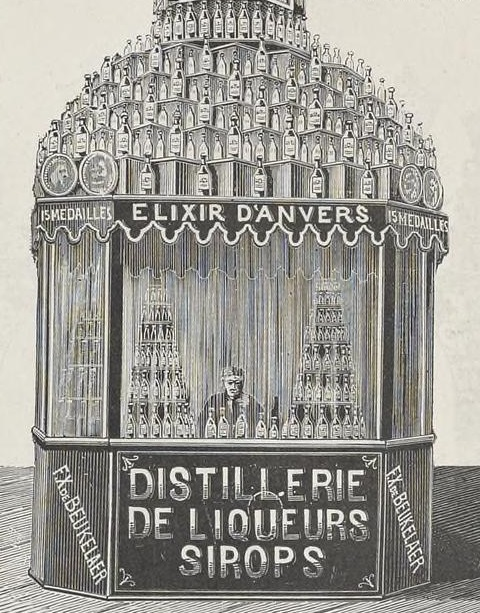
FX de Beukelaer and Elixir d'Anvers in the catalogue of the World Exposition of 1885

The De Beukelaer distillery (or FX De Beukelaer, sometimes with a small 'de'), is a Belgian family-owned liqueur distillery, located in the Haantjeslei in the Zuid neighborhood of Antwerp. De Beukelaer is known for its elixirs, the Elixir d'Anvers and the Elixir de Spa.

== History ==
=== Origin and growth ===
François-Xavier de Beukelaer was active as a wine merchant for several years. In 1870 he opened a liqueur distillery in Antwerp’s Bredastraat. In that same year, he registered his Elixir d'Anvers, a herbal liqueur he had perfected. It has been distilled ever since, according to a fixed recipe. The company took its Elixir d'Anvers to the Antwerp International Exhibition (1885).

Because demand kept increasing, de Beukelaer bought land on Haantjeslei. The property included a small castle and accompanying parkland. In 1894, the current company buildings were built in the Flemish neo-Renaissance style, to plans drawn up by architect Jules Hofman. Elixir d'Anvers is still distilled there. The official name of the company is ‘NV FX De Beukelaer’. The building also bears the name ‘F.X. de Beukelaer’, after the company’s founder. The company was incorporated on 1 February 1909.

On the eve of World War I, the distillery employed 60 to 80 people.

The company motto was 'Uti, non abuti' ('use, but don't abuse').

=== Collaboration and acquisitions ===
In 1956 De Beukelaer took over Elixir de Spa. This elixir is much older than Elixir d'Anvers. Its maker was Belgium’s first royal warrant holder (Purveyor to the Court).

In 2005, a collaboration was begun with the St-Pol grain distillery in Kortrijk, but this grain distillery was declared bankrupt in 2014. De Beukelaer purchased the St.-Pol brand name in 2007, so it is still produced, but nowadays in Antwerp.

=== Protection of the premises ===
In 2009 the building at 132 Haantjeslei was placed on the Architectural Heritage Inventory. On 25 September 2018 this was followed by provisional protection as a monument. The protection of the building and some of the production resources were put in place because of various heritage values:

- cultural value: many liqueur distilleries sprang up in the second half of the 19th century, particularly in Antwerp. With its elixir, De Beukelaer is a typical example of this and a testimony to the changing taste of that period.
- historical value: in the 18th century there were many small-scale jenever distilleries. By 1885 the five largest Antwerp distilleries were responsible for 27% of Belgian jenever production. De Beukelaer was part of this.
- industrial-archaeological value: the entire liqueur distilling process has been retained at the company, from the initial processing of ingredients to the maturing of the end product in oak barrels and finally bottling. Old installations have been preserved.
- architectural value: the Flemish neo-Renaissance style was typical of the last quarter of the 19th century and of architect Jules Hofman’s work at that time (he later became a renowned Art Nouveau architect). Characteristics of the Flemish neo-Renaissance style is the stepped gables, layers of natural white stone, red brick, and blue stone. The director's office in the building was also decorated in this style, including, among other things, herringbone parquet and leaded windows.

== Management ==
For a long time, company founder François-Xavier de Beukelaer managed the business. When it was officially incorporated in 1909, it was registered in the names of his wife and their two sons Emile and Louis-Xavier de Beukelaer. After World War I the sons were given full control. François-Xavier de Beukelaer died in 1917. His son Emile De Beukelaer died in 1922, from influenza, after which Louis-Xavier de Beukelaer took the reins, together with his sons Balthazar-Xavier and Jean and Emile’s son Edmond de Beukelaer.

In 1941, Louis-Xavier de Beukelaer retired. His sons and nephew ran the company until World War II, during which Balthazar-Xavier de Beukelaer was killed by a V2 bomb that fell on his home. After World War II Distillery De Beukelaer passed fully into the hands of Edmond de Beukelaer, who was subsequently joined by his sons Emile and Jacques. When Edmond de Beukelaer died in 1969, his son Emile de Beukelaer took over the company management. His brother Jacques also remained involved and had a seat on the board of directors. Jacques de Beukelaer retired in the 1990s, but he continued to visit the distillery regularly until 2012 when a company secretary accused him of sexual harassment. In May 2013 he was granted a stay of proceedings after he sent the secretary a letter of apology and paid €750.

In 1998 Ivan Nolet de Brauwere – a member of an old and ennobled distilling family – was appointed CEO of the distillery. Emile de Beukelaer, the last member of the de Beukelaer family to be involved in the distillery, remained active on the board of directors until 2008 when he completely withdrew from the company. The company was then bought by the Nolet de Brauwere family.

== Purveyor to the Court ==
When De Beukelaer acquired Elixir de Spa, it was allowed to take over that company’s royal warrant and the title of Purveyor to the Court. It retained this title until 2008, the year that Emile de Beukelaer withdrew from the company. The title Purveyor to the Court was in Emile’s name and after he left it elapsed and was not renewed.

== Products ==
The distillery initially only produced Elixir d'Anvers, but over the years it expanded its range a little to include:

- Elixir d'Anvers, since 1863
- Snaps: jenever, since 1904, distilled by François-Xavier de Beukelaer
- Triple sec
- Elixir de Spa, since 1956
- Bökland: vodka and fruit vodka, since 1996
- St-Pol: grain jenever, since 2007
- Elixir d'Anvers Advocaat: advocaat, produced since 2015
- Koffie Elixir d'Anvers: coffee liqueur

== Business performance ==
The products of Distillery De Beukelaer are mainly sold in Belgium and the surrounding countries. Almost half a million bottles are sold every year. In 2014, the company achieved a turnover of three million euros, but due to an increase in the excise duty on spirits, the price of the elixir rose and sales dropped by twelve percent. The number of employees subsequently fell from twelve in 2014 to eight in 2016.
