= Jenever =

French, Dutch and Belgian juniper-flavoured liquor

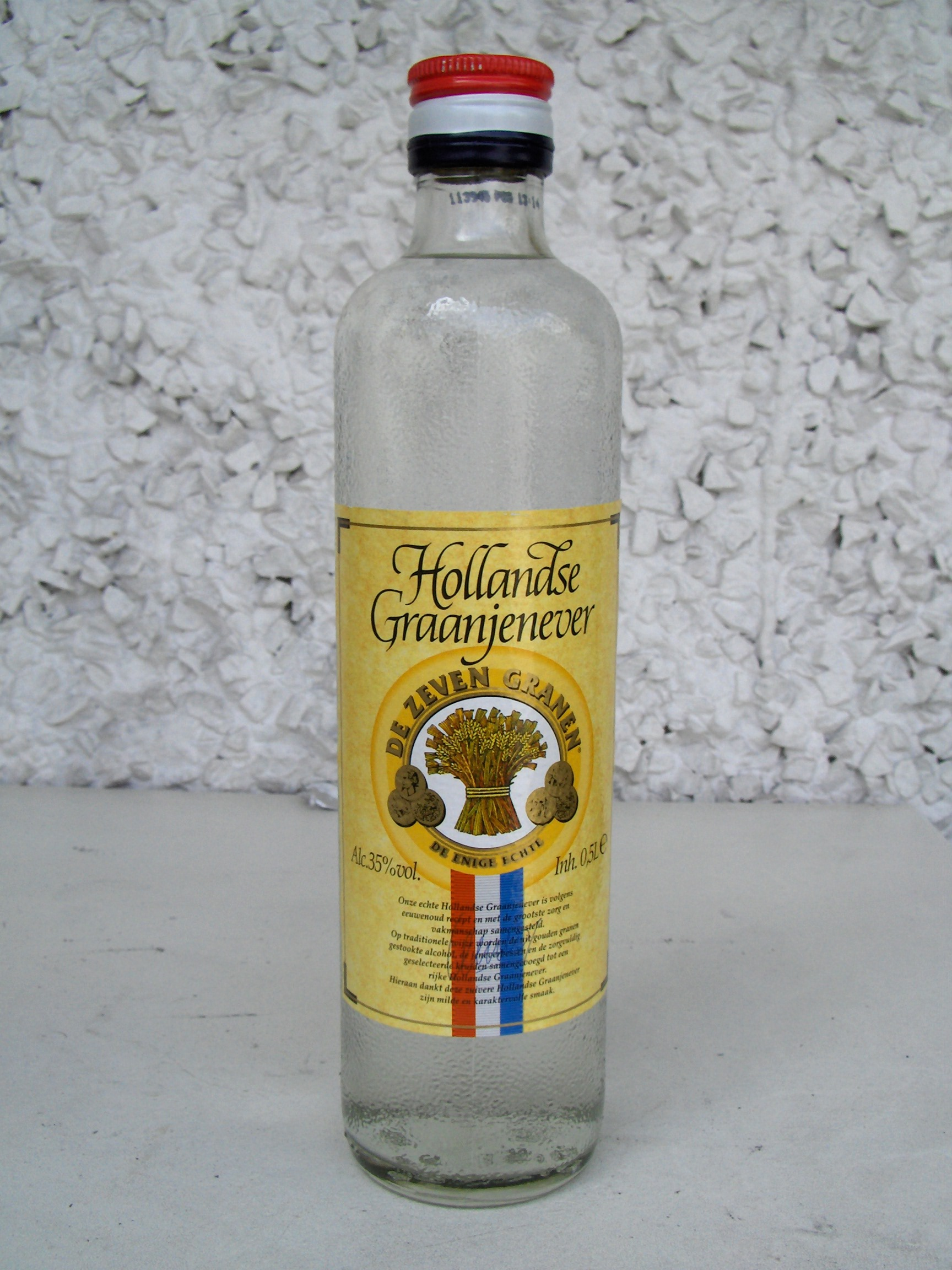
Hollandse Graanjenever

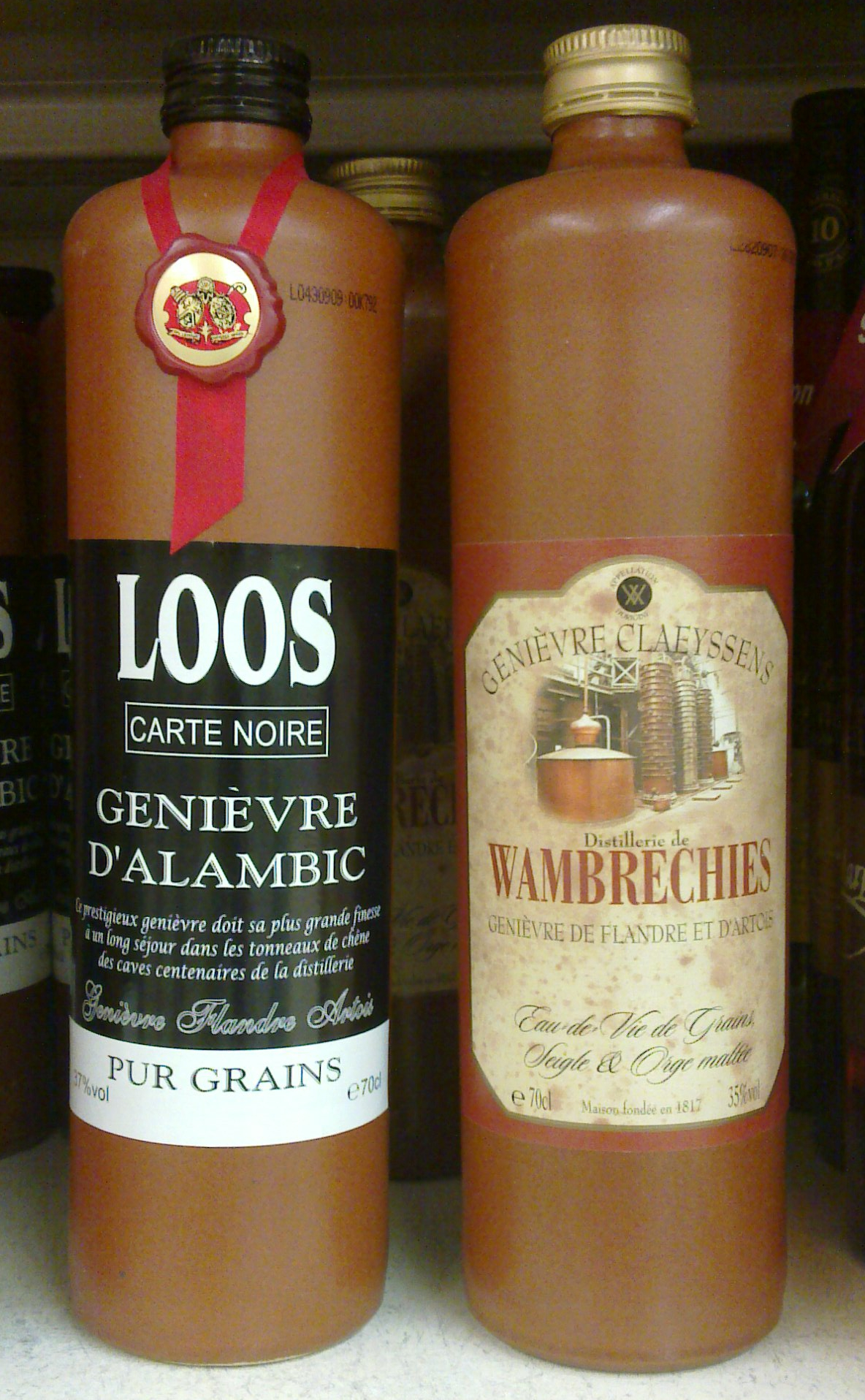
French genièvre

Jenever (English: /dʒəˈniːvər/, Dutch: [jəˈneːvər]), also known as Hollands, genever, genièvre, pekèt, or sometimes as Dutch gin (archaic: Holland gin or Geneva gin), is the juniper-flavoured traditional liquor in the Netherlands, Belgium, and adjoining areas in northern France and northwestern Germany. As an EU and UK protected designation of origin, the term jenever and its soundalikes can only be used if the product is made according to the specifications in Belgium, the Netherlands, and small regions of France and Germany. Modern gin was derived from historical jenevers after they were introduced to Great Britain.

== History ==
Jenever was originally produced by distilling malt wine (moutwijn in Dutch) to 50% alcohol by volume. Because the resulting spirit was not palatable due to the lack of refined distilling techniques (with only the pot still available), herbs were added to mask the flavour. The juniper berry (which comes from the Latin juniperus), hence the name jenever (and the English name gin), was used for its alleged medicinal benefits.

At least in some regions, such as around Ommen in Overijssel, Netherlands, jenever is distilled from spelt, an old variety of wheat.

The first written references to genever (or jenever) appear in scientific papers by several Flemish authors. Jacob van Maerlant (Bruges, 1235 – 1300) described how to add parts of the juniper tree to a spirit made by distilling wine in his book Der Naturen Bloeme, published in 1266. It was the first Dutch writing on distilling and concerned the juniper tree. Later on, in 1522, the Antwerp-based doctor Phillipus Hermanni wrote the first recipe for genever. He described mixing crushed juniper berries with wine and then distilling it. The earliest versions of genever were made for medical purposes and were distilled from wine. Later, when cold periods drove out the vineyards in Flanders, it was replaced by distilling beer, called malt wine.

There is a tradition that attributes the invention of jenever to the Dutch chemist and alchemist Franciscus Sylvius de Bouve (1614–1672). However, the evidence suggests that jenever was already known and used as a medicine in the 1500s. Already by 1606 (several years before Sylvius's birth), the Dutch had levied taxes on jenever and similar liquors as alcoholic drinks, suggesting that jenever had by then stopped being considered a medicinal remedy. Furthermore, prior to Sylvius's tenth birthday, jenever appeared in Philip Massinger's 1623 play, The Duke of Milan, which referred to the drink as "geneva". Geneva was the Anglicized name for jenever (even though the drink has no relation to the Swiss city of Geneva), a name that English soldiers had brought back with them when returning from battle in the Low Countries, first in 1587 (well before Sylvius's birth) and again during the early 1600s.

Since the 1950s, Dutch flag carrier airline KLM has issued a series of Delft Blue houses modelled on buildings in the Netherlands filled with jenever, which are presented to passengers.

== Old and young ==
There are two types of jenever: oude (old) and jonge (young). This is not a matter of aging, but of distilling techniques. Around 1900, it became possible to distill a high-grade alcohol that was almost neutral in taste, regardless of the spirit's origin. A worldwide tendency toward a lighter, less dominant taste, along with lower prices, led to the development of blended whisky in Scotland and, in the Netherlands, to Jonge Jenever. During World War I, the lack of imported cereals — and hence malt — forced the promotion of this blend. Alcohol derived from molasses from the sugar beet industry was used as an alternative to grain spirit. People started using the terms oude for the old-style jenever and jonge for the new style, which contains more grain instead of malt and can even contain plain sugar-based alcohol.

In modern times, jenever distilled from grain and malt only is labelled Graanjenever. Jonge jenever can contain no more than 15% malt wine and 10 grams of sugar per litre. Oude jenever must contain at least 15% malt wine but no more than 20 g of sugar per litre. Korenwijn (grain wine) is a drink similar to 18th-century-style jenever and is often matured for a few years in an oak cask; it contains 51% to 70% malt wine and up to 20 g/L of sugar. Although the name oude jenever does not necessarily mean the jenever is actually old, some distilleries age their jenever in oak barrels.

About 90% of all Jonge Jenever sold on the market is a blend of malt wine produced by Filliers in Belgium, sugar beet- or grain-based ethyl alcohol from factories in Germany, France, and (mostly) Russia, and water. Most major brands contain no malt wine, so they resemble vodka. Distilleries in Belgium and the Netherlands actually distill jenever, which mostly produces limited volumes of specialty drinks.

As of 2021, an estimated 98% of genever sold was jonge.

== Taste ==
Jonge jenever has a neutral taste, like vodka, with a slight aroma of juniper and malt wine. Oude jenever has a smoother, very aromatic taste with malty flavours. Oude jenever is sometimes aged in wood; its malty, woody, and smoky flavours resemble whisky. Different grains used in the production process—such as barley, wheat, spelt, and rye—produce jenevers with different flavours. The taste is sometimes enhanced by using barrels previously used for American whiskey.

== Jenever cities ==
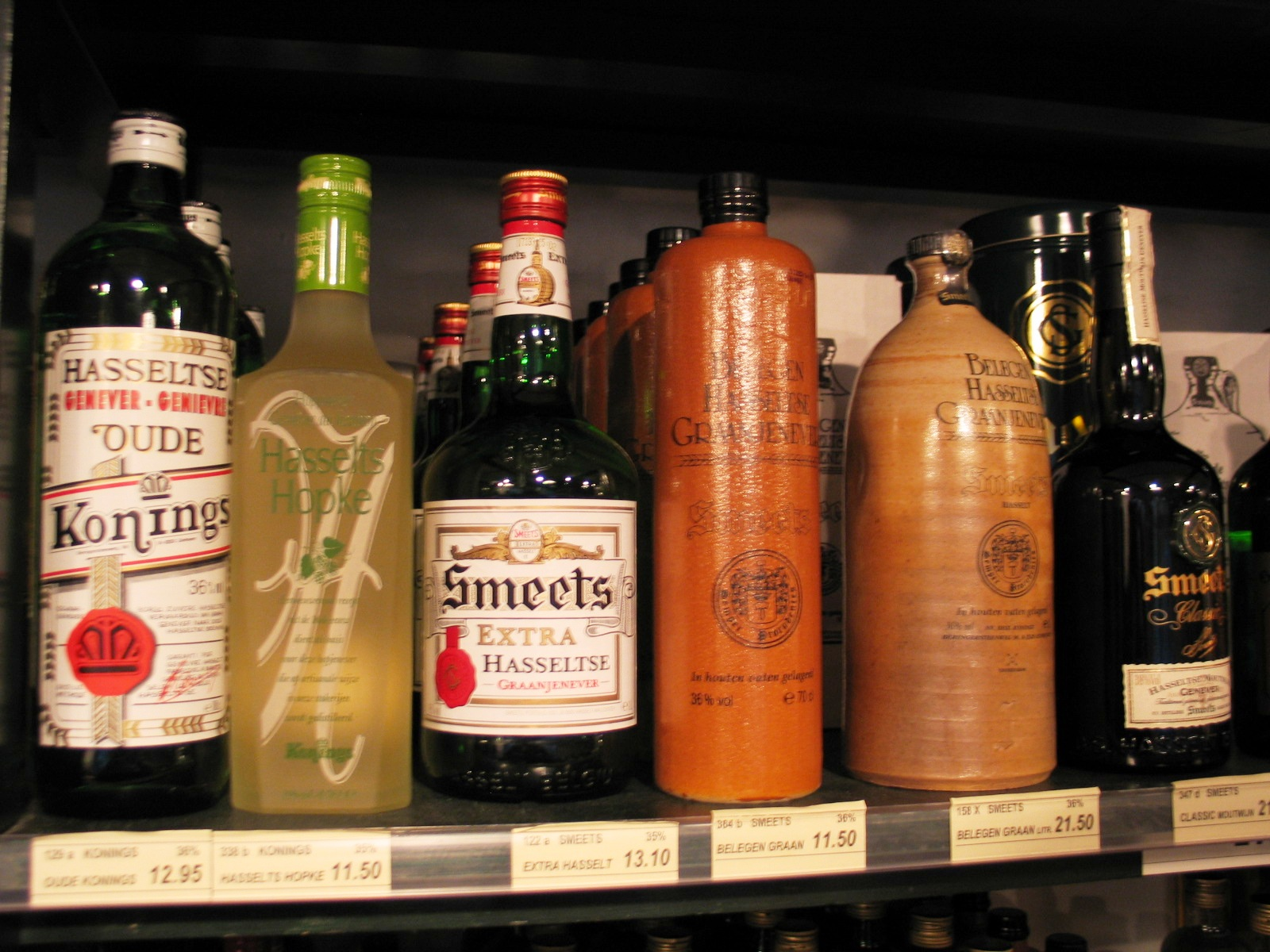
Bottles of jenever for sale in Hasselt, including two in traditional clay bottles

Hasselt, Deinze, Aalst, and Liège in Belgium, and Schiedam, Groningen, Amsterdam, and Delft in the Netherlands, are well known for their jenevers and often referred to as "jenever cities" (jeneversteden). In Amsterdam, jenever is made by The Stillery, Van Wees, and Wynand Fockink. Well-known Schiedam jenever distilleries include Nolet, Onder De Boompjes, Herman Jansen, and De Kuyper. (Jenever can appear under the English-language name "schiedam".) Near the Dutch-Belgian border, in Baarle-Nassau, Zuidam produces traditional jenevers and Dutch liquors. Other jenever cities in the Netherlands are Groningen (Hooghoudt) and Dordrecht (Rutte Distillery). In Belgium, Deinze is very well known for the Filliers distillery, and Aalst is well known for Stokerij De Moor and Stokerij Van Der Schueren, both still active today. Hasselt styles itself as Belgium's jenever capital and has a museum dedicated to the drink. It is also home to the Biercée Distillery in Wallonia, one of only two Belgian distilleries to export their genever to the USA.

Dutch-based Lucas Bols produces and sells oude genever, known as ginebra in Spanish, in South America. Ketel One is now more known for producing vodka, but it started out as, and still is, a jenever distillery.

== Drinking traditions ==
Traditionally, the drink is served in a tulip-shaped glass filled to the brim, with surface tension allowing the jenever to rise above the glass's edge. Jonge jenever, colloquially a jonkie ("young'un"), is usually served at room temperature, sometimes (though this is now quite old-fashioned) with some sugar and a tiny spoon to stir. The drink is sometimes served cold from a bottle kept in a freezer or on the rocks (jonge met ijs). The higher-quality oude jenever (and korenwijn) is usually served at room temperature. When jenever is drunk alongside beer (normally lager) as a chaser, it is referred to as a kopstoot (headbutt); when the glass of jenever is dipped into the beer glass, it is called a duikboot (submarine) in Flanders and the South of Holland. Traditionally, jenever is served in full shot-glasses taken directly from the freezer. Because the glass is so full, it is advisable to take the first sip without holding the glass, leaving it on the table and bending one's back to bring the glass to one's mouth. In the Netherlands, this method of drinking is known as the "kopstootje" or "little head-butt".

== Geographical indications ==
Recognized for its historic and cultural contribution, and subject to production specifications, the European Union protected genever with 11 specific types of jenever as a geographical indication:

- Belgium, the Netherlands, small parts of France, and small parts of Germany: genever (Genièvre / Jenever / Genever), grain genever (Genièvre de grains / Graanjenever / Graangenever)
- Belgium, the Netherlands, small parts of Germany: Genièvre aux fruits / Vruchtenjenever / Jenever met vruchten / Fruchtgenever
- Belgium and the Netherlands: old genever (oude jenever / oude genever), young genever (jonge jenever / jonge genever)
- Belgium: O'de Flander real East-Flemish grain genever (O'de Flander Echte Oost-Vlaamse graanjenever), Hasselt genever (Hasseltse jenever), Balegem genever (Balegemse jenever), and the Walloon peket (Peket-Pekêt / Pèket-Pèkèt de Wallonie)
- Two provinces of France: Flanders Artois genever (genièvre Flandre Artois)
- Two states of Germany: East-Frisia cereal grain genever (Ostfriesischer Korngenever)

The names Genièvre and Genièvre de Jura are also protected geographical indications of Switzerland (recognised in the EU).

Protection as a geographical indication of Jenever also applies in Armenia, China, Georgia, Iceland, Kosovo, Liechtenstein, Mexico, Moldova, Norway, Switzerland, Ukraine, the United Kingdom and Japan.

== See also ==
- Dumont Frères & Cie
