= Ligny (river) =

River in Belgium

Location
- Country: Belgium

Physical characteristics
- Source
  - location: Wagnelée
- Mouth
  - location: Mazy at a place called Falnuée
  - coordinates: 50°30′17″N 4°40′11″E

Basin features
- Progression: Orneau → Sambre → Meuse → North Sea
- River system: Meuse

The Ligny is a stream in Belgium, a tributary of the Orneau on the right bank. Its waters eventually join the Meuse via the Sambre and therefore part of the Meuse basin.

== Course ==
The river starts on the border between Hainaut and Brabant at Chassart. It passes through Wagnelée, crosses Saint-Amand-lez-Fleurus, towards Ligny, then it flows towards Sombreffe and then passes through the villages of Tongrinne, Boignée, Balâtre and Saint-Martin. It joins the Orneau (a tributary of the Sambre) at Mazy at Falnuée.

At the source, the valley is bordered by gently sloping hills. From Boignée, the valley is more steep, with rocky outcrops appearing, the most important being located at Rue des Bancs, in Balâtre. In its lower part, the Ligne valley is marked by karst phenomena.

The Line has long experienced seasonal flooding. But in the early 1970s, work to dig the river bed limited flooding to the point where it became extremely rare.

== Tributaries ==
Its tributaries are:

- the Martinroux from the Vieux Campinaire de Fleurus and joins at Saint-Amand
- the Plomcot or Ri d'Amour from Fleurus-Fontenelle (current Fleurus-Farciennes industrial estate) which serves as a boundary between Fleurus, Saint-Amand and Ligny
- the Ri de Grand Vau on the right bank at Balâtre, just upstream from the millrace of the old mill
- the Ri de Saint-Pierre on the left bank at the exit of Saint-Martin, at the place called Villeret

== Heritage ==
Along its route, the river passes close to several remarkable sites:

- the Roman road Bavay-Cologne (Brunehaut road)
- the old Chassart factory
- the Wagnelée farms and the castles of the Dumont de Chassart family
- the farms of Saint-Amand, its castles and its old breweries
- the site of Napoleon's last victory on June 16, 1815
- the lower and upper farm of Ligny, as well as the old mill bridge.
- the Ligny quarry, current water reserve for Brussels
- Sombreffe Castle
- the Balâtre castle-farm
- the old Balâtre mill
- the dungeon of Villeret
- Villeret farm
- the Falnuée farm at its confluence with the Orneau

== Environment ==
The Ligne, where elders came to collect bloodworms for fishing, was for a long time a very polluted watercourse, especially after 1980, in particular because of the sewers that discharged their polluted water directly into it and the Ri de Grand Vau, coming from Wanfercée-Baulet, a treatment plant in operation since 2008. At the beginning of the 2000s, efforts were made to improve the situation. A treatment plant installed at the exit of Saint-Martin must collect all the wastewater from the valley, thus avoiding direct discharge into the stream.
