= Tongrenelle =

- Hamlet
- Location within Belgium
- Coordinates: 50°30′41.27″N 4°36′45.98″E
- Country: Belgium
- Region: Wallonia
- Province: Namur
- Municipality: Sombreffe
- Time zone: UTC+1 (CET)

Tongrenelle (French pronunciation: [tɔ̃ɡʁənɛl]) is a hamlet of Wallonia in the municipality of Sombreffe, district of Tongrinne, located in the province of Namur), Belgium.

It is east of the village of Ligny and north of the village of Boignée and on the south-eastern side of the village of Tongrinne.

Within the hamlet is the Ferme-Château de Tongrenelle. A castle existed on the site which entered the historical record in 1209. During the Battle of Ligny 16 June 1815 the castle, a formidable redoubt, was garrisoned by a contingent from the 3rd Battalion of the Prussian 27th Regiment. during the first half of the 19th century the castle fell into disrepair and was demolished in 1860. What remains is now a moated manor house with buildings dating from the 17th and 18th centuries. (Note: The moat fed by the Ligny)
