= 15th Infantry Division (France) =

15th Infantry Division 15th Motorized Infantry Division (1940)
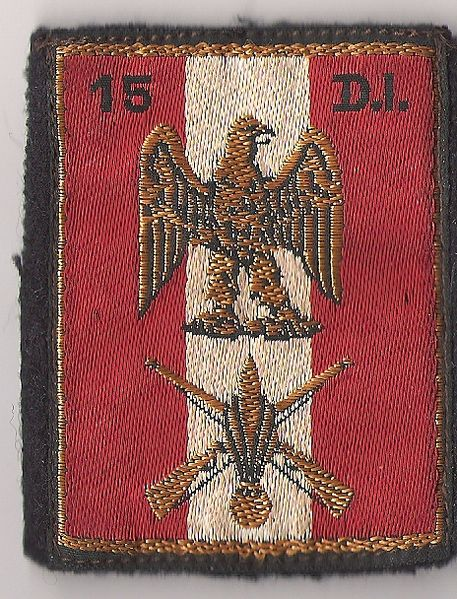
- Division insignia 1977–1994
- Active: 1875–1940; 1951–1962; 1977–1994
- Country: France
- Branch: French Army
- Type: Infantry, later Motorized infantry
- Garrison/HQ: Dijon (1875–1940); Limoges (1977–1994)
- Engagements: World War I; World War II

Commanders
- Notable commanders: Alphonse Juin

The 15th Infantry Division (French: 15^{e} division d'infanterie (15^{e} DI)) was an infantry division of the French Army originally formed after the end of the Franco-Prussian War that fought in World War I. It fought in World War II as the 15th Motorized Infantry Division, under the command of Alphonse Juin, surrendering during the Battle of France.

Reestablished on 1 March 1951, it was disbanded in 1962. The division was reformed again during the French Army reorganization of 1977. In the 1980s it was part of the 2nd Army Corps; it was shifted into the 3rd Army Corps after the 2nd Army Corps was disestablished, and finally disbanded in 1994.

== First World War ==
It was commanded by General Léon Bajolle upon mobilization. General Gaston d'Armau de Pouydraguin became commander on 14 October 1914. General Ferdinand Blazer was appointed commander on 24 March 1915, General François Collas on 15 July of that year, and General Louis Achille Arbanere on 9 March 1917.

The division was assigned to the 8th Army Corps for the duration of the war. It included the 29th Brigade with the 56th and 134th Infantry Regiments and the 30th Brigade with the 10th and 27th Infantry Regiments. Organic artillery support was provided by the 48th Field Artillery Regiment with three groupes of 75mm guns, while reconnaissance was provided by a cavalry squadron of the 16th Chasseur Regiment; in November 1915 it transferred to the 73rd Infantry Division. In January 1917, the 27th Regiment was transferred to the 16th Infantry Division. At the same time the division was reorganized to form a triangular structure, eliminating the brigade headquarters to include the 10th, 56th, and 134th Infantry Regiments, and was again assigned two squadrons from the 16th Chasseurs. In August 1918, the pioneer battalion of the 106th Reserve Infantry Regiment was attached to the division after being transferred from the 20th Army Corps.

== Interwar period ==
The 15th Motorized Infantry Division, a unit of the Northeast type, was stationed at Dijon during the interwar period. It included the 4th, 27th, and 134th Infantry Regiments, the 4th Infantry Division Reconnaissance Group with armored cars (French: 4^{e} Groupe de reconnaissance de division d'infanterie (4^{e} GRDI)), the 1st Motorized Divisional Artillery Regiment, the 201st Motorized Divisional Light Artillery Regiment with two groups of 155mm howitzers, in addition to smaller support units.

== Second World War ==
=== Mobilization and Phoney War ===
On 23 August 1939, when the French Army began its mobilization for World War II, the division was at the disposal of the Minister of Defense and its first echelon was alerted in the 8th Military Region. Under the mobilization plan it was located in the area of Gray, under the command of Général de division Henri Parisot from 2 September. The second echelon arrived on 26 August, when the division was assigned to the covering reserve in the 8th Army sector. On 5 September it was transferred by road to the area southwest of Sarrebourg, with headquarters in Blamont as part of the 5th Army. Three days later the division headquarters relocated east to Lemberg when it became part of the 8th Army Corps of the 5th Army.

Between 9 and 12 September the division advanced into the Ohrenthal (part of Rolbing) salient with the 23rd Infantry Division of the 5th Army Corps of the 4th Army on the left and the 4th Colonial Infantry Division of its corps on the right in front of the Maginot Line as part of the Saar Offensive, with its headquarters at Schorbach. This advance, which became known as the Saar Offensive, resulted in the division occupying positions from the German border at Hornbach to the outskirts of Stausteinerwald, west of the Fortified Sector of Rohrbach, on 13 September. As the French units began retreating towards the Maginot Line, the division sector was modified to run from Height 326 west of Hornbach to Height 354 west of Riedelberg between 24 and 25 September.

Relieved by the 35th Infantry Division in its left sector and the 3rd Colonial Infantry Division in its right sector between 2 and 3 October, the division retreated behind the Maginot Line. It reconcentrated in the area of Baerenthal on 4 October. Transferred to the 5th Army reserve with headquarters at Bouxwiller on 9 October, the 15^{e} DIM moved by road to the area of Sarrebourg and Cirey on the next day, where it became part of the reserve of the 2nd Army Group with headquarters at the latter. It was further moved by rail and road to the area of Chauny, Guiscard, Ham, and Coucy for rest, reorganization, and training on 23 October. There, it was placed in the reserve of the Grand Quartier Général while headquartered at Chauny, where it spent the rest of the Phoney War. Général de division Alphonse Juin became division commander on 1 December.

=== Battle of Belgium ===
When the German invasion of Belgium began on 10 May 1940, the division was alerted for movement into Belgium under the Dyle Plan. Assigned to the 4th Army Corps of the 1st Army, the 15^{e} DIM recalled the 27th Infantry Regiment, which was at Sissonne on maneuvers. The 134th Infantry Regiment was sent ahead to Saint-Quentin, while the 4^{e} GRDI was detached to the corps headquarters as part of Groupement Arlabosse, led by its commander. On the next day the division moved by road from Chauny to Gembloux through Tergnier, Saint-Quentin, Le Cateau, Binche, La Louvière, Gosselies, and Tongrinne, setting up its headquarters at Tongrinne. The 4th and 134th Infantry Regiments began moving into positions on 12 May, with a battalion from each regiment occupying the sector of the 1st Moroccan Division, which had not yet arrived, from Ernage to the northern part of Gembloux. Groupement Arlabosse was briefly transferred back to the division that day but again detached to the 1st Moroccan Division at noon.

The 27th Infantry Regiment arrived at the division positions on 13 May and at the end of that day the division was relieved by the newly arrived 1st Moroccan Division. Its positions shifted to a sector between the 1st Moroccan Division on the southern edge of Gembloux and the 12th Motorized Infantry Division at Beuzet; the 134th Infantry held the northernmost part of the line, the 27th Infantry the middle, and the 4th Infantry the southernmost. At noon on the same day the 4^{e} GRDI was placed under direct corps command between Geest and Noville to the north of Grande-Rosiére.

The division engaged German forces along its front on 14 May, while being forced to retreat in what became known as the Battle of Gembloux. Its artillery targeted German tank concentrations in the area of Grandleez and Baudeset in support of the 1st Moroccan Division. German tank attacks were repulsed by the 27th Infantry Regiment to the south of Gembloux and the 4th Infantry Regiment at Beuzet on 15 May. On that day the 13^{e} Battalion de Chars de Combat with Hotchkiss H35 light tanks of 515^{e} Groupe de battalions de Chars de Combat was attached to the division, while the 1st Battalion of the 27th Infantry Regiment was detached to Groupement Bougrain. During the night it retreated under orders by rail to Wavre and Charleroi. The division headquarters shifted to Thiméon on 16 May, when it held defensive positions on the line of Brye, Saint-Amand, and Fleurus. The 4th and 27th Infantry Regiments repulsed German tank attacks, and retreated under orders covered by the 134th Infantry Regiment to a bridgehead at Luttre on the Charleroi Canal from Seneffe to Godarville where it relieved elements of the corps.

Juin was captured with much of the division at Lille on 29 May 1940.

== Cold War ==
The 15th Infantry Division was reestablished on 1 March 1951, and disbanded on 1 July 1962.

The division was again reestablished during the 1977 reorganization of the French Army, with its headquarters at Limoges as part of the Strategic Reserve. In event of war, elements of it would be used as cadres for the reserve 115th Infantry Division. Under the 1983 reorganization of the French Army, the division was assigned to the 2nd Army Corps. It included the 92nd Infantry Regiment (92e RI); equipped with VAB armoured personnel carriers) at Clermont-Ferrand and the 99th Infantry Regiment (VAB) at Salhonay, both formerly part of the 14th Infantry Division, and the 126th Infantry Regiment (VAB) at Brive-la-Gaillarde. The AML-equipped 5e Regiment de Chasseurs at Périgueux provided reconnaissance capability, the 20th Artillery Regiment (155mm towed) at Poitiers artillery, the 65e compaigne de genie at Castelsarrasin engineers, and the 15 RCS at Limoges support.

Before its disbandment the division became part of the 3rd Army Corps.

Général de brigade M. Zeisser (Michel, Maurice) was named commander of the division and of the 43e division militaire territoriale in 1991.

As of a decree of 6 July 1992, M. le général de division Genest (Claude, Jean, Maclou) was naméd commander of the division and of the circonscription militaire de défense de Limoges as of 1 September 1992.

As part of the reduction in the strength of the French Army during the 1990s after the end of the Cold War, the division was disbanded in a process concluding in 1994. Elements of the division were merged into the 27th Alpine Division to form the 27th Mountain Infantry Division on 1 July of that year. The division headquarters, the 15^{e} RCS, and the 5th Chasseur Regiment were disbanded, while the Véhicule de l'Avant Blindé-equipped 92nd Infantry Regiment joined the 27th Mountain Infantry Division.
