= List of windmills in Namur (province) =

A list of windmills in the Belgian province of Namur.

Location	Name of mill	Type	Built	Notes	Photograph
Andenne	Molen de Stud	Grondzeiler	18th century	Molenechos (in Dutch)	
Belgrade	Moulin Massinon	Grondzeiler	1828	Molenechos (in Dutch)	
Frasnes-lez-Couvin	Moulin Tromcourt; Moulin de Géronsart	Grondzeiler	Early 19th century	Molenechos (in Dutch)	
Gembloux-sur-Orneau	Moulin Staquet; Moulin Créton	Grondzeiler	19th century	Molenechos (in Dutch)	
Grand-Leez	Moulin Defrenne	Grondzeiler	1830	Molenechos (in Dutch)	
Grand Leez	Moulin Lorge	Grondzeiler	19th century	Molenechos (in Dutch)	
Ligny		Staakmolen			
Mettet	Moulin de Scry; Vieux Moulin	Grondzeiler	1792	Molenechos (in Dutch)	
Sauvenière	Moulin Michaux	Grondzeiler	1802	Molenechos (in Dutch)	
Tongrinne	Moulin de Tongrinne	Grondzeiler	19th century	Molenechos (in Dutch)	
Velaine-sur-Sambre	Moulin des Golettes	Grondzeiler	Late 18th century	Molenechos (in Dutch)	

== Notes ==
Bold indicates a mill that is still standing. Italics indicates a mill with some remains surviving.
