= 1st Artillery Regiment (France) =

Régiment de La Fère 1ére Régiment d'Artillerie à Pied 1ére Régiment d'Artillerie
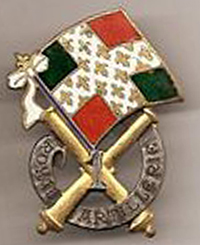
- Insignia of the 1st Artillery Regiment
- Active: 1671–Present
- Country: France
- Branch: French Army
- Type: Artillery
- Part of: 1st Division
- Garrison/HQ: Belfort
- Motto(s): Royal d'abord premier toujours
- Conflicts: War of the Austrian Succession; Seven Years' War; War of the First Coalition; War of the Second Coalition; Egyptian Campaign; War of the Third Coalition; War of the Fourth Coalition; Peninsular War; Invasion of Russia; War of the Sixth Coalition; Siege of Antwerp; Crimean War; Sino-French War; World War I; World War II; Algerian War; Cold War
- Decorations: Croix de guerre 1914-1918 with two palms

Commanders
- Current commander: LtCol Raphaël Bernard

The 1st Artillery Regiment is a regiment of artillery in the French Army tracing its modern history to 1791 when the Régiment de La Fére was re-organised into the 1st Artillery Regiment after the French Revolution.

== History ==
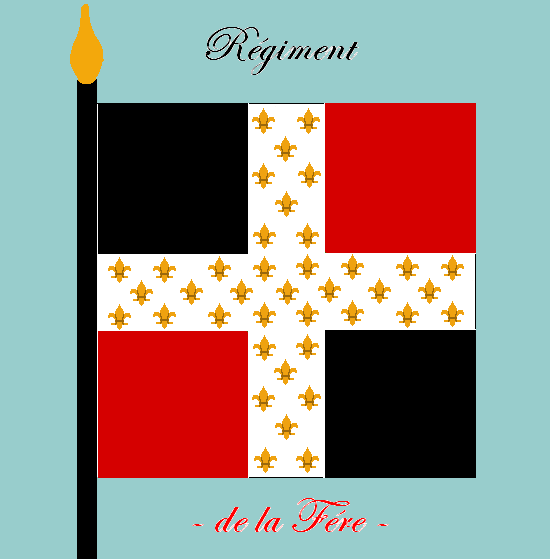
Colours of the Régiment de La Fère

It was raised as the Régiment de la Fère in 1765, from the 1st battalion of the Régiment Royal-Artillerie. In 1791, after the French Revolution, it had the title of its aristocratic patron removed and was given the number 1, as the senior most French regiment of artillery. In 1785, Napoleon Bonaparte was commissioned into this regiment at the rank of second lieutenant. He officially served until 1790, but he spent most of that time on leave in Corsica, where he led a battalion of Republican volunteers.

=== Between the wars ===
The regiment was assigned to the 15th Infantry Division and was stationed notably in Auxonne and Dijon, under the name 1er Régiment d'Artillery Divisionnaire (1st Divisional Artillery Regiment).

=== World War II ===
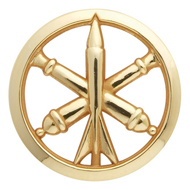
Artillery badge.

Attached to the First Army and the 4th Army Corps.

Composed of a battery hors-rang, three groups of 75 and a Divisional Anti-Tank Battery (BDAC) of 75mm or 47mm.

The regiment was doubled and created the 1st Divisional Heavy Artillery Regiment (RALD), equipped with 105C and 155C.

== Current organisation ==
The current organisation of the regiment is:

- Command and Logistics Battery
- 1ére Batterie (MLRS M270 and 120 mm mortars)
- 2éme Batterie (MLRS M270 and 120 mm mortars)
- 3éme Batterie (MLRS M270 and 120 mm mortars)
- 4éme Batterie (COBRA counter-battery radars, SL2A acoustic artillery location systems, and GA10 ground alert and impact zone early warning systems)
- 5éme Batterie (COBRA counter-battery radars, SL2A acoustic artillery location systems, and GA10 ground alert and impact zone early warning systems)
- 6éme Batterie (Reserve)
- Maintenance Battery
