= Proost (company) =

Proost International Book Production was a Belgian manufacturer and supplier for the book publishing industry. It was one of the companies of the printing valley around Turnhout, Belgium. The company operated from two manufacturing sites in Belgium, one in Turnhout (Flanders) and one in Fleurus (Wallonia).

== History ==
The company was founded in 1913 by Henri Proost, who previously worked at Brepols as director of the churchbook division. He founded his company in the Otterstraat in Turnhout and specialized in printing and binding of bibles and missals. The company continued this way until the Second Vatican Council, which causes a large decline of the need for church books. In 1962 the company changed from monochrome to color printing and diversified its business beyond religious books. In 1976 Proost built a new plant on an industrial estate near Turnhout, because it had outgrown its old plant in the centre of the city. At the same time the first four-color CMYK web-press was installed, which could print on continuous rolls of paper. In 1990 the company continued to expand and acquire a second printing plant in Fleurus, and became one of the biggest manufacturers in the world of books for children, comics, educational books and illustrated books. After being a family-owned business for about 83 years the company was acquired by LIBERfabrica plc (United Kingdom) in 1996, which in turn was acquired by Chevrillon Philippe Industrie (CPI) of France in 1999. The entire group operated in five countries and employed about 3400 people. Proost returned to Belgian hands in June 2009 following a takeover by the investment group Axxess Partners. In 2012 the company filed for bankruptcy, but was able to make a new start. Despite a continuing poor economic climate, Proost took over the Slovak company Qatena in 2013 and hoped to strengthen its chances of survival in the print sector. However, it did not help and Proost closed its doors definitively in 2015.

== See also ==
- Flemish Innovation Center for Graphic Communication

== Sources ==
- De Turnhoutse Kempen, haar economische en sociale betekenis, Vlaams Economisch Verbond, pp. 88–90
