= Boignée =

Village in Namur Province, Belgium

Boignée Bwagnéye (Walloon)
- Village
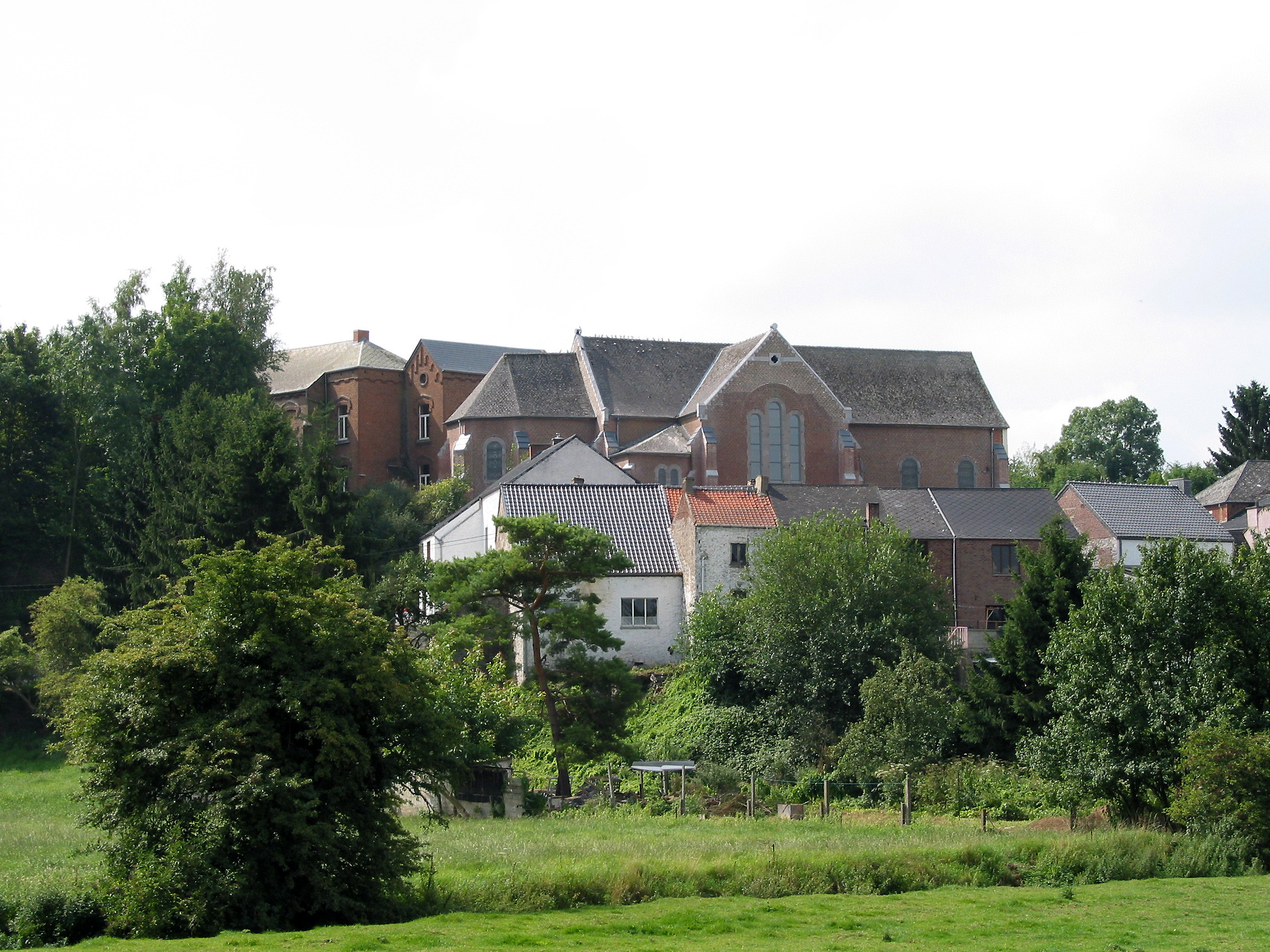
- The church neighbourhood

- Location within Belgium
- Coordinates: 50°31′26.78″N 4°33′23.96″E
- Country: Belgium
- Region: Wallonia
- Province: Namur
- Municipality: Sombreffe
- Time zone: UTC+1 (CET)

Boignée (French pronunciation: [bwaɲe]; Walloon: Bwagnéye) is a village of Wallonia and a district of the municipality of Sombreffe, located in the province of Namur, Belgium.

Previously its own municipality, a 1977 fusion of the Belgian municipalities made it an ancienne commune of Sombreffe. Boignée is on the banks of the river Ligny.

== History ==
The village of Boignée was a location taken up and defended by the Prussian army during the Battle of Ligny on 16 June 1815.
