= List of protected heritage sites in Sombreffe =

This table shows an overview of the protected heritage sites in the Walloon town Sombreffe. This list is part of Belgium's national heritage.

| Object | Year/architect | Town/section | Address | Coordinates | Number^{?} | Image |
|---|---|---|---|---|---|---|
| Old Sombreffe Castle ^{(nl)} ^{(fr)} | | Sombreffe | | 50.531040°N 4.596292°E | 92114-CLT-0001-01 Info | Oude kasteelhoeve van Sombreffe |
| The neighboring areas of castle Sombreffe ^{(nl)} ^{(fr)} | | Sombreffe | | 50.530137°N 4.593983°E | 92114-CLT-0003-01 Info | |
| Notre Dame Walcourt and the ensemble of the chapel and two lime trees around it ^{(nl)} ^{(fr)} | | Sombreffe | Sombreffe | 50.527466°N 4.593311°E | 92114-CLT-0004-01 Info | |
| Old marker at the site of "Le Point du Jour" ^{(nl)} ^{(fr)} | | Sombreffe | Sombreffe | 50.522482°N 4.637909°E | 92114-CLT-0005-01 Info | |
| Farm "Ferme d'en Haut" and the ensemble of the farm and the surrounding area ^{(nl)} ^{(fr)} | | Sombreffe | Ligny | 50.511393°N 4.575811°E | 92114-CLT-0006-01 Info | |
| The facades and roofs of the old farm Frennet ^{(nl)} ^{(fr)} | | Sombreffe | Sombreffe | 50.514169°N 4.580030°E | 92114-CLT-0007-01 Info | |
| Church of Notre Dame and the walls of the cemetery and the ensemble of the church, cemetery with poplar and acacia trees located along the route Boignée ^{(nl)} ^{(fr)} | | Sombreffe | Tongrinne | 50.513433°N 4.622923°E | 92114-CLT-0009-01 Info | |
| The house, porch, outbuildings and walls of the rectory and the ensemble of the land, buildings, road paving, the path along the back of the garden ^{(nl)} ^{(fr)} | | Sombreffe | Tongrine | 50.515413°N 4.623247°E | 92114-CLT-0010-01 Info | |
| The parts of the medieval Sombreffe Castle ^{(nl)} ^{(fr)} | | Sombreffe | | 50.531040°N 4.596292°E | 92114-PEX-0001-01 Info | De middeleeuwse delen van de kasteelhoeve van Sombreffe |

== See also ==
- List of protected heritage sites in Namur (province)
