= Lambusart =

Village in Wallonia

Coordinates: 50°27′N 4°33′E

Lambusart (Walloon: Lambussåt) is a village of Wallonia and a district of the municipality of Fleurus located in the province of Hainaut, Belgium.
