= Wangenies =

Wangenies Wandjniye (Walloon)
- Location within Belgium
- Coordinates: 50°28′N 4°31′E
- Country: Belgium
- Region: Wallonia
- Province: Hainaut
- Municipality: Fleurus
- Demonym: Wangenicéen(ne)
- Postal code: 6220

Wangenies (Walloon: Wandjniye) is a village of Wallonia, and a district of the municipality of Fleurus, located in the province of Hainaut, Belgium.

It was its own municipality prior to the fusion of municipalities of 1977.
