= Heppignies =

Coordinates: 50.48423°N 4.49308°E

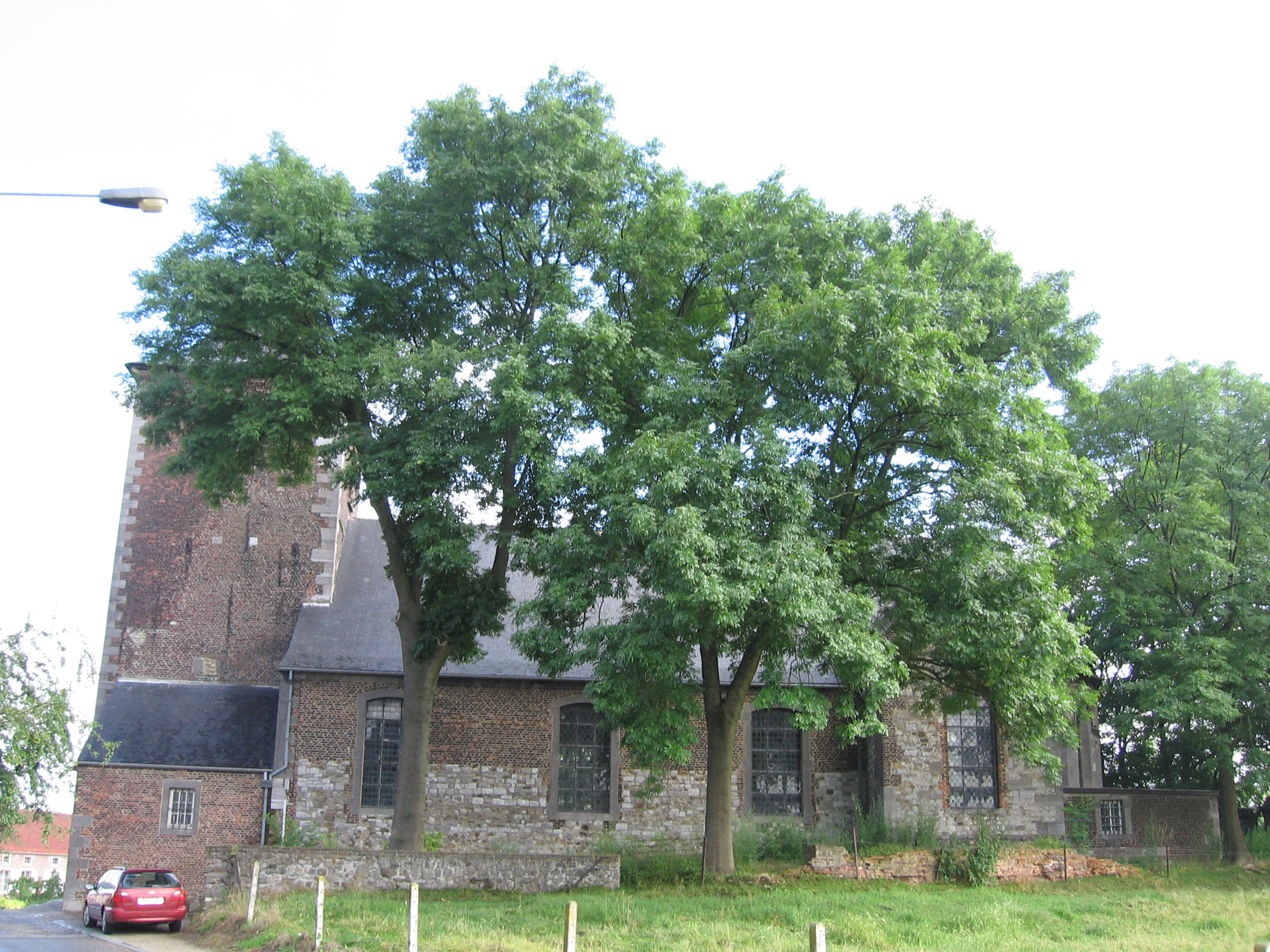
Church of Saint-Barthélemy in Heppignies

Heppignies (French pronunciation: [ɛpiɲi]; Walloon: Epniye) is a village of Wallonia and a district of the municipality of Fleurus located in the province of Hainaut, Belgium.

It is also the name of an industrial estate in the northern district of the Walloon city of Fleurus, which is to the south of the old village centre and next to the junction of the R3 A15 main roads.
