= Sombreffe Castle =

Castle in Wallonia, Belgium

- Sombreffe, Wallonia, Belgium
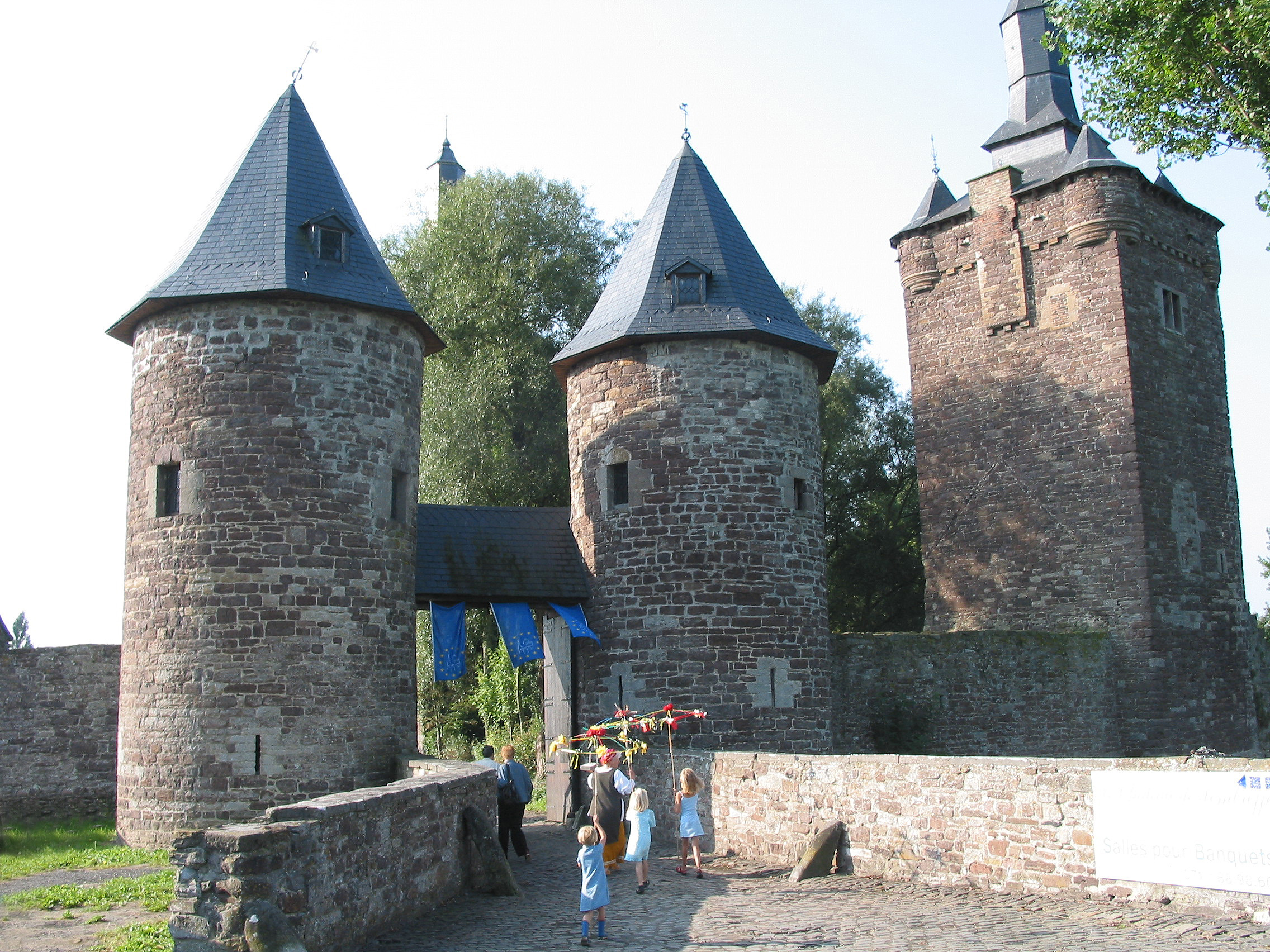

Site information
- Type: Castle

Location
- Coordinates: 50.530°N 4.596°E

Sombreffe Castle (French: Château de Sombreffe) is a medieval castle in Sombreffe, province of Namur, Wallonia, Belgium.

== See also ==
- List of castles in Belgium
- List of protected heritage sites in Sombreffe
