= Battle of Ligny =

1815 battle during the War of the Seventh Coalition (Hundred Days)

- Part of the Waterloo campaign during the War of the Seventh Coalition
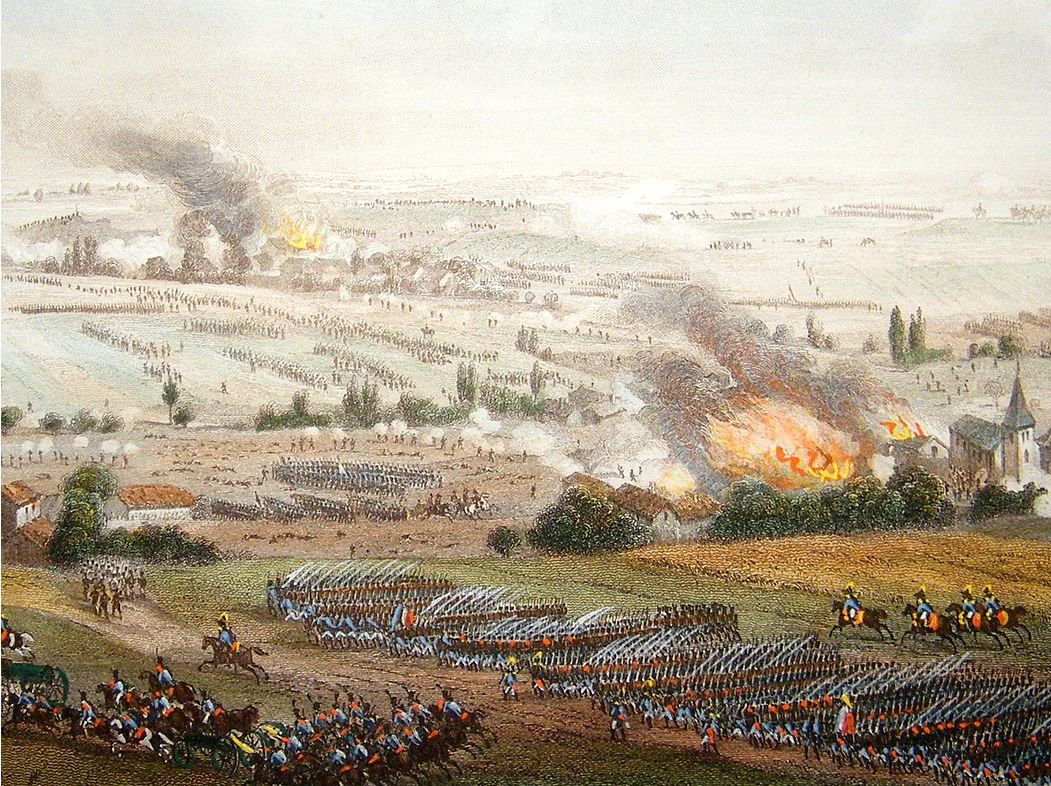
- The Battle of Ligny by Theodore Jung
Date	16 June 1815
Location	Ligny, United Kingdom of the Netherlands 50.52027°N 4.58140°E
Result	French victory

Belligerents
France	Prussia

Commanders and leaders
(First French Empire) Napoleon Bonaparte (First French Empire) Jean-de-Dieu Soult (First French Empire) Emmanuel de Grouchy (First French Empire) Antoine Drouot (First French Empire) Dominique Vandamme (First French Empire) Étienne Maurice Gérard	(Kingdom of Prussia) Gebhard von Blücher (WIA) (Kingdom of Prussia) Graf von Gneisenau (Kingdom of Prussia) Graf von Zieten (Kingdom of Prussia) Ludwig von Pirch (Kingdom of Prussia) Johann von Thielmann

Units involved
(First French Empire) Armée du Nord	(Kingdom of Prussia) Armee vom Niederrhein [de]; (Kingdom of Saxony) Saxon contingent; Rhenish contingents; Lower Rhine; Westphalia; Jülich-Cleves-Berg

Strength
62,882 (Note: 58,000; 62,882; 68,000; 76,800); 210 cannons	83,417 (Note: 83,417; 84,000; 86,569); 224 cannons

Casualties and losses
8,300–12,000 killed, wounded or captured (Note: 8,300 to 9,100; 11,500; 12,000)	16,000 killed or wounded 8,000 deserters captured or missing 21 guns lost

Hundred Days:
Waterloo campaign
current battle
Napoleon in command
Napoleon not in command

The Battle of Ligny, in which French troops of the Armée du Nord under the command of Napoleon I defeated part of a Prussian army under Field Marshal Blücher, was fought on 16 June 1815 near Ligny in what is now Belgium. The result was a tactical victory for the French, but the bulk of the Prussian army survived the battle in good order, was reinforced by Prussian troops who had not fought at Ligny, and played a role two days later at the Battle of Waterloo. Ligny was the last victory in Napoleon's military career. In the culminating moment of this battle Blücher was wounded and carried off the battlefield, and was replaced by his chief of staff, Lieutenant General Gneisenau.

== Prelude ==
Map of the Waterloo campaign

On 13 March 1815, six days before Napoleon reached Paris, the powers at the Congress of Vienna declared him an outlaw; four days later, the United Kingdom, Russia, Austria, and Prussia bound themselves to put 150,000 men each into the field to end his rule. Napoleon knew that once his attempts at dissuading one or more of the Seventh Coalition Allies from invading France had failed, his only chance of remaining in power was to attack before the Coalition could put together an overwhelming force. If he could destroy the existing Coalition forces south of Brussels before they were reinforced, he might be able to drive the British back to the sea and knock the Prussians out of the war. The Duke of Wellington expected Napoleon to try to envelop the Coalition armies, a maneuver that he had successfully used many times before, by moving through Mons to the south-west of Brussels. The roads to Mons were paved, which would have enabled a rapid flank march. This would have cut Wellington's communications with his base at Ostend, but would also have pushed his army closer to Blücher's. In fact, Napoleon planned instead to divide the two Coalition armies and defeat them separately, and he encouraged Wellington's misapprehension with false intelligence. Moving up to the frontier without alerting the Coalition, Napoleon divided his army into three elements which remained close enough to support one another: a left wing commanded by Marshal Ney, a right wing commanded by Marshal Grouchy, and a reserve, which he commanded personally. Crossing the frontier at Thuin near Charleroi before dawn on 15 June, the French rapidly overran Coalition outposts and secured Napoleon's favored "central position" at the junction between the area where Wellington's allied army was dispersed to his north-west, and Blücher's Prussian army to the north-east.

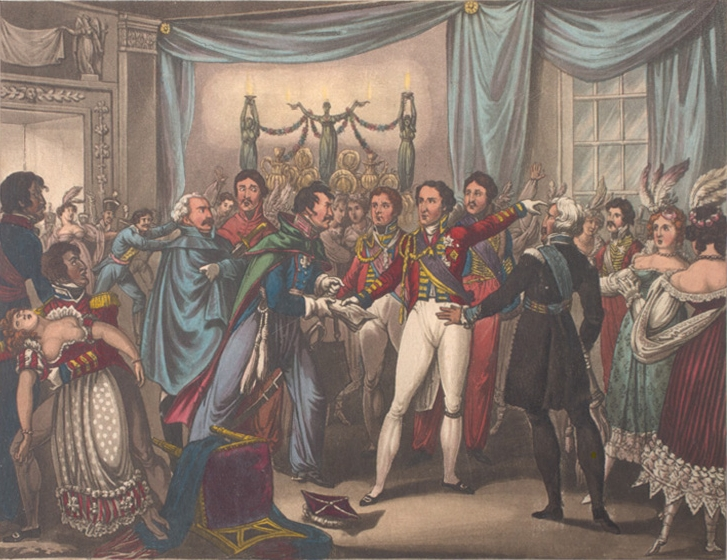
A Prussian officer informs the Duke of Wellington – who was attending the Duchess of Richmond's ball – that the French have crossed the border at Charleroi and that the Prussians would concentrate their army at Ligny.

Only very late on the night of 15 June was Wellington certain that the Charleroi attack was the main French thrust, and he duly ordered his army to deploy near Nivelles and Quatre Bras. Early on the morning of 16 June, at the Duchess of Richmond's ball, on receiving a dispatch from the Prince of Orange, he was shocked by the speed of Napoleon's advance, and hastily sent his army in the direction of Quatre Bras, where the Prince of Orange, with the brigade of Prince Bernhard of Saxe-Weimar, was holding a tenuous position against the French left commanded by Marshal Ney. Ney's orders were to secure the crossroads of Quatre Bras so that if necessary he could later swing east and reinforce Napoleon.

As Napoleon considered the concentrated Prussian army the greater threat, he moved against them first. Lieutenant-General Zieten's I Corps rearguard action on 15 June held up the French advance, allowing Blücher to concentrate his forces in the Sombreffe position, which had been selected earlier for its good defensive attributes.

Napoleon's original plan for 16 June was based on the assumption that the Coalition forces, which had been caught napping, would not attempt a risky forward concentration, and he intended, therefore, to push an advance guard as far as Gembloux, to feel for and ward off Blücher. To assist this operation the reserve would move at first to Fleurus to reinforce Grouchy, should he need assistance in driving back Blücher's troops; but, once in possession of Sombreffe, Napoleon would swing the reserve westwards and join Ney, who, it was supposed, would have in the meantime mastered Quatre Bras.

In pursuance of this object Ney, to whom III Cavalry Corps (Kellermann) was now attached, was to mass at Quatre Bras and push an advanced guard 10 kilometres (6.2 mi) northward of that place, with a connecting division at Marbais to link him with Grouchy. The centre and left-wing together would then make a night-march to Brussels. The Coalition forces would thus be irremediably sundered, and all that remained would be to destroy them in detail. Napoleon now awaited further information from his wing commanders at Charleroi, where he massed the VI Corps (Lobau), to save it, if possible, from a harassing countermarch, as it appeared likely that it would only be wanted for the march to Brussels. Ney spent the morning in massing his I and II corps, and in reconnoitring the enemy at Quatre Bras, who, as he was informed, had been reinforced. But up till noon, he took no serious step to capture the crossroads, which then lay at his mercy. Grouchy meantime reported from Fleurus that Prussians were coming up from Namur, but Napoleon does not appear to have attached much importance to this report. He was still at Charleroi when, between 09:00 and 10:00, further news reached him from the left that considerable hostile forces were visible at Quatre Bras. He at once wrote to Ney saying that these could only be some of Wellington's troops and that Ney was to concentrate his force and crush what was in front of him, adding that he was to send all reports to Fleurus. Then, keeping Lobau provisionally at Charleroi, Napoleon hastened to Fleurus, arriving about 11:00.

== Armies ==
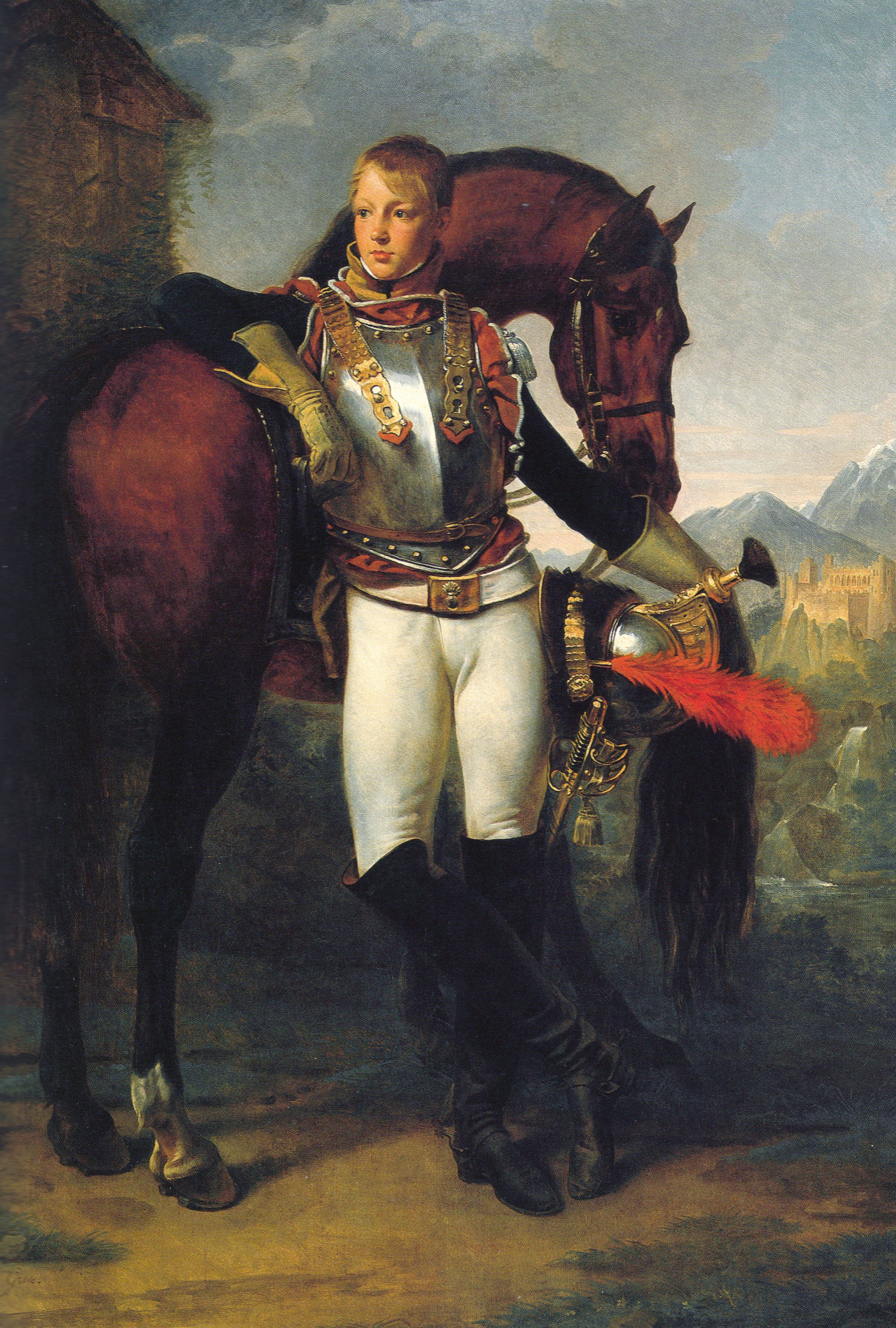
French cuirassier officer

The French Armee du Nord (Army of the North) was commanded by veteran officers and headed by Napoleon himself, who had won dozens of battles. Directly under him were three Marshals, Grouchy, Ney, and Soult, all generals of renown and bravery. The corps and division generals were well known for ability and with several campaigns behind them. The troops of the Army of the North were, for the most part, experienced veterans who had seen at least one battle. While the mix of veterans was higher than in either of the other armies, many of the troops had never worked with one another before nor under their officers. Trust in one another and their officers was therefore in short supply. For all that we may count the veterans, it was noted that there were many in the French formations that had never been under fire. In the words of Henri Houssaye, "Napoleon had never held in his hand an instrument so fearsome or fragile". In equipment and supply, the French were well set with both, although the Guard units had to suffer standard weapons, and the Army of the North had more cavalry than their opponents throughout the four days of battle that would follow and end at Waterloo.

By contrast, the Prussian Army was, at this point, in a state of disorganization and rebuilding. According to historian Peter Hofschröer "The armed forces fielded by the Kingdom of Prussia in 1815 were in terms of quality of manpower, equipment, and coherence of organization probably the worst fielded by Prussia in the Revolutionary and Napoleonic Wars." The Prussian cavalry was reorganizing and converting the Freecorps and Legions into regular cavalry formations. The artillery was lacking guns and needed equipment and guns and equipment continued to arrive from Prussia even as the battles were raging. No less than one-third of the Prussian Infantry consisted of Landwehr (militia) and, unlike the Landwehr of 1813/1814, these were untrained. Hofschröer says that "they could be counted to go forward in disorder and retreat in chaos". To further compound the Prussians' problems, the Saxon and Rhinelander contingents were recent additions to the Prussian Army and, having been until recently part of the French Army, they were reluctant to participate. Some Saxons rebelled and were sent home before the French advanced, and many of the Rhinelanders would also desert and head home during the battle.

== Prussian preparations ==
The Prussians were not caught napping and set up a series of artillery/cavalry outposts whereby the cavalry patrolled the front and raced back to the artillery which would fire cannon in a prearranged signal. In this way, the thinly stretched 1st and 2nd Brigades were promptly alerted and began rapid assembly. General Zieten's I Corps began a difficult fighting withdrawal, giving time for the Prussian Army to assemble. The post chain was a relay of towns, each set up as a fortified village. Each was commanded by a Prussian officer who made sure that the post kept enough horses, forage, and troops to move messages efficiently along. Also, these posts served as intelligence posts where surveillance would take place, stragglers would be collected, and wandering civilians would be closely questioned. A posted chain was set up back to Blücher's command post so that the Headquarters was alerted from the time of the first French deployment. General Steinmetz' 1st brigade of the I Corps had been very active in touring his outposts on 12 May, 17 May, 21 May, and 9 June. Out posting and intelligence collection were given proper weight.

Reports sent back to General Steinmetz indicated that an attack was seen as imminent as soon as 12 June. During the period of 12 June through to 14 June reports were sent by the I Corps brigade commanders and General Zieten himself to General Blücher and General Wellington. Also, communications were made with the Dutch cavalry adjoining I Corps position to the west. Notably, General Steinmetz ordered his brigade to assemble for defense on the night of 13 June and General Pirch II (Note: "'Pirch I', the use of Roman numerals being used in Prussian service to distinguish officers of the same name, in this case from his brother, seven years his junior, Otto Karl Lorenz 'Pirch II'") on the morning of the 14th, so thick was French deployments to their front. The first French attacks were to take place on 15 June.

== Converging towards battle ==
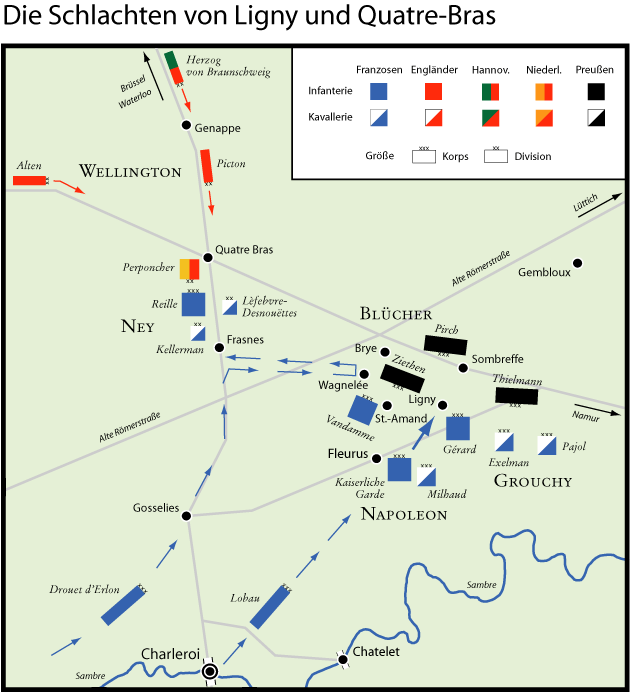

On 15 June Napoleon had crossed the Sambre at Charleroi and had pushed a wedge between Wellington and Blücher. His army was divided into three parts: on the left-wing one corps and two cavalry divisions stood under the command of Marshal Ney, on the right-wing two cavalry corps under Marshal Grouchy and in the centre three corps (including the Imperial Guard) and Milhaud's IV Cavalry Corps (cuirassiers) as a heavy cavalry reserve under the command of Napoleon. Napoleon's most important goal consisted of keeping the two opposing armies separated and striking each individually. For this purpose, Ney would move against the Anglo-allies on Quatre Bras and hold Wellington's forces there. At the same time the French III Corps under Vandamme and IV Corps under Gérard would attack the Prussians frontally on their line of defense between Wagnelée, Saint-Amand and Ligny, while Grouchy marched on Sombreffe. Vandamme's corps was reinforced by General Girard's 7th Infantry Division, detached from Reille's II Corps, the bulk of which was at Quatre Bras. Napoleon wanted to advance in the centre of the Prussian position at Fleurus and decide the battle with a final advance by the Old Guard. The plan of separation of opposing armies and defeat in detail was an old and favored stratagem of Napoleon's, dating back to his operations in Italy, and had been the deciding factor in his campaigns in Austria, and in his battles with the Fifth Coalition.

Blücher's troops consisted of the I Prussian Corps under Zieten, the II Corps under Pirch I and the III Corps under Thielmann. The I Corps was located in the foremost row and had support from the II Corps standing behind it – the task, the defence of the villages of Ligny, Brye, and Saint-Amand, while the III Corps formed the left wing and the routes of withdrawal while defending Gembloux and Namur. Blücher and Wellington had to avoid above all being separated. Still in the morning of the battle Wellington rode to a meeting with Blücher at the windmill of Brye (or Bussy) and promised Blücher the support of at least one Anglo-allied corps. After the break for discussion with Blücher, Wellington left for Quatre Bras.

William Siborne, writing from eyewitness accounts, records it thus:

"Upon a calculation being made, however, of the time which would elapse ere the Duke would be able to collect the requisite force for undertaking this operation, and of the possibility of Blucher being defeated before it could be carried into effect, it was considered preferable that Wellington should, if practicable, move to the support of the Prussian Right by the Namur road. But a direct support of this kind was necessarily contingent on circumstances, and subject to the Duke's discretion. The latter having expressed his confident expectation of being enabled to afford the desired support, as also of his succeeding in concentrating, very shortly, a sufficient force to assume the offensive, rode back to Quatre Bras."

In reaction to the troop movements of the French, II and III Corps began sending reinforcements to I Corps under General Ziethen. The Prussian front lines were too long for the troops immediately available and were dependent on the arrival of the IV Corps under Bülow advancing from Liège and the support of the promised Anglo-allied corps.

The Prussians now faced the French with 82,700 troops, with the French Army numbering around 60,800 available troops.

== Battlefield ==
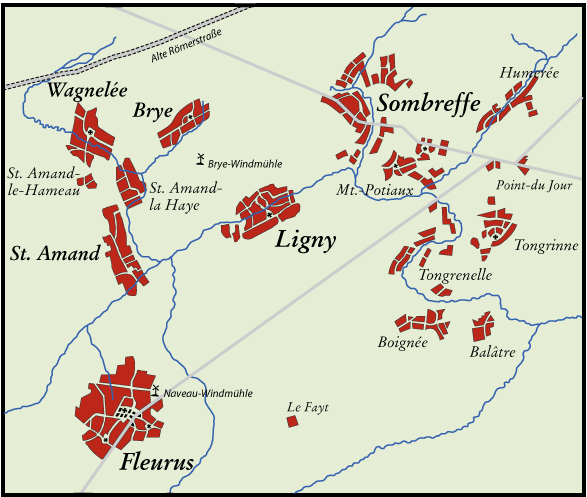

The battlefield of Ligny was on the watershed between the rivers Scheldt and Meuse. The Ligny stream rises to the west of Fleurus and meanders in a northeast direction through the small village of Ligny to the confluence at Sombreffe. The stream was only a few metres wide at its edges, however, it was swampy in parts so that the bridges at Saint-Amand and Ligny were strategically important. This dictated that villages of Ligny, and St Amand and Wagnelée – connected by the hamlets of Saint Amand-le-Hameau and Saint Amand-la-Haye – were the best defensive position because they were sturdily built and surrounded by trees. The remaining parts of the battlefield consisted of fields of grain as high as a man. The windmill of Brye on a hill north-west from Ligny was a suitable vantage point and Blücher made it his headquarters during the battle. Napoleon placed his headquarters in Fleurus, where he also had a good view of the battlefield from the windmill of Naveau.

== Battle ==
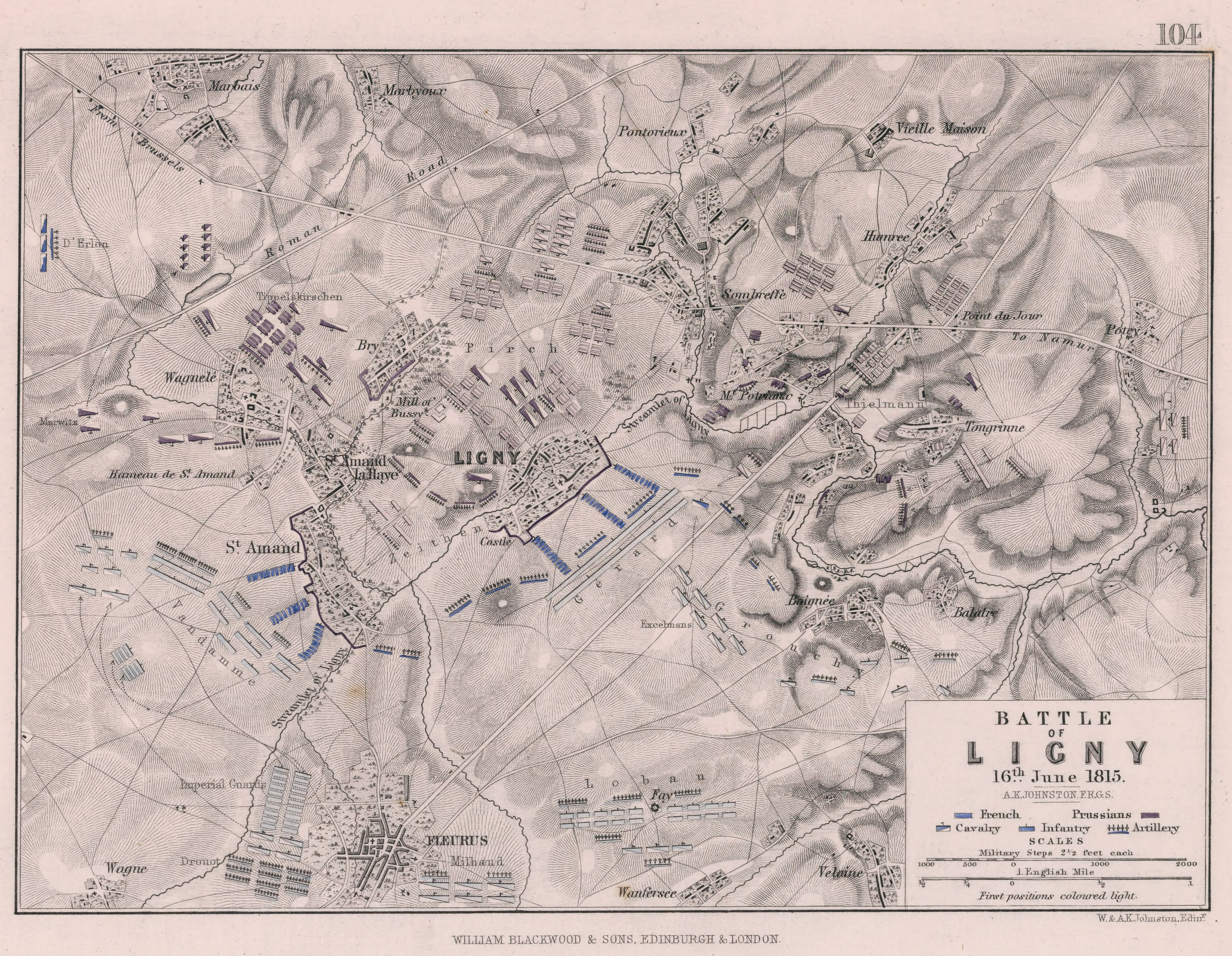
Map of the Battle of Ligny, 16 June 1815 (Atlas to Alison's history of Europe)

=== Saint-Amand ===
Napoleon delayed his attack until about 14:30 when he heard cannon fire coming from the direction of Quatre Bras, and thus knew that his left flank was secure. This delay also gave Gérard's IV Corps more time to deploy as it had only recently arrived in Fleurus from the south-west, and had an important role to play in Napoleon's plan of attack on Ligny. Both delays meant that there was less time to win a decisive victory before night fell.

Napoleon began the attack with a cannonade by the Guards artillery positioned around Fleurus. Shortly afterwards Vandamme's III French Corps (Girard's 7th Infantry Division attached on its left) attacked the hamlet of Saint-Amand-la-Haye. Jagow's 3rd Prussian Brigade, defending Saint-Amand-la-Haye, could not withstand the pressure of Lefol's 8th Division and was forced to retreat. Shortly afterwards a counterattack by General Steinmetz with six battalions of the 1st Brigade recaptured the hamlet. A renewed attack by Vandamme's troops led to a bitter fight in which the Prussians lost approximately 2,500 men and possession of Saint-Amand-la-Haye.

With the loss of Saint-Amand-la-Haye, Blücher's right flank threatened to give way, so he ordered Pirch II's 2nd Prussian Brigade to retake Saint-Amand-la-Haye. Although Girard was mortally wounded (dying in Paris on 25 June of his wounds) the French held the hamlet, so Blücher ordered Tippelskirch to envelop the French with an attack by units of the II Corps on the left flank of the hamlet. French reinforcements (Vandamme's III Corps) deployed in front of Wagnelée prevented this happening, attacking Tippelskirch's brigades as they marched out of the grain fields to get into position for their attack. They were driven into the hamlet.

Blücher left his observation post in the windmill of Brye and intervened personally in the fight. Under his guidance, the Prussian counter-attack on the French, very weak from the preceding actions, succeeded, and Saint-Amand-la-Haye was again in Prussian hands. Thus at 19:00 Saint-Amand, Saint-Amand-la-Haye and Wagnelée were still held by the Prussians.

=== Ligny ===
At 15:00 Gérard's IV French Corps opened the battle around Ligny. Under heavy Prussian artillery fire Pécheux's 12th Infantry Division succeeded in capturing the church in the village of Ligny. With this success, however, came a price as the division now found itself under a violent bombardment from three sides. In a short time, Pécheux's division lost 20 officers and 500 men and had to withdraw. Napoleon sent a battery of 12-pounders to support another attack and with the IV Corps artillery set numerous buildings in Ligny aflame. Another attack followed with vicious house-to-house fighting, then Jagow's 3rd Prussian Brigade counter-attacked and recaptured the town.

The Prussian second lieutenant, Gerhard Andreas von Garrelts, later gave an eye-witness account of the agonies of the Belgian civilian population, caught unexpectedly in the centre of battle:

Ligny stood half on fire, locked in bright flames [...] on this occasion we found we were in a house, where all windows were destroyed, two old people, a man and a woman, showing no emotion and dazed sat at the hearth, without moving, his elbows on his knees and his head supported by his hands; the vision made us cry! Probably they had seen armed combat and were not surprised, how else could they distance themselves with death so near; we too were familiar with death, we felt compassion for these old people, but they could not be convinced to move from their home.

— Gerhard Andreas von Garrelts.

=== Missed chance ===
At about 17:00 Field-Marshal Blücher employed the still-fresh II Corps under the command of General Pirch I and ordered him to deploy it into the area south of Brye. At about the same time Vandamme on the left French flank sighted a force of twenty to thirty thousand men advancing on Fleurus, which he incorrectly took to be enemy troops. Napoleon, who was preparing to launch a crucial attack at the centre of Blücher's line, was very surprised by this news because at 15:30 he had sent Comte de la Bédoyère with a written note to Marshal Ney at Quatre Bras ordering him to send d'Erlon's I Corps to attack the rear of the right Prussian flank. Instead, it seemed that the troops seen by Vandamme threatened the French left flank.

D'Erlon had gone on ahead of his corps (marching west towards Quatre Bras) to reconnoitre. Bédoyère, realising that time was of the essence, had on his initiative ordered the I Corps to turn east towards Ligny. Its leading elements came into view at 17:00, that is to say, earlier than Napoleon expected. Marshal Ney, unaware of Napoleon's instructions, sent an order to d'Erlon to immediately turn around and march back towards Quatre Bras. D'Erlon, who had caught up with his troops, turned them around only a few kilometres away from Ligny. Crucially, the I Corps did not fight in either battle that day.

Blücher took advantage of the hesitation of the French by ordering an attack on the French left flank. From his observation post in the mill of Brye, Blücher could observe how his troops fared to the west of Saint Amand. Vandamme's III Corps received unexpected support from Duhesme's Young Guard and the Prussians were thrown back to their original positions.

=== Prussian counter-attack ===
At 19:00 the situation on the battlefield was as follows: Grouchy's cavalry had captured Tongrenelle and advanced on Mont-Potiaux; in the centre, heavy fighting was taking place around Ligny; on the Prussian right flank, there was a lull in the fighting between the Young Guard and the Prussians.

It was now that Blücher received a message that Wellington was heavily engaged fighting Ney's left wing of the French army and, therefore, could on no account send support to Ligny. So Blücher decided to counter-attack on the French left flank, to force a decision. First, he strengthened his tired forces in Ligny, and then he collected his last reserves and personally led an attack on Saint-Amand. The attack was initially successful and the Prussians managed to recapture Saint-Amand-le-Hameau, but the attack faltered and they were counter-attacked by chasseurs of the Imperial Guard west of Saint-Amand and started a disorderly retreat from Saint-Amand-le-Haye.

=== Napoleon commits the Old Guard ===
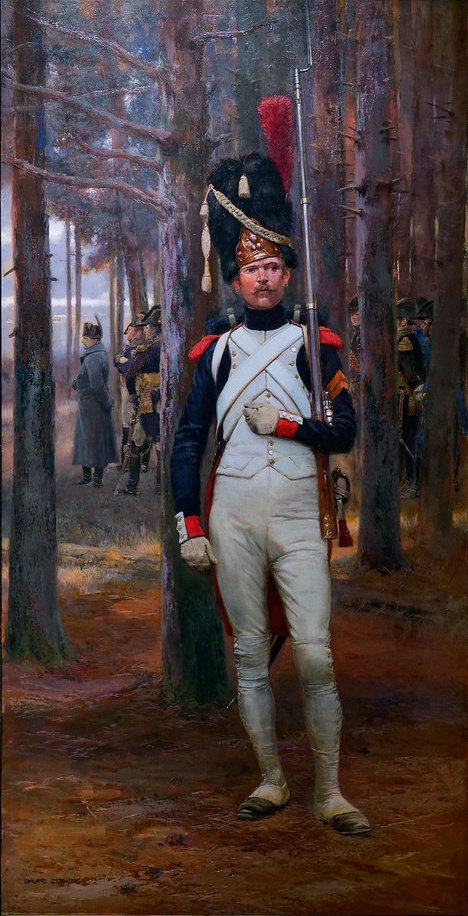
Grenadier of the Old Guard, by Edouard Detaille

Taking advantage of the Prussians' retreat, Napoleon decided it was time to launch a decisive counterstrike. He could at least beat Blücher and render the Prussians unfit for any serious operation except retreat on 17 June, although he could no longer expect to destroy the Prussian army. Lobau's VI Corps, too, was now arriving and forming up on the heights east of Fleurus. The artillery of the Guard, therefore, came into action above Ligny to prepare Blücher's centre for assault. Some delay was occasioned by a thunderstorm; but, as this passed over, the guns opened and the Old Guard, supported by the reserve cavalry – the Grenadiers à Cheval de la Garde Impériale – led by Guyot, as well as Milhaud's IV Cavalry Corps proceeded to form up opposite Ligny. At about 19:45 a crashing salvo of 60 guns gave the signal for a combined assault to be delivered by Gerard and the Guard, with Milhaud's cavalry moving on their right flank. Initially, the French Guard encountered heavy resistance, and was forced back momentarily by the Prussian reserves. However Blücher's worn-out soldiers at that section of the line could not withstand the concentrated impact of Napoleon's choicest troops, combined with a flanking movement by a division of French infantry under cover of the darkness, and at around 20:30 the Prussian centre at Ligny was overwhelmed.

The Prussians formed a new defensive line between Brye and Sombreffe, on the heights about 1.6 kilometres (1 mi) behind Ligny. Units of the I Corps and II Corps retreated to this new position and rallied, fending off French attacks as they did so.

In the words of William Siborne:

The Prussian infantry compelled to evacuate Ligny, effected its retreat in squares, in perfect order, though surrounded by the enemy, bravely repelling all further attacks, made in the repeated but vain attempts to scatter it in confusion.

=== Blücher is incapacitated ===
As a reaction to the Old Guard's attack, Blücher instructed Lieutenant-General Röder to counter-attack with the two brigades of the reserve cavalry of the I Prussian Corps. While leading one of the charges in person, the 72-year-old Blücher's horse was shot and fell upon him. He was rescued and borne in a semi-conscious condition from the field. While Blücher was being taken from the field the French cavalry beat off the Prussian cavalry counter-attack. Lieutenant-General August von Gneisenau (Blücher's Chief of staff), took over command from the absent Blücher.

=== Prussian retreat ===
Sources differ over Gneisenau's leadership while Blücher was incapacitated. Chesney credits him with the decision to retreat north in support of Wellington: "Gneisenau, coming into temporary command after the fall of Blucher at the end of the battle, and finding the struggle for the present hopelessly decided, chose at all risk of inconvenience to abstain from the notion of a retreat to the east, and to keep as near as might be to the English army." [Chesney 1869, pp. 142–143]. Glover also writes "A retreat on Gembloux by the entire army would be the obvious course of action, except that this would lead to a complete break of contact with Wellington. Gneisenau therefore initially ordered a retreat directly north on Tilly, which would maintain that contact". However, Parkinson, citing Prussian records, claims Gneisenau "raged" over the lack of British support at Ligny and decided to retreat east after Tilly: "And slowly, fatefully, Gneisenau's choice of retreat route swung towards Liege - abandoning Wellington to face Napoleon alone, outnumbered." [pp. 228–229] Blücher later summoned his British liaison officer, Sir Harry Hardinge, to inform him: "Gneisenau has given in. We are going to join the Duke." [Parkinson p. 232]. "This decision by Blücher is unquestionably worthy of the highest praise. Ignoring all the false courses of action that traditional practices and misplaced prudence might have suggested in such a case, he followed his common sense and decided to turn toward Wellington on the 18th, preferring to abandon his own line of communications rather than adopt half-measures. The battle he had lost had not been a rout. It had reduced the size of his force by only about one-sixth, and with nearly 100,000 men he could undoubtedly turn the battle that the Duke of Wellington was confronting into a victory". It is noteworthy that when Blücher was found alive, he refused to consider resigning his command on account of his injuries, declaring he would rather have himself "tied to a horse than resign". [Parkinson p. 229].

At about 22:00 the order to fall back was given. On the Prussian right, Lieutenant-General Zieten's I Corps retreated slowly with most of its artillery, leaving a rear-guard close to Brye to slow any French pursuit. Pirch I's II Corps followed the I Corps off the battlefield. They formed up again within a quarter of a league of the field of battle (about 3/4 of a mile), and retired to Wavre via Tilly, free of French pursuit. "Our infantry, posted behind Ligny, though forced to retreat, did not suffer itself to be discouraged … Formed in masses, it coolly repulsed all the attacks of the cavalry, and retreated in good order upon the height, whence it continued its retrograde movement upon Tilly. … At the distance of a quarter of a league from the field of battle, the army formed again. The enemy did not venture to pursue it. The village of Brie remained in our possession during the night, as well as Sombref, where General Thielemann had fought with the 3rd Corps". "At 10 o’clock the order to fall back was given, and the centre and right retrograded in perfect order. Forming again within a quarter of a league of the field of battle, they recommenced their retreat; and, unmolested by the enemy, retired upon Wavre".

On the left, Lieutenant-General Thielemann's largely-unharmed III Corps withdrew last with the army's various parks in tow, toward Gembloux where Bulow waited with the newly arrived IV Corps. He left a strong rear-guard at Sombreffe. "[Gneisenau], having undertaken the direction of affairs, ordered the retreat of the First and II Corps upon Tilly, and despatched Colonel Thile with directions to Thielemann, that if he could not effect a direct retreat upon Tilly, he was to retire upon Gembloux, there to unite with Bulow, and then effect a junction with the rest of the army".

The village of Brye remained in Prussian possession (I Corps) during the night, as well as Sombref, where the III Corps had held Grouchy all day. The bulk of the rear-guards held their positions until about midnight. The final units of Zieten's I Corps rear-guard only left the battlefield at daybreak on 17 June, as the exhausted French failed to press on. The last of III Corps was moved in the morning of 17 June completely ignored.

Von Bülow's IV Corps, which had not been engaged at Ligny, moved to a location south of Wavre and set up a strong position on which the other elements of the Prussian army could reassemble. Blücher was already in communication with Wellington. "The Field Marshall promised to come with his whole army; he even proposed, in case Napoleon should not attack, that the Allies themselves, with their whole united force, should attack him the next day. This may serve to show how little the battle of the 16th had disorganised the Prussian army, or weakened its moral strength".

Under the circumstances, the overall results of Ligny cannot appear out of the ordinary. It is a battle which 78,000 men lost to 75,000 by very slight tipping of the scales, after a long struggle, and without any truly glorious results for the victor, since his trophies consisted of only 21 guns and perhaps a few thousand prisoners.

— Carl von Clausewitz.

8,000 troops fled to Liege and Aachen. These were mainly new draftees from the Rhenish and Westphalian provinces, and the Duchy of Berg. Some of the Rhine provinces had previously been a part of France, and their contingents included old French soldiers.

=== Gallery ===
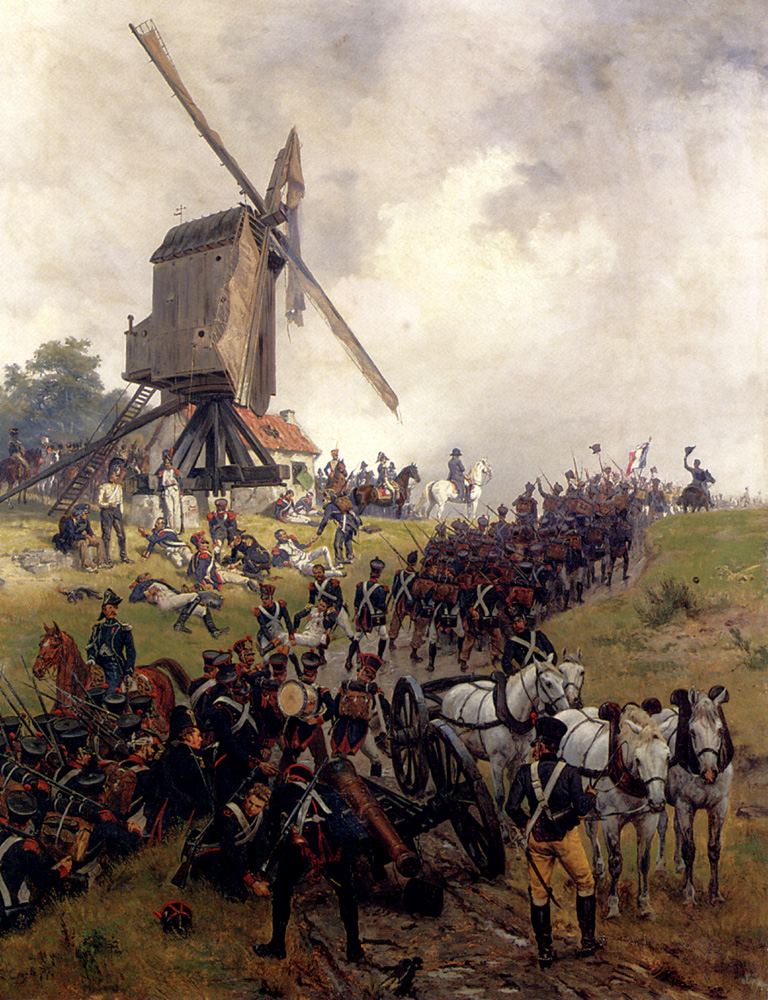
Ligny. The advancing French pass Napoleon. Painted by Ernest Crofts (1875). This representation shows Napoleon surrounded by his staff surveying the battlefield while columns of infantry advance to the front. The windmill is probably that on the heights of Naveau, which served as Napoleon's command post during the battle.

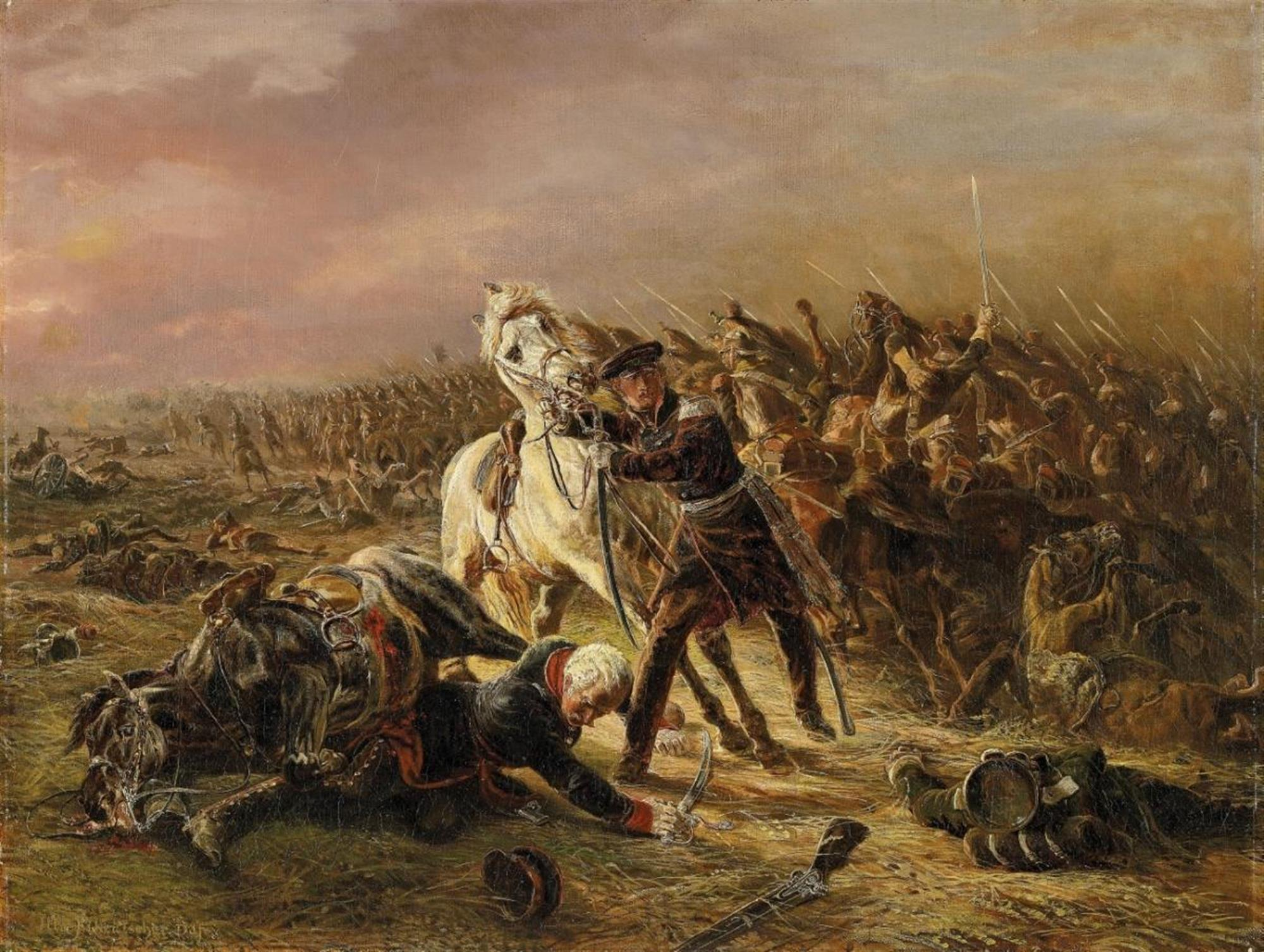
Blücher was wounded and fell from his horse. His adjutant Nostitz is next to him. (c. 1862)

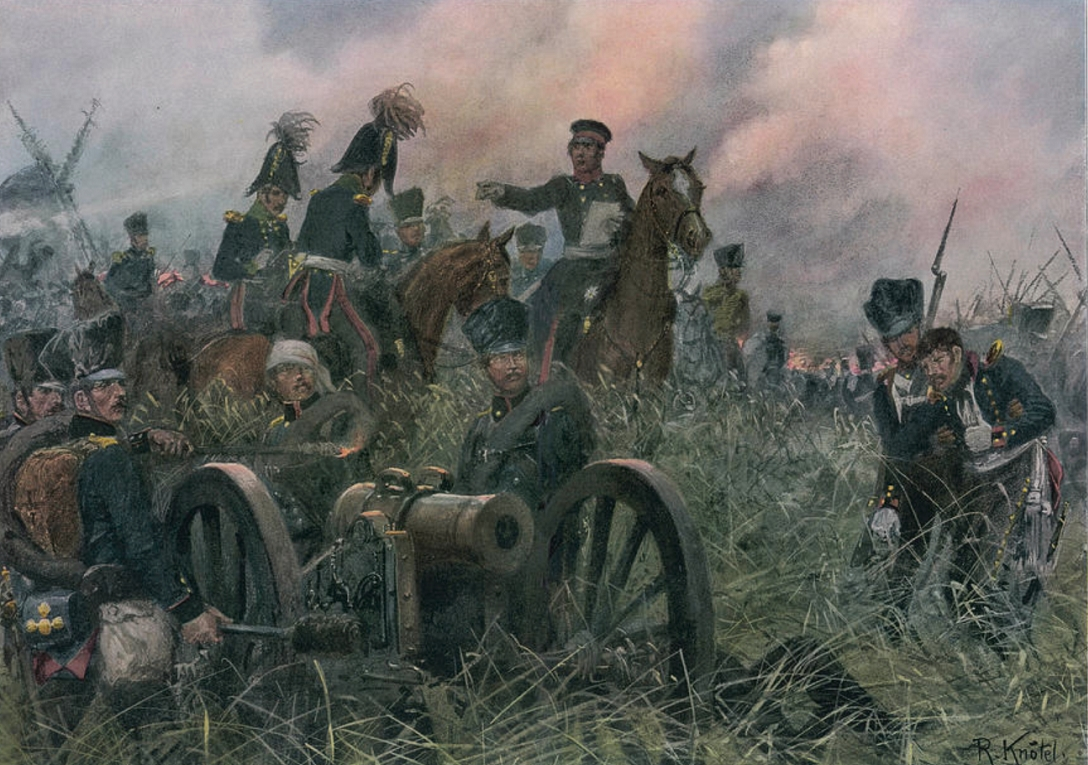
Gneisenau at Ligny (1900)

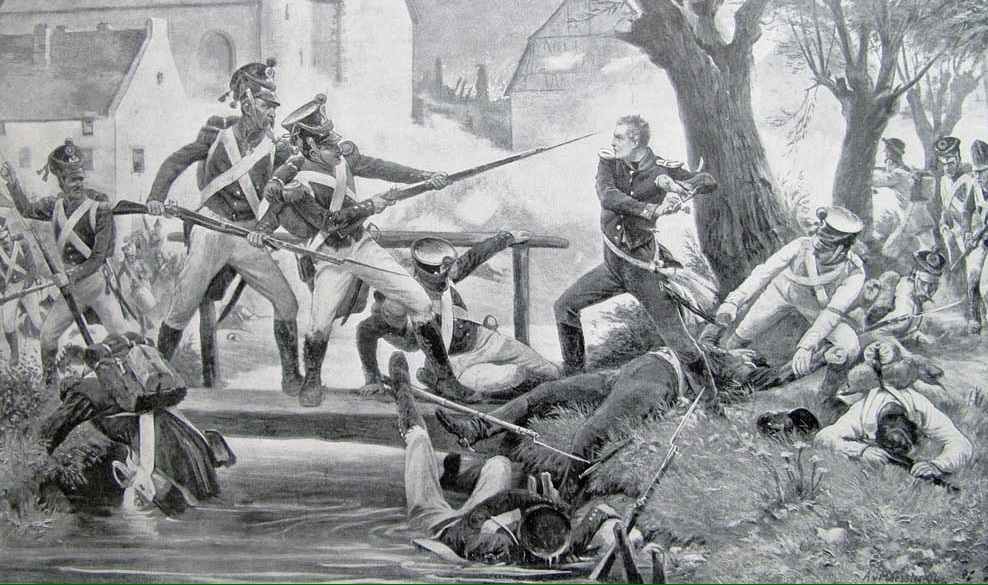
Prussian lieutenant Schmeling repelling French infantry in front of farm of En Bas. Engraved by Adalbert von Rössler (1899).

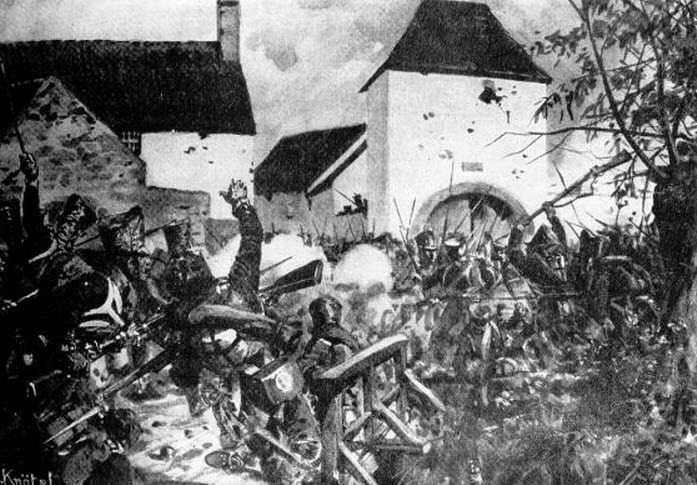
Battle for Ferme d'en-Haut. Artist Richard Knötel

== Aftermath ==
The retreat of the Prussians was not interrupted, and was seemingly unnoticed, by the French. Crucially, they retreated not to the east, along their lines of communication and away from Wellington, but northwards, parallel to Wellington's line of march and still within supporting distance, and remained throughout in communication with Wellington. They regrouped south of Wavre, around 13 kilometres (8 mi) march to the east of Waterloo, from whence they proceeded to Waterloo on 18 June.

Wellington anticipated that Napoleon would then come against him at Quatre Bras, so he spent 17 June retreating northwards to a defensive position he had personally reconnoitred the previous year at Mont-Saint-Jean, a low ridge south of the village of Waterloo and the Forest of Soignes. Napoleon, with the reserve and the right wing of the Army of the North, made a late start on 17 June and joined Ney at Quatre Bras at 13:00 to attack Wellington's army, but found only the rearguard of cavalry remaining on the site. The French pursued Wellington to Waterloo but managed only to defeat a small cavalry rearguard in an action at Genappe before torrential rain set in for the night. By the end of 17 June, Wellington's army had arrived at its position at Waterloo, with the main body of Napoleon's army following. The decisive battle of the campaign took place at Waterloo on 18 June 1815.

Before leaving Ligny, Napoleon gave Grouchy 33,000 men and orders to follow the retreating Prussians. A late start, uncertainty about the direction the Prussians had taken, and the vagueness of the orders given to Grouchy meant that he was too late to prevent the Prussian army reaching Wavre, from where Blücher could march to support Wellington at the Battle of Waterloo and Thielmann fought the Battle of Wavre. After the French defeat at Waterloo, only Grouchy managed to retreat in good order to France with his force of nearly 30,000 organised French soldiers with their artillery. However, this army was not strong enough to resist the combined coalition forces. Napoleon announced his abdication on 24 June 1815 and finally surrendered on 15 July.

== See also ==
- List of Napoleonic battles

== Notes ==
Preceded by Battle of Quatre Bras	Napoleonic Wars; Battle of Ligny	Succeeded by Battle of Waterloo
