= COBRA (radar) =

Counter-battery system

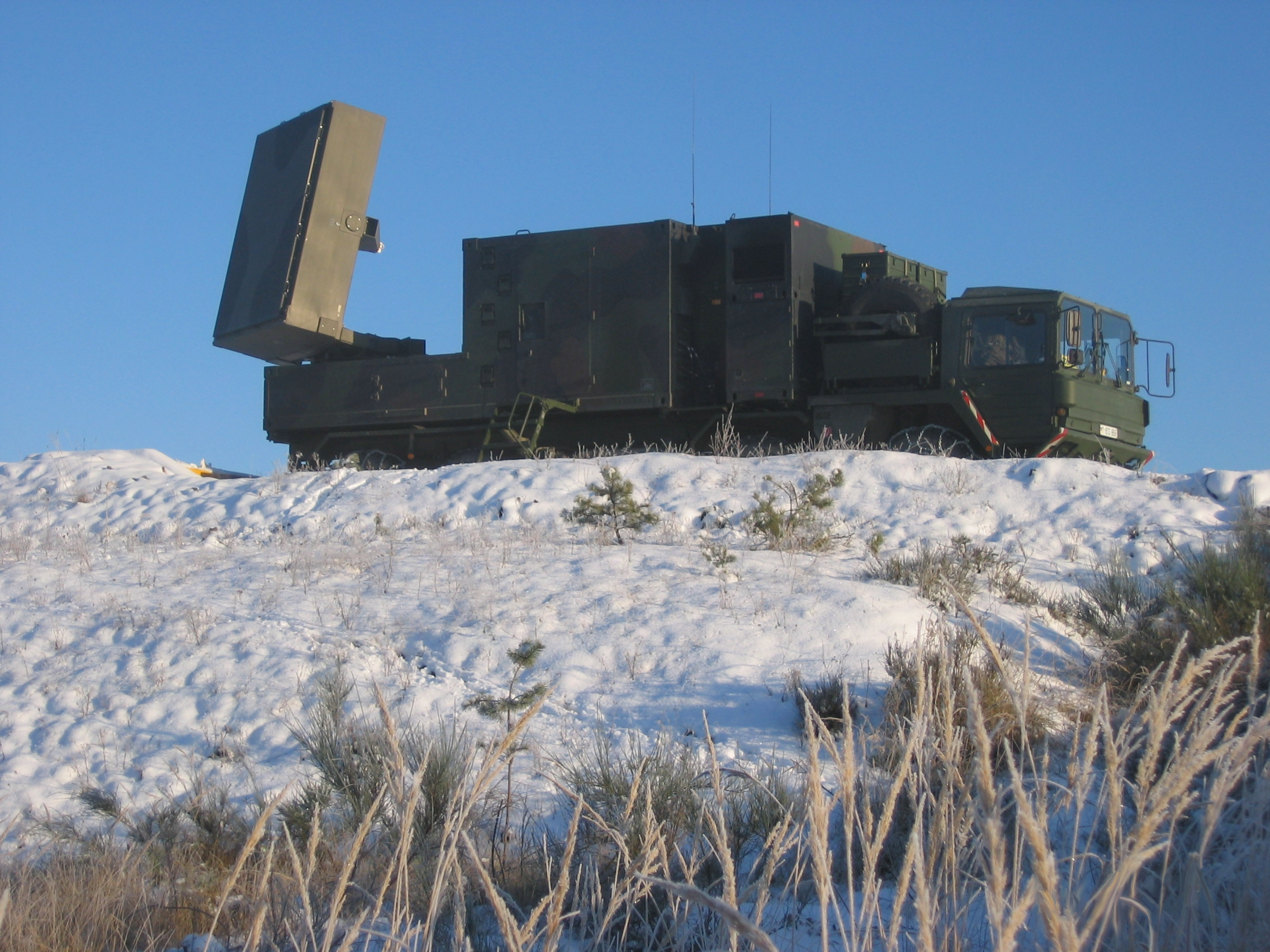
Bundeswehr COBRA on MAN gl chassis (2005)

COBRA COunter Battery RAdar is a Counter-battery radar system developed jointly by Thales, Airbus Defence and Space and Lockheed Martin for the French, British and German Armed Forces. It is a mobile Active electronically scanned array 3D radar based on a wheeled chassis for the purpose of enemy field artillery acquisition.

There are believed to be about 20,000 Gallium arsenide integrated circuits in each antenna. This enables the equipment to produce the locations of multiple enemy artillery at extremely long ranges, and the radar is able to cope with saturation type bombardments. In addition there is a high degree of automated software, with high speed circuitry and secure data transmission to escape detection from enemy electronic countermeasures.

For the COBRA mid-life upgrade (2024+) an inertial navigation system from iMAR Navigation is used.

== Operators ==
Map with COBRA operators in blue

=== Current operators ===
France (10)
10 purchased
Germany (9)
12 purchased, one donated to Ukraine in 2022, 2 sold to Turkey.

Jordan (5 donated by the UK)
The radars were donated by the UK in 2016, when the Army decided that the system was redundant with the Saab ARTHUR.

Saudi Arabia (4)
In 2017, the German government approved the export of COBRA radars to Saudi Arabia.

Turkey (2)
Radars purchased from Germany in 2007.

Ukraine (1)
In May 2022, it was reported that Ukraine had requested 40 COBRA systems from Germany amid the 2022 Russian invasion of Ukraine. One COBRA system was delivered later in September 2022.

United Arab Emirates (3)
3 ordered in 2009.

=== Former operator ===
United Kingdom
7 purchased, 5 donated to Jordan.

== See also ==
- AN/TPQ-36 Firefinder radar
- AN/TPQ-37 Firefinder radar
- Swathi Weapon Locating Radar
- Aistyonok
