= Adalbert von Rössler =

German painter and illustrator

Adalbert Heinrich Karl Ludwig Ernst von Rössler (Note: Further names: Adalbert von Roeßler; Adalbert von Rößler.) (29 August 1853, Wiesbaden – 19 March 1922, Berlin) was a German painter and illustrator.

== Sources ==
- Beyer, Andreas; Savoy, Bénédicte; Tegethoff, Wolf, eds. (2021). "Rössler, Adalbert von". Allgemeines Künstlerlexikon (online ed.). Berlin, New York: K. G. Saur.
