= Saint-Amand, Fleurus =

Saint-Amand Coat of Arms

Saint-Amand (French pronunciation: [sɛ̃t‿amɑ̃]; Walloon: Sint-Amand) is a village of Wallonia and a district of the municipality of Fleurus, located in the Arrondissement of Charleroi, province of Hainaut, Belgium.

Saint-Amand's postal code is 6221. Saint-Amand was its own municipality before the fusion of the Belgian municipalities in 1977 when it merged with Fleurus. Saint-Amand can be reached by traveling north about 2.5 kilometers from Fleurus on the Chemin de Saint-Amand, which is also known as the Rue Emmanuel Dumont de Chassart.

== Battle of Ligny ==
Saint-Amand was the scene of fierce fighting between the French and Prussian armies during the Battle of Ligny on 16 June 1815. Ligny is located 2.0 kilometers northeast of Saint-Amand. The French won the engagement but suffered 12,000 casualties. Prussian losses numbered as high as 16,000. The French defeat at the Battle of Waterloo two days later effectively ended the war. Captain H. de Mauduit of the French Old Guard wrote of the battle on the 16th,

At Ligny, more than 4,000 dead soldiers were piled on an area less in measurement than the Tuileries garden, some 300 or 400 yards square ... The aspect of the cemetery of S. Amand was not a whit less terrible ... The gallant 82nd of the Line (Girard's division), almost to a man lay here. (Note: Location of the Church: 50°30′15.19″N 4°32′59.33″E)

== Saint-Amand-la-Haye ==
Fighting also took place in the hamlet of La Haye centred around the farm of the same name. La Ferme de la Haye, à Saint-Amand still exists and on its wall next to the road is a plaque to the French General Jean-Baptiste Girard who was mortally wounded defending Saint-Amand against a Prussian counter-attack. (Note: Ferme de La Haye is located at the junction of Rue de la Croissette and Rue Brasseur (50°30′43.66″N 4°32′35.39″E))
