= Falnuée Castle =

Castle in Wallonia, Belgium

- Wallonia, Belgium
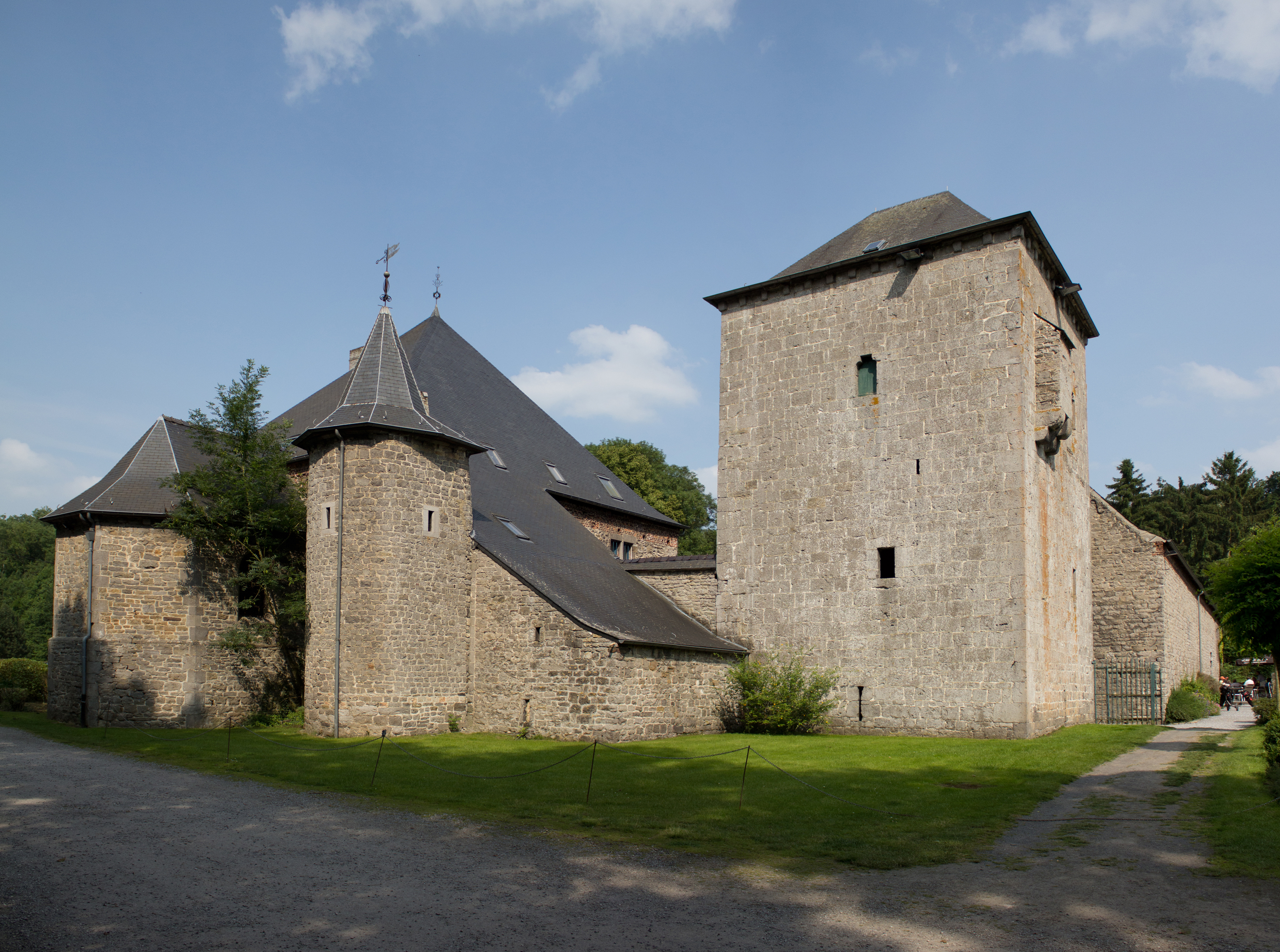
- Falnuée Castle

Site information
- Type: Castle

Location
- Coordinates: 50.5038°N 4.6701°E

Falnuée Castle (French: Château-ferme de Falnuée is a château-ferme (castle farm) in Mazy, in the municipality of Gembloux, province of Namur, Wallonia, Belgium. (Note: "The French word for castle is 'château', be it for an old medieval fortress ('château-fort') or a residential castle. The term 'château-ferme' means that a medieval castle has been transformed into a farm nowadays" ("Castles of Belgium". Eupedia.com.))

It is now a golf clubhouse.

== See also ==
- List of castles in Belgium
