= Schorbach =

- Commune
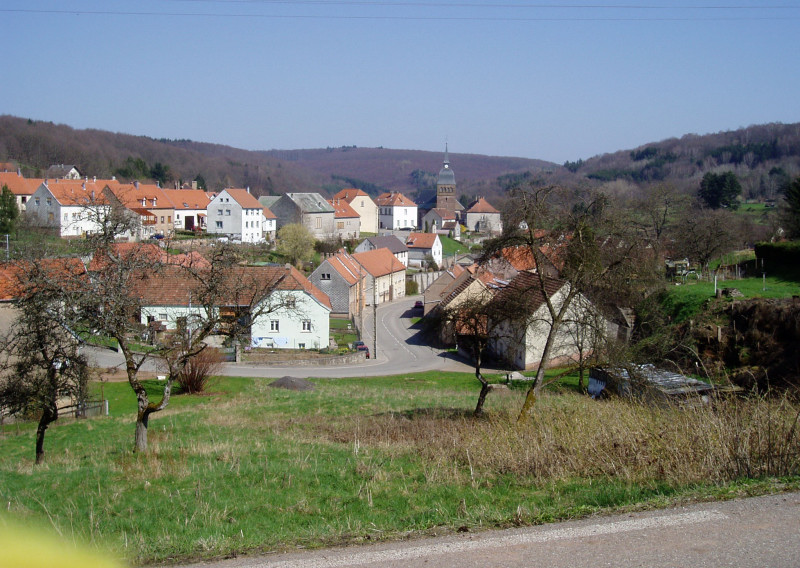
- A general view of Schorbach

- Coat of arms
- Location of Schorbach
- Location within France Location within Grand Est
- Coordinates: 49°04′48″N 7°24′24″E
- Country: France
- Region: Grand Est
- Department: Moselle
- Arrondissement: Sarreguemines
- Canton: Bitche
- Intercommunality: CC du Pays de Bitche

Government
  - Mayor (2020–2026): Paul Dellinger
- Area^{1}: 13.36 km^{2} (5.16 sq mi)
- Elevation: 415 m (1,362 ft)
- Highest elevation: 413 m (1,355 ft)
- Lowest elevation: 273 m (896 ft)
- Population (2023): 548
  - Density: 41.0/km^{2} (106/sq mi)
- Time zone: UTC+01:00 (CET)
  - Summer (DST): UTC+02:00 (CEST)
- INSEE/Postal code: 57639 /57230
- ^{1} French Land Register data, which excludes lakes, ponds, glaciers > 1 km^{2} (0.386 sq mi or 247 acres) and river estuaries.

Schorbach (French pronunciation: [ʃɔʁbak]) is a commune in the Moselle department of the Grand Est administrative region in north-eastern France.

The village belongs to the Pays de Bitche. As of 2013 Schorbach had 551 residents. The residents refer to themselves as Schorbachois, and are also known by the sobriquet Wurschtfresser, a name that refers to the annual Wurschtfescht (sausage feast) that is celebrated on Saint Rémi's day.

== Geography ==
Schorbach is a few kilometres South of the border with the Palatinate (Germany), North-east of Bitche. The commune is part of the Palatinate Forest-North Vosges Biosphere Reserve.

== History ==
The name Schor-Bach, probably meaning turtle-stream, is first seen in 1210. The place was long part of Zweibrücken-Bitsch.

Schorbach was an early seat of a church congregation, served by the Hornbach monastery, and until the French Revolution it remained the central church for the surrounding villages.

At the start of World War II, the inhabitants were evacuated to the Département of Charente. Schorbach was liberated by American troops on 16 March 1945.

== Population ==
Historical population
Year	Pop.	±% p.a.
1968	694	—
1975	695	+0.02%
1982	636	−1.26%
1990	649	+0.25%
1999	621	−0.49%
2007	589	−0.66%
2012	559	−1.04%
2017	540	−0.69%
2023	548	+0.25%
Source: INSEE

== Culture ==
The church of Saint Rémi, built on the site of a previous church inaugurated in 1143, on a rock overlooking the town, was the central parish church of the Pays de Bitche for many centuries. The founder of the church is unknown, but local history frequently ascribes the foundation to Berthold von Eberstein, whose son Eberhard III resigned his right of patronage at the nearby Sturzelbronn abbey. Eberhard's daughter married Count Henri II of Zweibrücken-Bitsch.

A square tower survives from the time of the foundation of the church, but the nave is Gothic. In 1774 the church, which had fallen into ruin, was comprehensively restored.

Schorbach is also known for the Ossarium at the entrance of the old churchyard, which dates from either the 12th or 15th century, according to different sources.

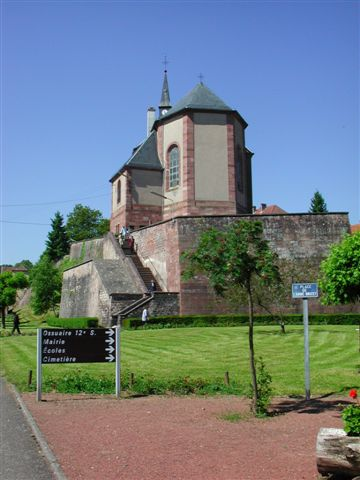
Church of Saint-Rémy

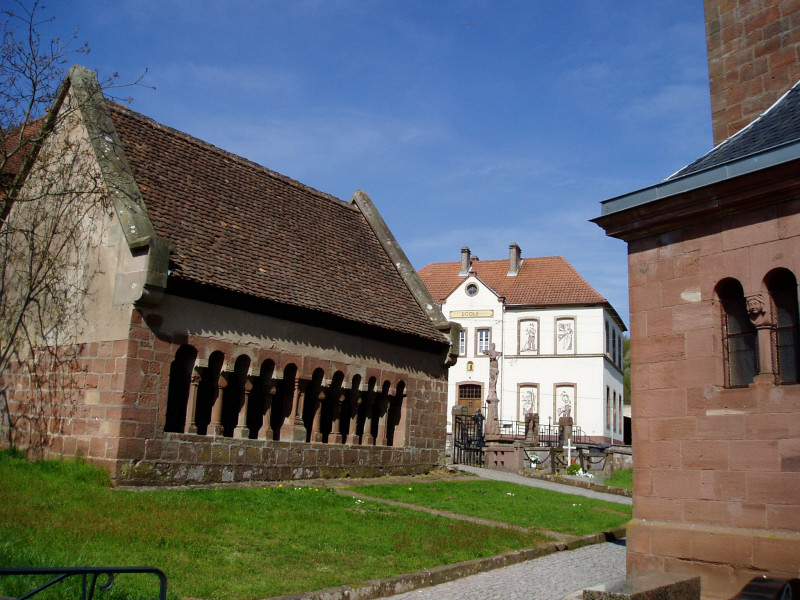
Roman Ossarium
