= Mazy =

Mazy Mazi (Walloon)
- Village
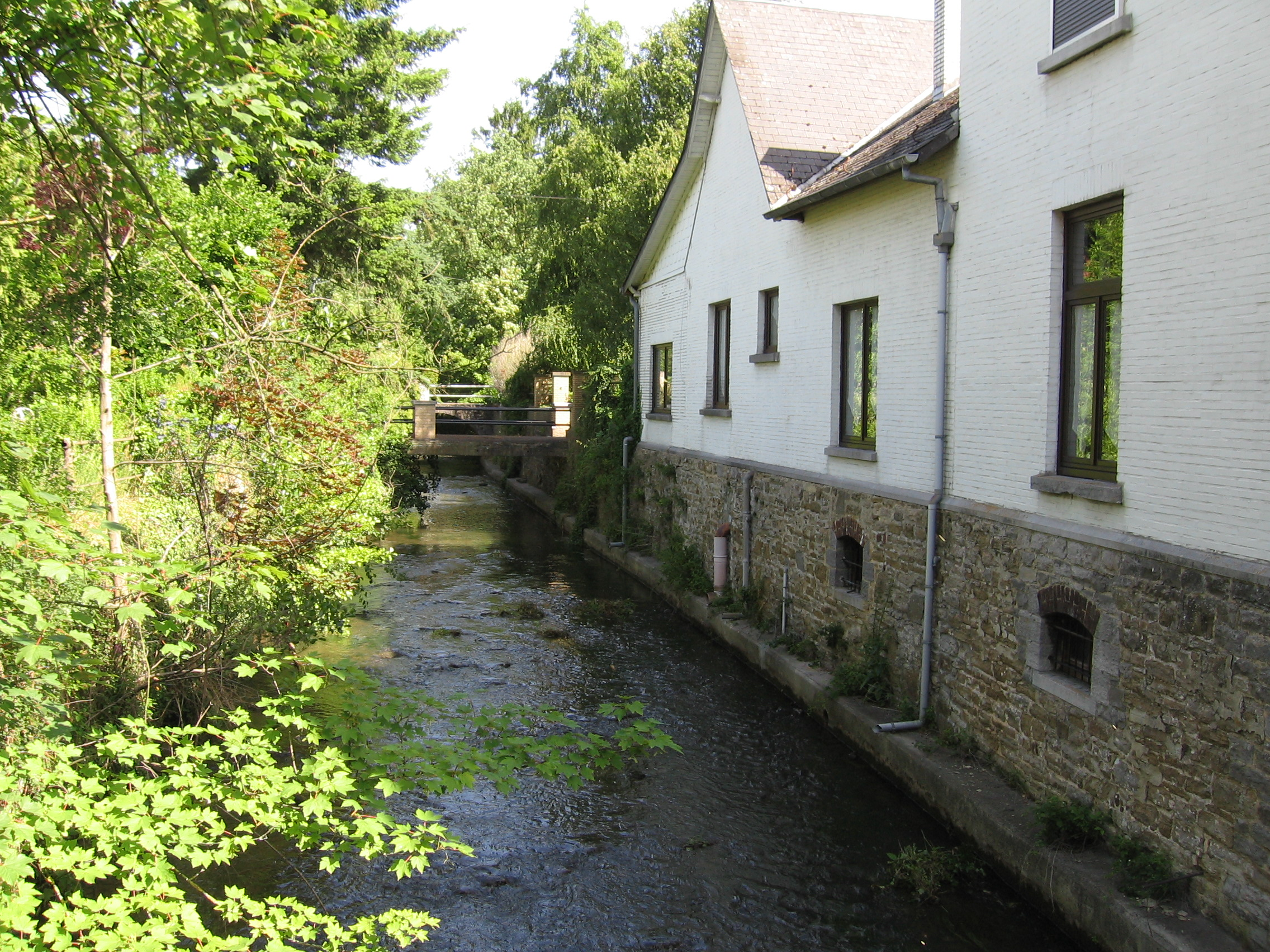
- The Orneau flowing through Mazy

- Location within Belgium
- Coordinates: 50°30′41.2″N 4°40′36.1″E
- Country: Belgium
- Region: Wallonia
- Province: Namur
- Municipality: Gembloux
- Elevation: 112 m (367 ft)
- Time zone: UTC+1 (CET)

Mazy (French pronunciation: [mazi]; Walloon: Mazi) is a village of Wallonia and a district of the municipality of Gembloux, located in the province of Namur, Belgium.

== Geography ==
Mazy is crossed by the Orneau (a tributary of the Sambre).

== Heritage ==
Falnuée Castle, currently a golf clubhouse, is located in Mazy.
