= Wagnelée =

Wagnelée Wagnlêye (Walloon)
- Village
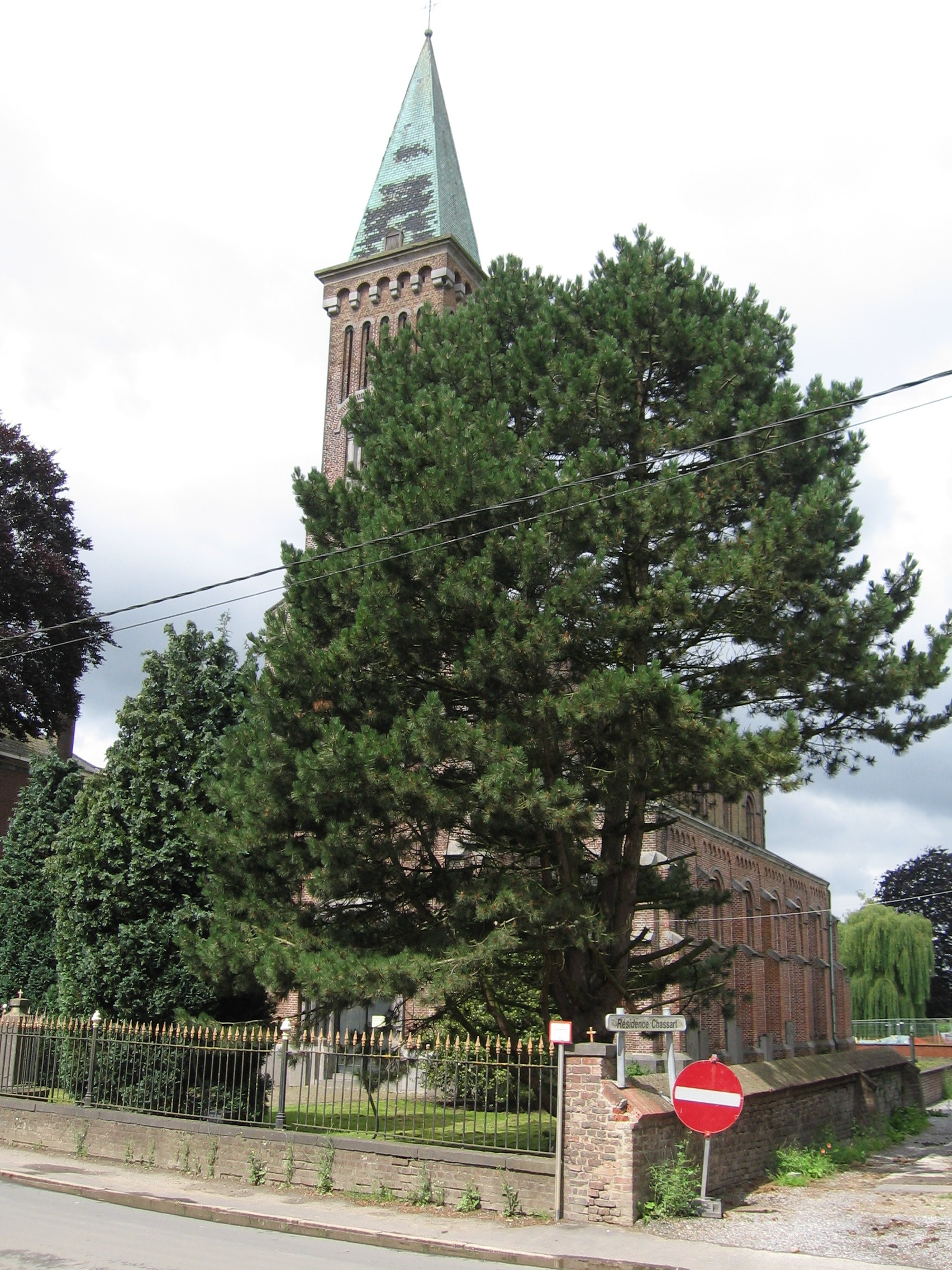
- The church of Sainte-Gertrude.

- Location within Belgium
- Coordinates: 50°31′23.23″N 4°31′58.87″E
- Country: Belgium
- Region: Wallonia
- Province: Hainaut
- Municipality: Fleurus
- Time zone: UTC+1 (CET)

Wagnelée (French pronunciation: [waɲle]; Walloon: Wagnlêye) is a village of Wallonia and a district of the municipality of Fleurus, located in the Arrondissement of Charleroi, province of Hainaut, Belgium.

The Wagnelée post code is 6223 and the telephone zone code is 071.

Wagnelée was its own municipality until the fusion of the Belgian municipalities in 1977 when it merged with Fleurus.

== History ==
In 1815 Wagnelée one of a string of villages that formed the front line between the Prussian army commanded by Gebhard von Blücher and the French Army of the North commanded by Napoleon Bonaparte at the Battle of Ligny. Wagnelée was on the extreme right flank of the Prussian line and was held by the Prussians throughout the battle.
