= Henri Parisot =

French general (1881–1963)

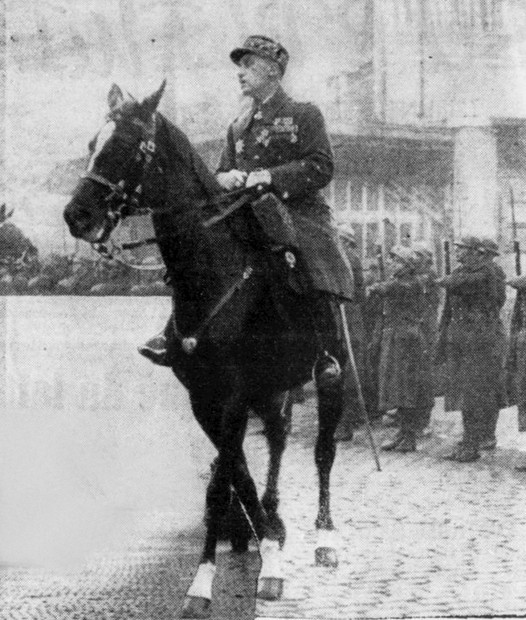
General Parisot in Dijon on November 11, 1938

Henri Parisot (1881–1963) was a French general during the First World War (1914–1918) and Second World War (1939–1945).

Parisot fought with the infantry during the First World War. In February 1918, he was appointed attaché to the Italian general headquarters. In April, he was moved to the newly established allied headquarters of Ferdinand Foch. He remained with the French headquarters in occupied Germany until December 1925. Following this, he was given command of a regiment until 17 June 1933, when he was sent to Rome as military attaché at the French embassy.

As attaché at Rome, Parisot advocated détente with Italy. This policy was at odds with that favoured by the Deuxième Bureau (the French intelligence agency). As a result, Parisot found his communications with the Bureau stymied. He was still attaché at Rome when Italy declared war on France on 10 June 1940. He was repatriated and then selected as one of the French delegates that formally negotiated and signed the armistice with Germany on 22 June and the armistice with Italy on 24 June.

After the armistice with Italy, Parisot was sent to Turin as deputy chief of the French delegation to the Italian Armistice Commission. He was valued because he had a good relationship with the Italian chief-of-staff, Marshal Pietro Badoglio, going back to their time at the allied headquarters under Foch in 1918.
