= Fleurus =

City in Hainaut Province, Wallonia, Belgium

Fleurus Fleuru (Walloon)
- Municipality
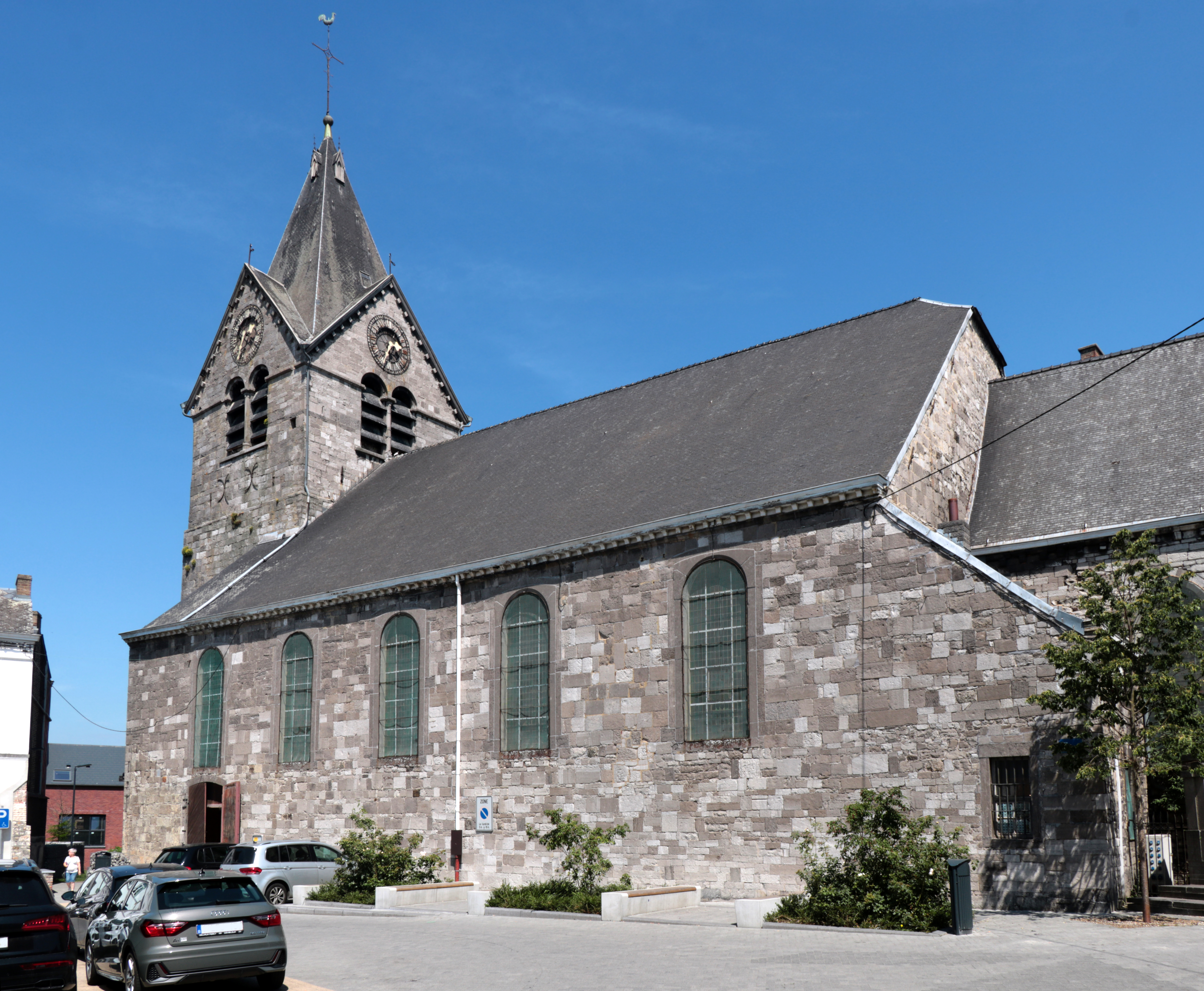

- Coat of arms

- Location of Fleurus in Hainaut
- Interactive map of Fleurus
- Location in Belgium
- Coordinates: 50°29′N 04°32′E
- Country: Belgium
- Community: French Community
- Region: Wallonia
- Province: Hainaut
- Arrondissement: Charleroi

Government
  - Mayor: Loïc D'Haeyer (PS)
  - Governing party: PS - DéFI

Area
  - Total: 59.48 km^{2} (22.97 sq mi)

Population (2018-01-01)
  - Total: 22,738
  - Density: 382.3/km^{2} (990.1/sq mi)
- Postal codes: 6220-6224
- NIS code: 52021
- Area codes: 071
- Website: www.fleurus.be

Fleurus (French pronunciation: [flœ.ʁys]; Walloon: Fleuru) is a municipality and city of Wallonia located in the province of Hainaut, Belgium. It has been the site of four major battles.

The municipality consists of the following districts: Brye, Heppignies, Fleurus, Lambusart, Saint-Amand, Wagnelée, Wanfercée-Baulet (wa: Wanfercêye-Bålet), and Wangenies.

== History ==
Traces of agriculture dating back to the Neolithic Age were found in area known as Fleurjoux and Neuve Baraque. Later the site saw the construction of the Chaussée Brunehaut, a road network of uncertain origin, perhaps attributable to the Roman Empire.

In October 1155, Henry IV of Luxembourg, also Count of Namur enfranchised the municipality which became the city of Fleurus. Henry IV had a castle in Heppignies.

The town has given its name to three battles fought in the area :

- The Battle of Fleurus (1622) in the Thirty Years' War.
- The Battle of Fleurus (1690) in the Nine Years' War.
- The Battle of Fleurus (1794) in the French Revolutionary Wars.

Two days before the Battle of Waterloo in 1815 Napoleon I defeated the Prussians in what is known as the Battle of Ligny, although the pivotal action took place just north of Fleurus.

The battles have been commemorated in ship names of the countries involved, which in turn has led to Fleurus Island in Antarctica being named after SS Fleurus, a Norwegian trawler operated between the Falkland Islands and the whaling station on South Georgia in the 1920s. The "Rue de Fleurus" is on the Left Bank in Paris.

In World War II, the only fighting near Fleurus was a tank battle southwest of the town at Vieux Campinaire in September 1944.

0.1 km^{2} (24.71 acres) was added to the municipality's area in the early 2000s.

== Economy ==
Children's publisher Proost is a major local employer. The Institut national des radioéléments produces radioactive isotopes for medical use.

== Historical population ==
Year	Population	Density	Area
January 2002	22,324 (10,626 males and 11,698 females)	377.22/km^{2}	59.18 km^{2}
January 2004	22,209 (10,619 males, 11,590 females)	374.64/km^{2}	59.28 km^{2}
