= Tongrinne =

Village in Namur Province, Belgium

Tongrinne Tongrene (Walloon)
- Village
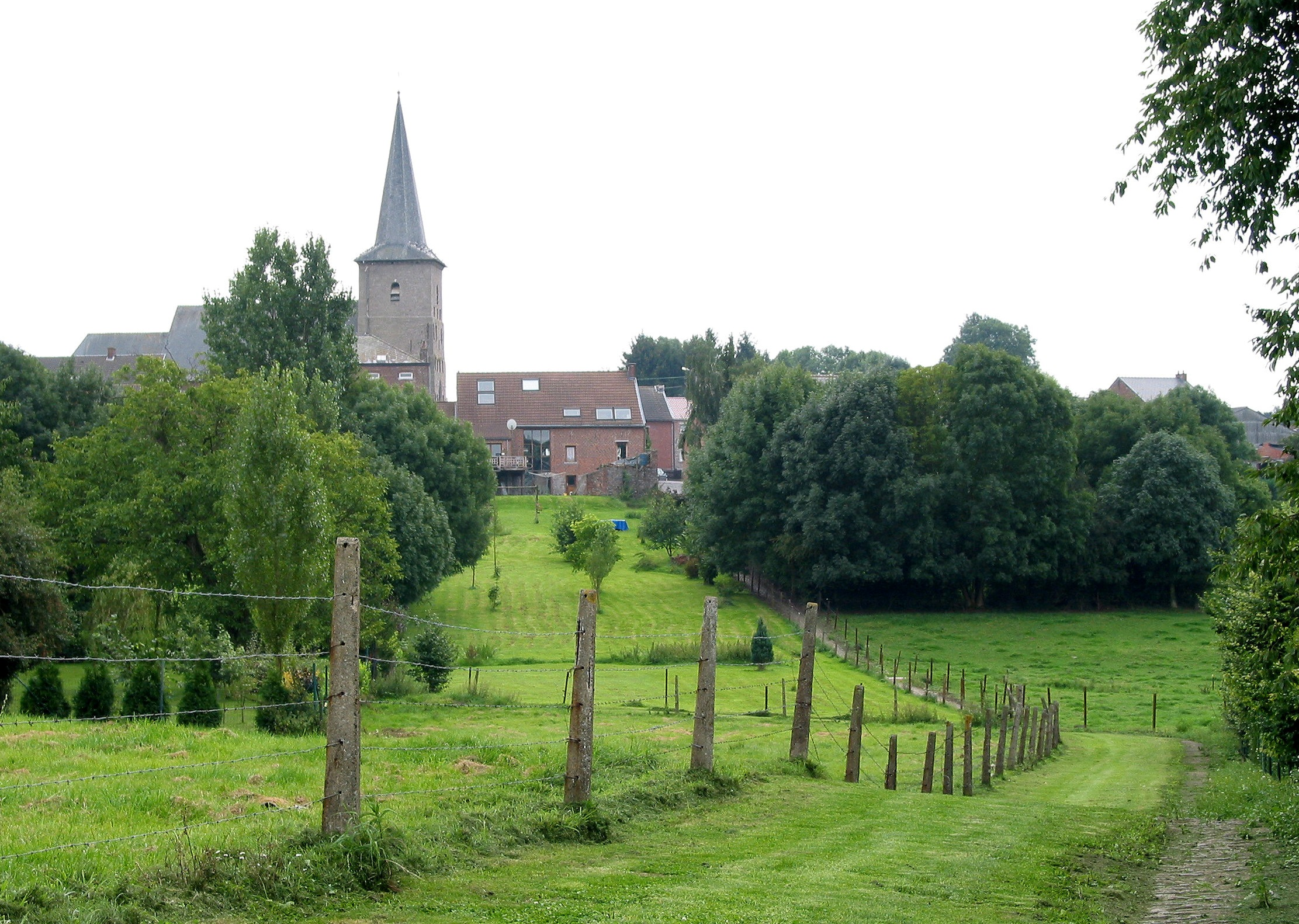

- Location within Belgium
- Coordinates: 50°30′56.68″N 4°37′26.18″E
- Country: Belgium
- Region: Wallonia
- Province: Namur
- Municipality: Sombreffe

Area
  - Total: 5.89 km^{2} (2.27 sq mi)
- Time zone: UTC+1 (CET)

Tongrinne (French pronunciation: [tɔ̃ɡʁin]; Walloon: Tongrene) is a village of Wallonia and a district of the municipality of Sombreffe, located in the province of Namur, Belgium.

Previously its own municipality, a 1977 fusion of the Belgian municipalities made it an ancienne commune of Sombreffe. Tongrinne is on the banks of the river Ligny.

== History ==
The village and the heights of Tongrene were the location for the left wing of Blücher's Prussian Army during the Battle of Ligny, on 16 June 1815. While the Prussians had held Tongrene, their main force was defeated at Ligny (Napoleon's last ever victory), while the forces of Wellington and Marshal Ney were engaging each other at the Battle of Quatre Bras. Because of the defeat at Ligny, the Prussians were forced to give up Tongrene during the night of the 16/17 June. Two days later, the combined forces of both opponents met at the Battle of Waterloo.
