= Sombreffe =

Municipality in Namur Province, Wallonia, Belgium

Sombreffe Sombrefe (Walloon)
- Municipality
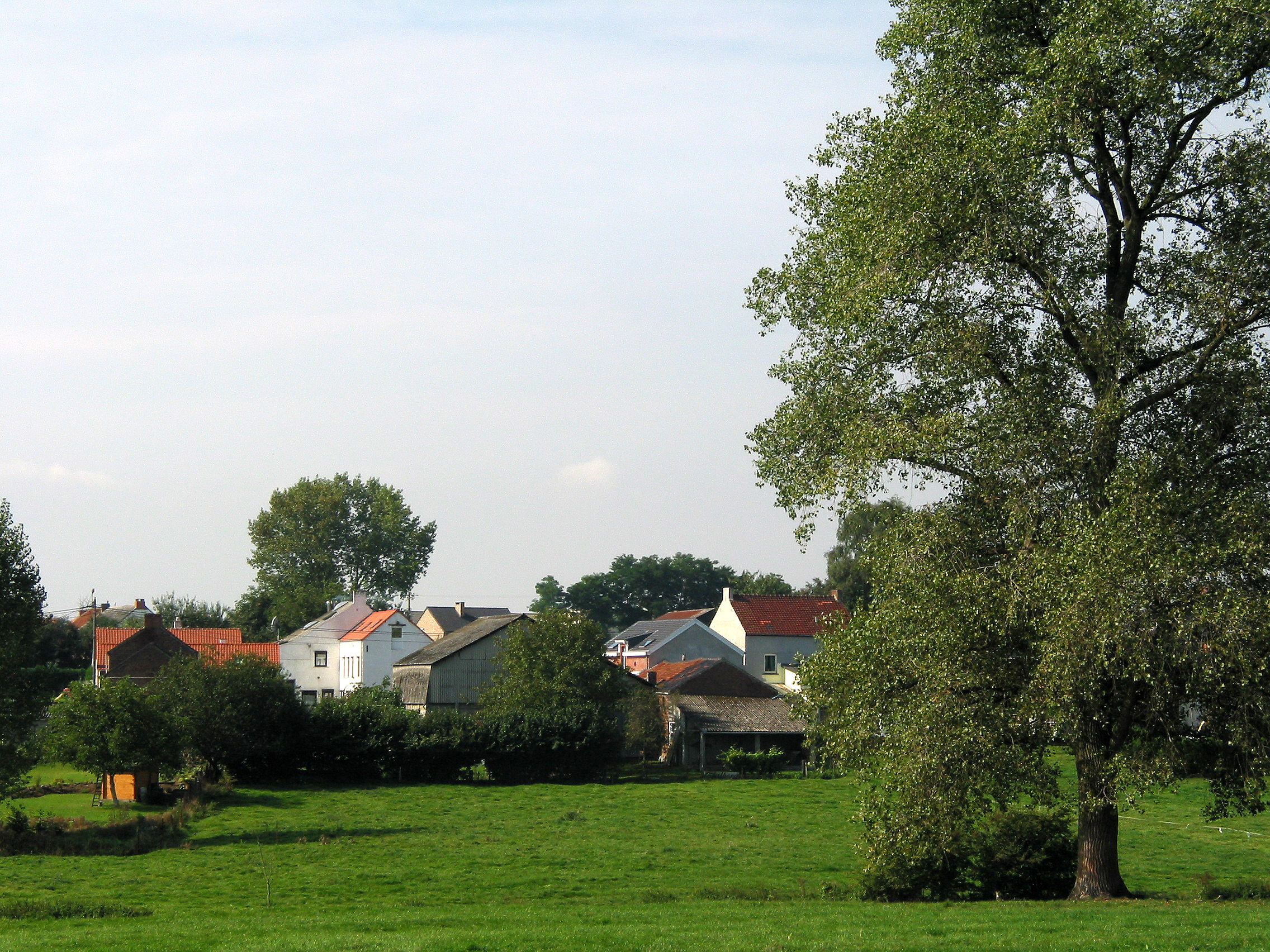

- Flag Coat of arms

- Location of Sombreffe in Namur Province
- Interactive map of Sombreffe
- Location in Belgium
- Coordinates: 50.53145°N 4.59700°E
- Country: Belgium
- Community: French Community
- Region: Wallonia
- Province: Namur
- Arrondissement: Namur

Government
  - Mayor: Jonathan Burtaux
  - Governing party: IC-MR

Area
  - Total: 35.89 km^{2} (13.86 sq mi)

Population (2018-01-01)
  - Total: 8,420
  - Density: 235/km^{2} (608/sq mi)
- Postal codes: 5140
- NIS code: 92114
- Area codes: 071
- Website: www.sombreffe.be

Sombreffe (French pronunciation: [sɔ̃bʁɛf]; Walloon: Sombrefe) is a municipality of Wallonia located in the province of Namur, Belgium.

On 1 January 2014 the municipality had 8,226 inhabitants. The total area is 35.78 km^{2}, giving a population density of 230 inhabitants per km^{2}.

The municipality is composed of the following districts: Boignée, Ligny, Sombreffe and Tongrinne.

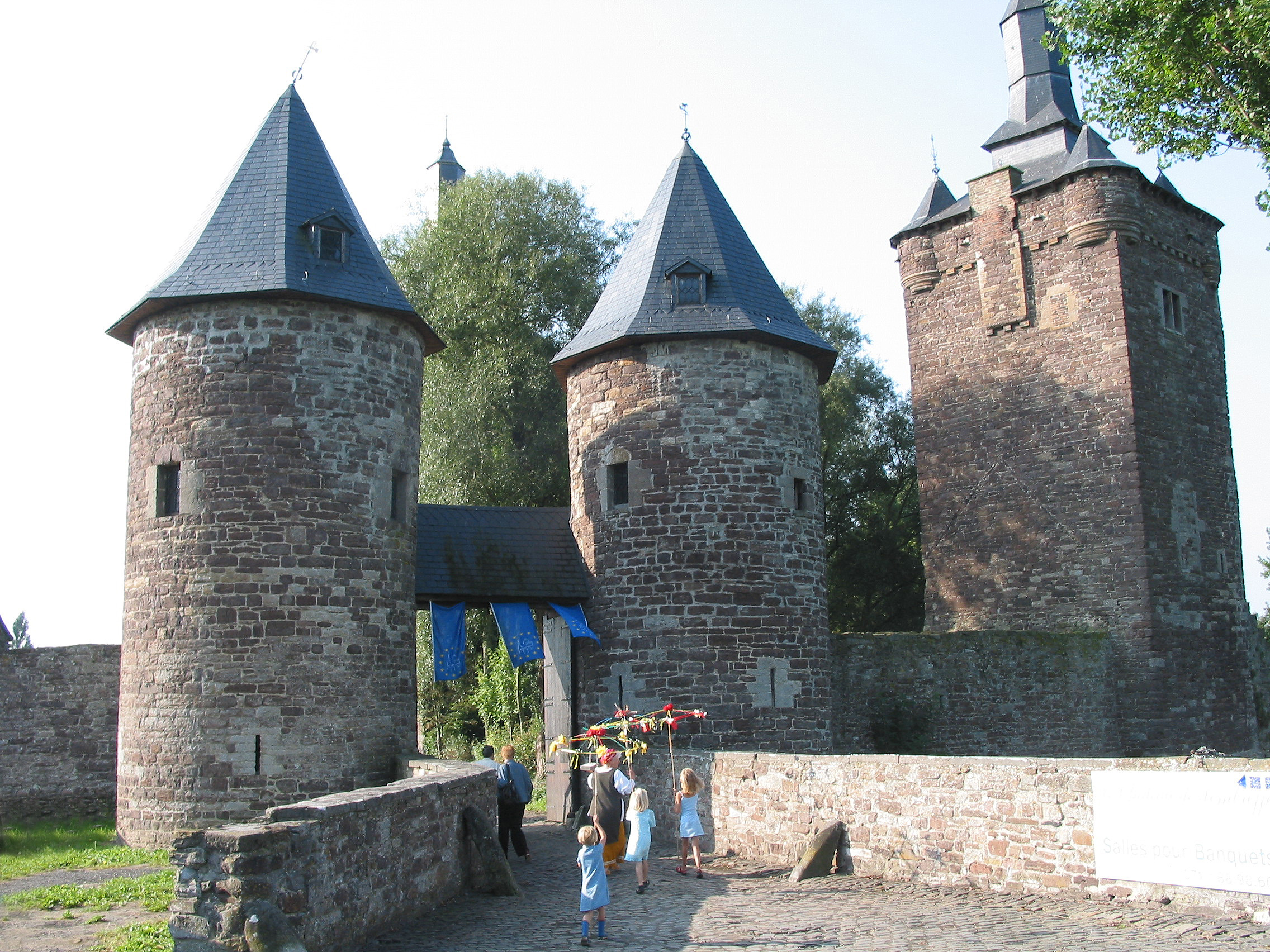
Sombreffe Castle

== See also ==
- List of protected heritage sites in Sombreffe
