= Ligny =

Village in Namur Province, Belgium

Ligny Lignè (Walloon)
- Village
- Ligny Station

- Location within Belgium
- Coordinates: 50°30′43″N 4°34′29″E
- Country: Belgium
- Region: Wallonia
- Province: Namur
- Municipality: Sombreffe

Area
  - Total: 5.89 km^{2} (2.27 sq mi)
- Time zone: UTC+1 (CET)

Ligny (French pronunciation: [liɲi]; Walloon: Lignè) is a village of Wallonia and a district of the municipality of Sombreffe, located in the province of Namur, Belgium.

Previously its own municipality, a 1977 fusion of the Belgian municipalities made it an ancienne commune of Sombreffe.

== History ==
It is known as the site of the 1815 Battle of Ligny, where Napoleon achieved his last ever victory, defeating Blücher, while the forces of Wellington and Marshal Ney were engaging each other at the Battle of Quatre Bras. Two days later, the combined forces of both opponents met at the Battle of Waterloo.
