= 2nd Light Cavalry Lancers Regiment of the Imperial Guard (Dutch) =

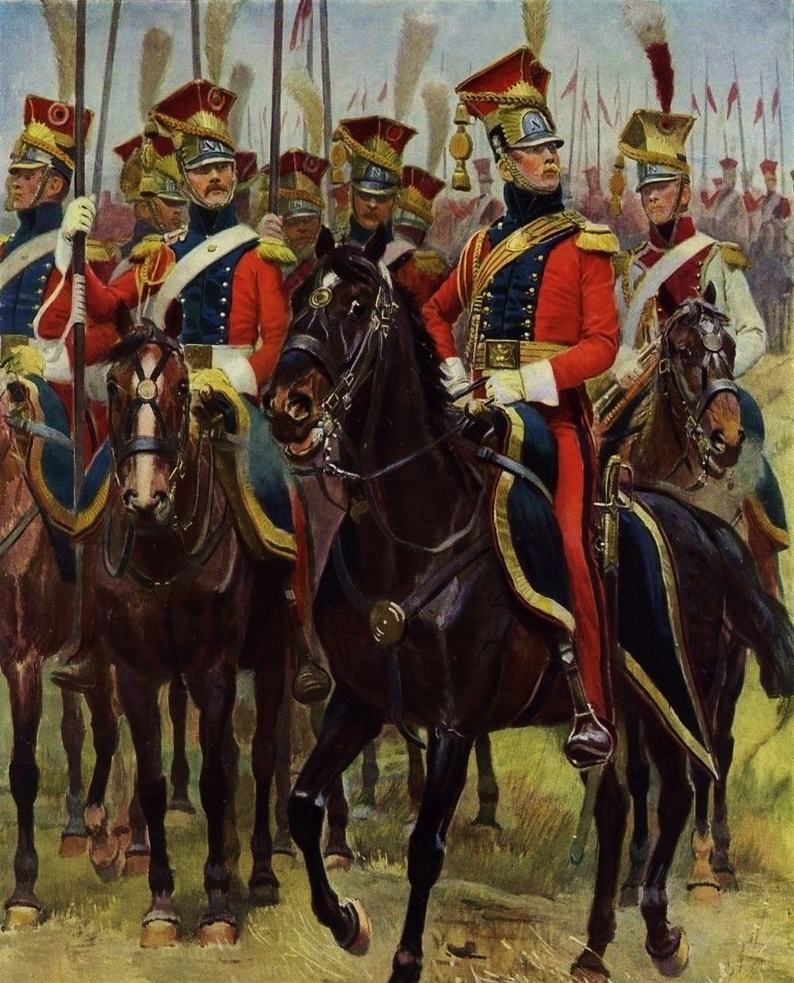
- Officer, trumpeter and troopers of the regiment
- Active: 1810–1815
- Allegiance: First French Empire
- Branch: Imperial Guard
- Type: Light cavalry
- Size: Regiment
- Nicknames: Red Lancers ("Lanciers rouges"); Dutch Lancers ("Lanciers hollandais"); Crawfishes ("Écrevisses")

Commanders
- Notable commanders: Pierre David de Colbert-Chabanais

The 2nd Light Cavalry Lancers Regiment of the Imperial Guard (French: 2e régiment de chevau-légers lanciers de la Garde Impériale) was a light cavalry regiment of the French Imperial Army's Imperial Guard. Initially intended to serve as hussars in the Dutch royal guard, the regiment was raised in 1810 after the First French Empire annexed the Kingdom of Holland. It was known throughout the French army for its loyalty and military abilities, as well as its professionalism on and off the battlefield.

== Origin ==
At the time of its annexation by France in 1810, the Royal Guard of the Kingdom of Holland contained a battalion of grenadiers and a regiment of horse guards that combined squadrons of cuirassiers and hussars. Napoleon decreed that these men would transfer to the Imperial Guard, with the infantry becoming the 3rd Foot Grenadier Regiment of the Imperial Guard and the cavalry retraining to become a new regiment of lancers modelled on the existing 1st Polish Light Cavalry Regiment of the Imperial Guard. They were given a new scarlet uniform (copied, except the colour, from the Polish lancers uniform). They also received a new leader - Col. Baron Pierre David de Colbert-Chabanais - under whom they were known formally as the 2nd Light Horse Lancers of the Imperial Guard (2^{e} régiment de chevaux-légers des Lanciers de la Garde Impériale).

== Campaigns ==
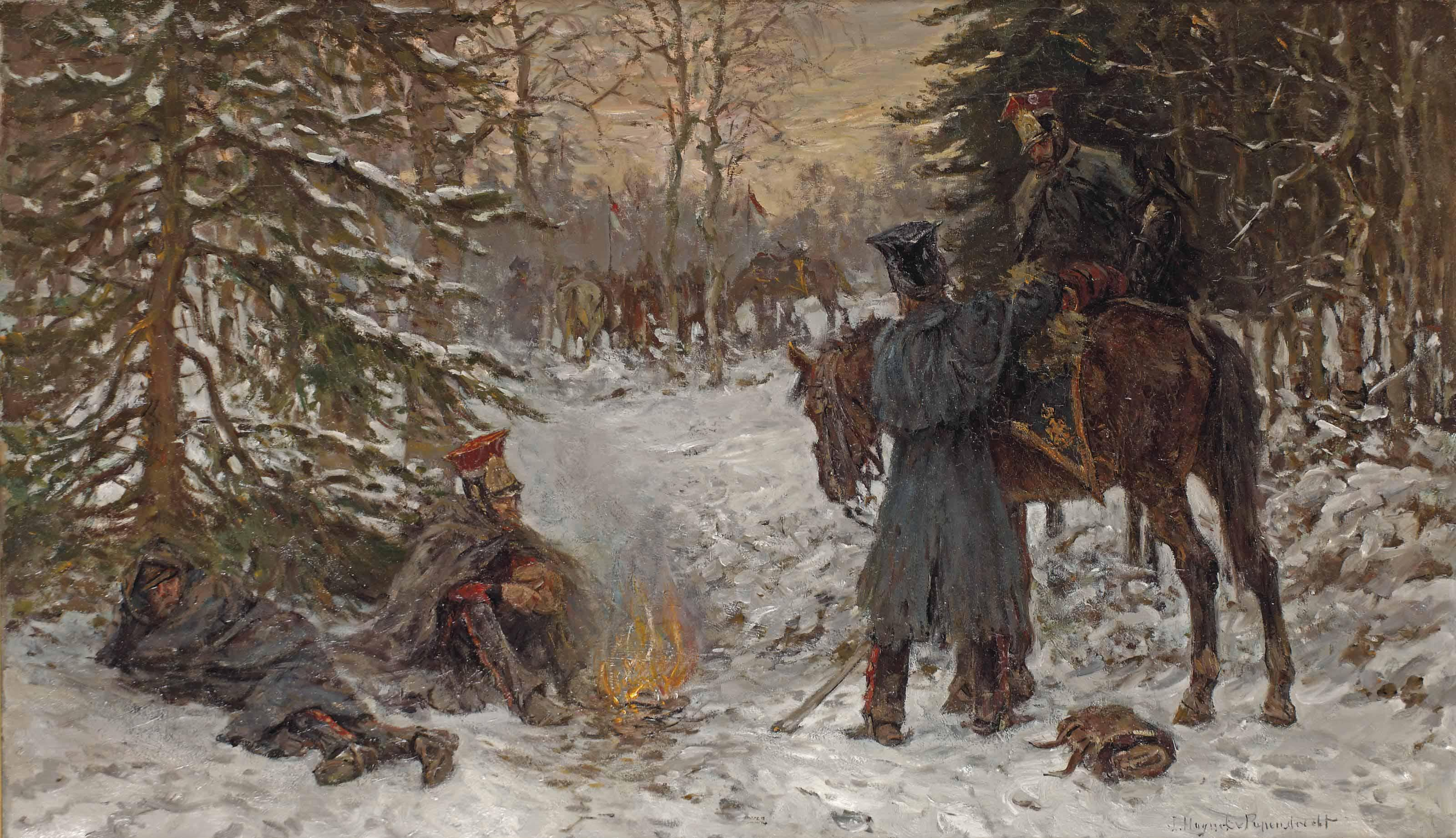
The regiment during the French invasion of Russia in 1812

Despite their previous posts in the Netherlands as the Royal Guards, they suffered enormous losses in the first invasion they participated in, which was that of Russia in 1812. While the devastation for the regiment at that particular conflict almost caused the entire dissolution of the newly formed unit, they would continue to serve in the military, but without many of the original Dutchmen, who were thought of as the pride of the regiment and who would be replaced by French soldiers.

The following year, in 1813, the Red Lancers were a distinguished regiment in a battle in Germany, and once again, in 1814, where they fought in the areas then known as the Low Countries. The next year after that, in 1815, Napoleon returned from his exile. The same year, the Red Lancers fought at Waterloo. Even though Dutch-Belgian cavalry commander Jean Baptiste van Merlen, one of the most highly ranked and celebrated army officers of the regiment, lost his life at Waterloo, some of the original Dutchmen still existed in the ranks, and would serve as Red Lancers long after the French defeat there.

== Uniform ==
The Chevau-Léger Lanciers wore a red coat with blue lapels, cuffs and turnbacks. They wore a red piped yellow Polish shako. They had yellow aiguillettes and epaulettes. The trumpeters wore a white coat with red lapels, cuffs and turnbacks. They wore a white Polish shako and rode grey horses.

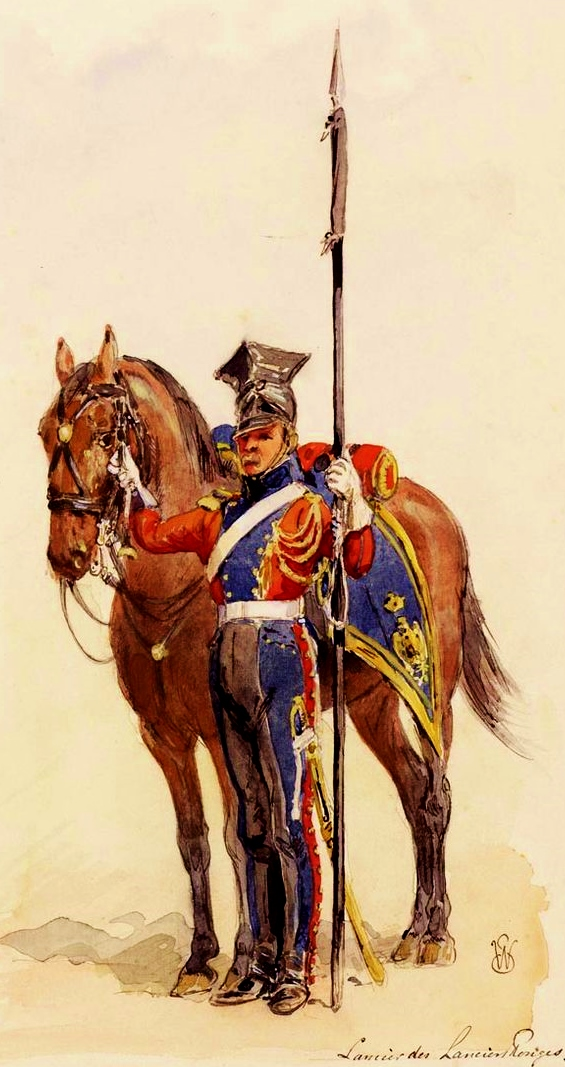
Lancer in campaign dress

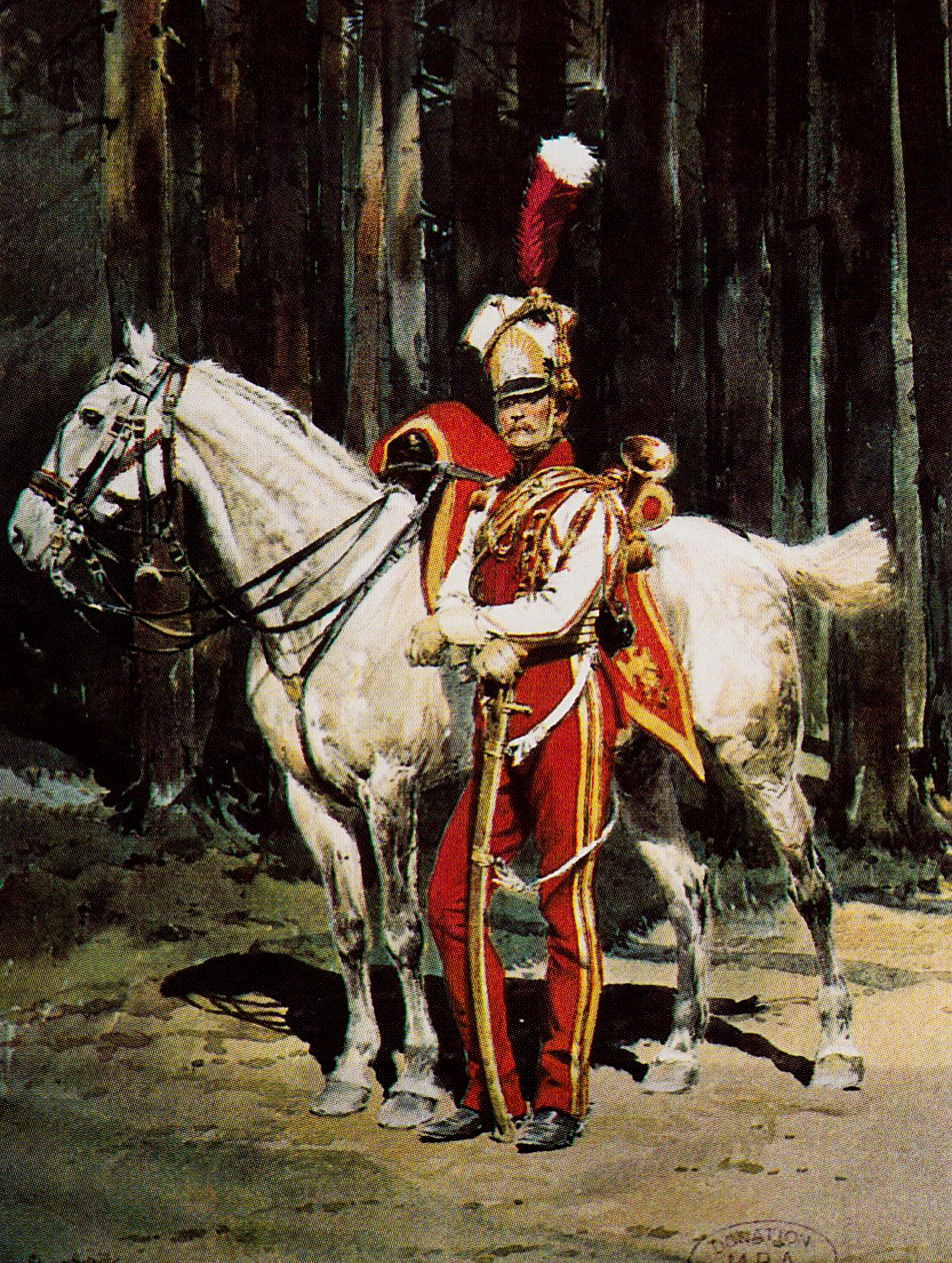
Trumpeter in full dress
