= Jean Baptiste van Merlen =

Dutch army officer (1772–1815)

Jean Baptiste van Merlen Baron de l'Empire
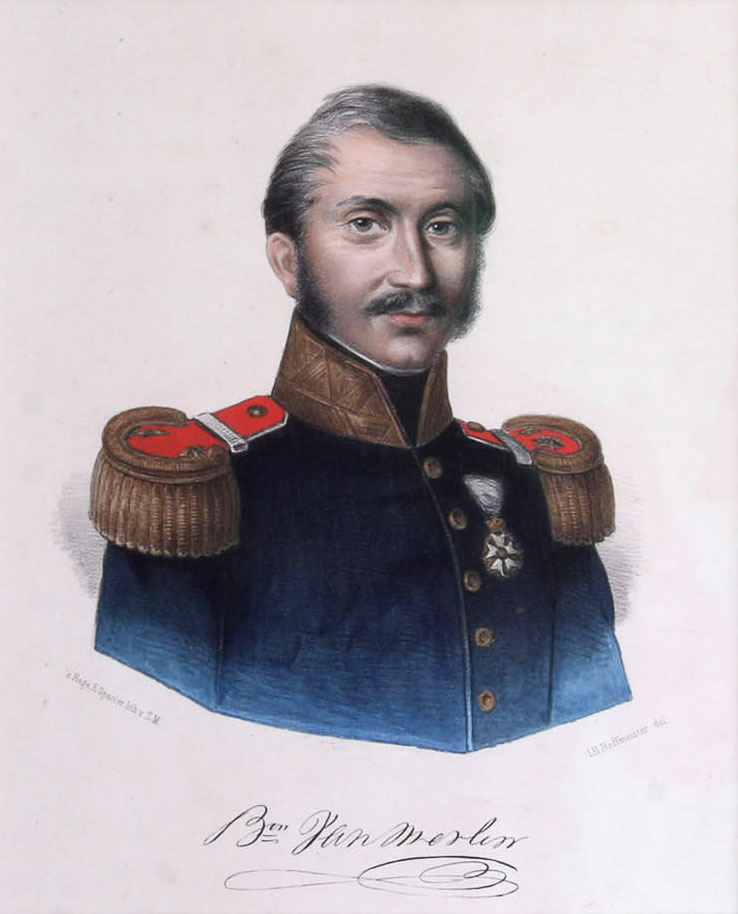
- Born: 15 April 1773; Antwerp, Austrian Netherlands
- Died: 18 June 1815 (aged 42) Waterloo
- Buried: Church of Saint Joseph, Waterloo
- Allegiance: United Belgian States (France) French Republic; Batavian Republic; Kingdom of Holland (France) French Empire; United Kingdom of the Netherlands
- Branch: Cavalry
- Service years: 1788–1815
- Conflicts: French Revolutionary Wars; Napoleonic Wars
- Awards: Knight of the Order of the Union; Knight of the Order of the Reunion; Officer of the Legion of Honour

Major General Jean Baptiste Baron van Merlen (11 May 1772 – 18 June 1815) (also spelt Joannes Baptista Baron van Merlen) was an army officer born in the Austrian Netherlands who, following the varied fortunes of his homeland, fought on both sides during the French Revolutionary and Napoleonic Wars. Fighting in a series of campaigns in the Netherlands, Germany and Spain, he played an important part in the battles of Quatre Bras and Waterloo, where he was killed in action.

== Early life and French Service ==
Merlen was born in Antwerp on 11 May 1772, fifth of the thirteen children of merchant Bernardus Josephus Antonius van Merlen and his wife Isabelle Caroline Ligeois. At age fifteen, he travelled to Brussels and became volunteer in the service of the state of Brabant on 17 March 1788. During the Brabant Revolution a year later, he fought at Turnhout and the capture of Diest, and was promoted to 2nd Lieutenant on 21 March 1790.

When Austria succeeded in suppressing the rebellion, Van Merlen was one of those who fled to France, settling in Douai in December 1790. On 15 July 1792, he was appointed 2nd Lieutenant in the Belgian Legion, part of the Army of the North under Charles François Dumouriez. He fought at Jemappes and Neerwinden, becoming a 1st Lieutenant on 13 March 1793 and Captain on 11 August the same year. At the battle of Lincelles, two of his ribs were crushed by a rifle bullet. The following year, he became adjutant to Jean-Baptiste Dumonceau, and took part in the battle of Tourcoing.

== Dutch service ==
On the formation of the Batavian Republic in 1795, Van Merlen transferred to the army of the new nation. He also moved from the infantry to the cavalry, though this necessitated a drop in rank, becoming a 1st Lieutenant in the Batavian Hussars on 10 July 1795. On 4 April 1798 he was promoted to Ritmeester, a rank equivalent to captain. The following year, his regiment helped defeat the Anglo-Russian invasion of Holland, with Van Merlen fighting at Bergen, Alkmaar and Castricum. In 1800 he was campaigning along the Main, distinguishing himself at the battle of Oberschwach and the siege of Würzburg. In 1805, Van Merlen's regiment formed part of Auguste de Marmont's II Corps, and played a part in the Ulm campaign.

When the Batavian Republic became the Kingdom of Holland in 1806, Van Merlen found favour with King Louis and was made a Lieutenant Colonel in the Royal Guard Hussars on 23 October 1806. Three days later he was marching with the Dutch army into Germany to support French forces in the war with Prussia. He saw service near Ertzen on 7 November 1806 and drove the Prussian vanguard into Hamelin. However, a dispute arose between Louis and his brother Napoleon which resulted in the Royal Guard being returned to The Hague without seeing further action.

Van Merlen was promoted to Major on 6 April 1807, and to Colonel on 5 March 1808. He was placed in command of the newly formed Gardes te Paard (Horse Guards) Regiment, which consisted of hussars and cuirassiers. However, he seems to have offended King Louis and had to leave the court, becoming colonel of the 3rd Hussars who were already serving in the Dutch Brigade and fighting in the Peninsular War. He joined his new regiment in Spain and led it in the battles of Talavera, Arzobispo, Almonacid and Ocaña. By this time casualties had reached such a level that Colonel van Merlen sent two squadrons of sick and disabled back to Holland in June 1810, retaining just a single squadron under his command in Spain.

== French empire ==
When the Kingdom of Holland was annexed by France in July 1810, Van Merlen found himself once more in French service. On 11 November 1810 he was transferred to the 2nd Regiment of Lancers in the French Imperial Guard, the "Red Lancers", which was formed mainly for former members of the Dutch Royal Guard. He remained serving in Spain, and it was not until 11 March 1812 that his remaining hussars formally became the fifth squadron of the Red Lancers, with him as their colonel. When the Lancers departed to take part in the French invasion of Russia, Van Merlen remained at Versailles in command of the regimental depot. Here, he played a part in suppressing the Malet coup of 1812.

Following Napoleon's return from Russia, Van Merlen was promoted to Général de Brigade on 12 January 1813, and on 1 March 1813 given command of a light cavalry brigade in the army forming for the new campaign in Saxony. At the Battle of Lützen on 2 May 1813, Merlen commanded the 1st Brigade in the 3rd Light Cavalry Division under Louis Pierre Aimé Chastel. The division belonged to the I Cavalry Corps led by Victor de Fay de La Tour-Maubourg. The brigade counted only 22 officers and 520 men and included elements of the 6th, 8th, 25th and Portuguese Legion Chasseurs à Cheval and the 6th Hussars. He went on to fight at Bautzen, Dresden and at Leipzig where two horses were shot under him. At Hanau, Van Merlen's charge at the head of his brigade helped clear the road back to France.

For the Campaign in north-east France in 1814, Van Merlen's brigade was placed in Marmont's VI Corps. He fought at the battle of Brienne, but two days later he was captured in a cavalry skirmish between Montierender and Wassy taking three lance thrusts to his right arm and hand. When released at the end of the war, he learned that Napoleon had made him a Baron de l'empire on 5 April 1814, one day before his abdication. General Van Merlen resigned from the French army on 26 June 1814.

== The hundred days ==
On 1 September 1814, Van Merlen joined the army of the new United Kingdom of the Netherlands as a Major General, King William having decided that his new army needed experienced officers, even if they had recently fought under Napoleon. When Napoleon returned from Elba in 1815, Van Merlen remained loyal to his new master and, like many other Dutch and Belgian officers, prepared to go into battle against an army in which he had served all his life. His younger brother made the opposite choice and would fight for the French in Reille's II Corps.

Van Merlen was given command of the 2nd Dutch Light Cavalry brigade. During the opening days of the Waterloo campaign they had the vital task of monitoring the road from Mons to Brussels. The brigade was heavily engaged at Quatre Bras, and held in reserve at Waterloo, where they helped drive off the French cavalry attack. Late in the day, he was seriously wounded by a cannonball and died two hours later.

General Van Merlen was buried at the Church of Saint Joseph, Waterloo. A street in The Hague, Van Merlenstraat, is named after him.

== Marriage and family ==
Van Merlen married Reina Gesina Star Lichtenvoort (1768–1841) in Groningen in June 1799. The couple had one child:

- Bernard van Merlen (1800–1890) who also fought at Waterloo, and went on to become a Major General.
