= Roger Foulon =

Belgian writer

- Born: 3 August 1923; Thuin, Belgium
- Died: 23 February 2008 (aged 84); Thuin, Belgium
- Occupation: writer

Roger Foulon (3 August 1923 – 23 February 2008) was a Belgian writer in French.

He was the author of more than 120 works. He was the president of the Association of Belgian Writers in the French Language, from 1973 to 1994. From 1999 until his death he was a member of Académie royale de langue et de littérature françaises de Belgique. He was born and died in Thuin.

== Works ==
- L'espérance abolie, 1976.
- Un été dans la Fagne, Brussels, 1980. Prix George Garnir.
- Vipères, Brussels, 1981.
- Barrages, Brussels, 1982.
- Déluge, Brussels, 1984.
- Naissance du monde, 1986.
- Les tridents de la colère, 1991.
- L'homme à la tête étoilée, 1995.

== Awards ==
- Prix George Garnir, 1980.
