= Houtain-le-Val Castle =

Castle in Wallonia

Coordinates: 50.581°N 4.415°E

- Belgium
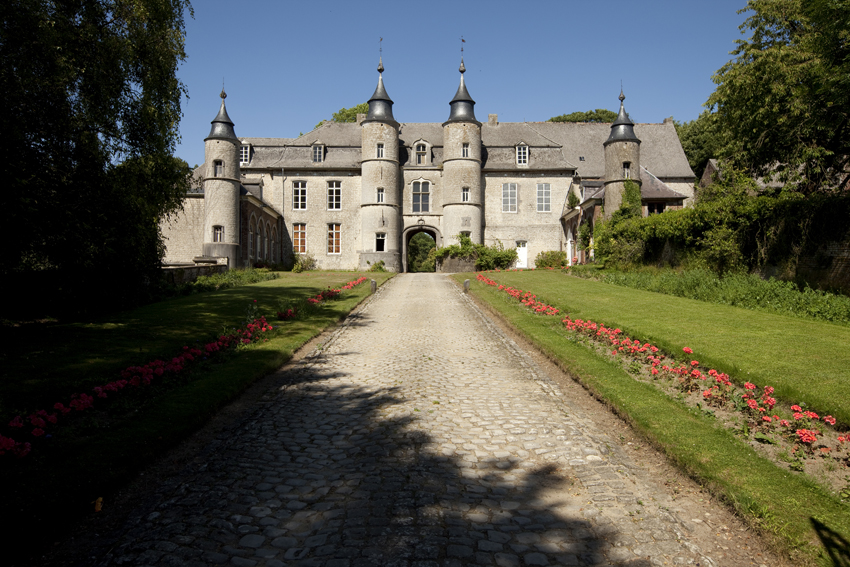

Site information
- Type: Castle

Houtain-le-Val Castle (French: Château de Houtain-le-Val) is a château in Houtain-le-Val, Wallonia, in the municipality of Genappe, Walloon Brabant, Belgium.

== History ==
The first castle on the site is believed to have been built by Walter de Holton, first lord of Houtain, in 1129. When it was restored in 1850, two small towers were added. The present owners are the descendants of the Comte de Moerkerke

== See also ==
- List of castles in Belgium
