= 3rd Foot Grenadier Regiment of the Imperial Guard =

"Les Grenadiers Hollandais" (The Dutch Grenadiers) 2e Régiment de Grenadiers-à-Pied de la Garde Impériale 3e Régiment de Grenadiers-à-Pied de la Garde Impériale
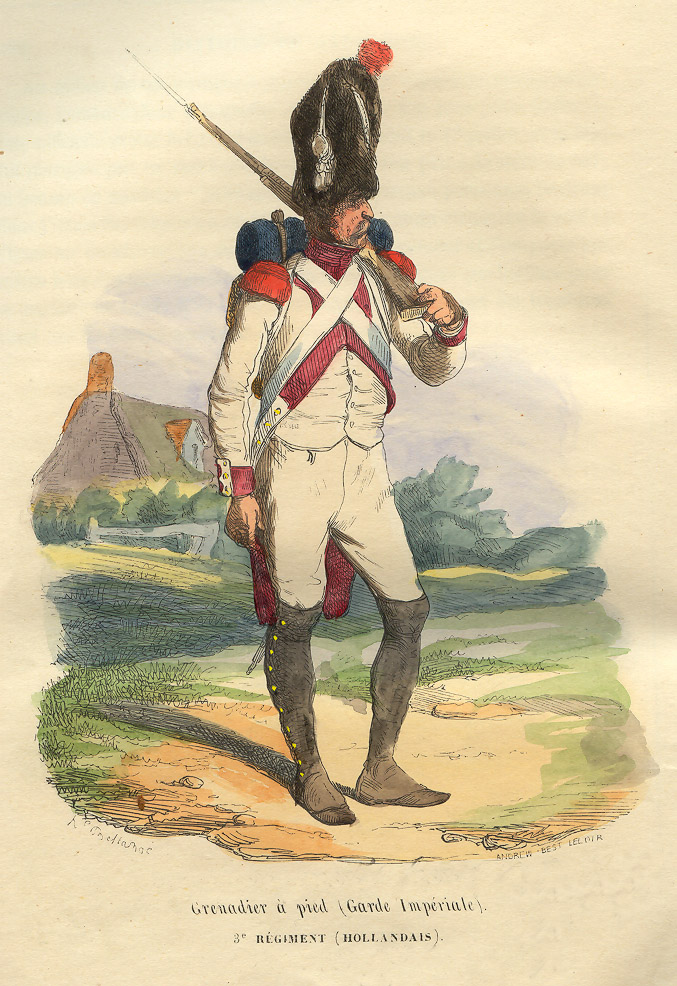
- Uniform of the regiment.
- Active: 1810–1813, 1815
- Country: First French Empire
- Branch: French Army
- Type: Grenadier; Imperial guard
- Role: Bayonet charge Bodyguard; Close combat Direct fire Frontal assault Infantry square Line warfare Raiding; Siege; Vanguard
- Size: Regiment
- Part of: Imperial Guard
- Engagements: Napoleonic Wars: Battle of Smolensk; Battle of Krasnoi

The Dutch Grenadiers were a French Grenadier Imperial Guard Regiment during the Napoleonic Wars. They were originally formed out of Louis Bonaparte's royal guard in the Kingdom of Holland.

== Early history ==
Originally, the unit had been raised as Grenadiers of the Royal Guard of Holland in 1806 when Louis Napoleon, brother of Napoleon Bonaparte, was made King of Holland. On July 9, 1810, after the Kingdom of Holland was annexed by the French Empire, the Dutch Grenadiers were incorporated into the French Imperial Guard. Initially numbered 2nd Foot Grenadiers Regiment of the Imperial Guard (2ème Régiment de grenadiers à pied de la Garde impériale), they were part of the Middle Guard. Still dressed in their Dutch white uniforms they marched to Paris where they served for over one and a half years as palace guard. In 1811, when the guard was expanded, the Dutch Grenadiers were renumbered and became the 3rd Foot Grenadiers Regiment.

== Uniforms ==
When the Dutch Grenadiers were added to the Imperial Guard they had worn their original Dutch royal guard uniforms. They were among the few units to use white uniforms in the French Army after the French Revolution. Afterwards the white main colour was kept though numerous adjustments were made. Cuffs, collar and lapels were crimson. The bowl buttons with the Dutch lion on them changed into flat ones with an imperial eagle. The pouch with the standing Dutch lion was changed into one with the imperial eagle as well. The bearskin caps differed with those from the 1st and 2nd Grenadiers of the guard. Those had 45 cm tall bearskins and were thinner while the 3rd had wider 40 cm tall bearskins. Also the Dutch bearskins did not feature the copper plate with a N and an eagle like the others; instead having no plate at all.

== Russian campaign ==
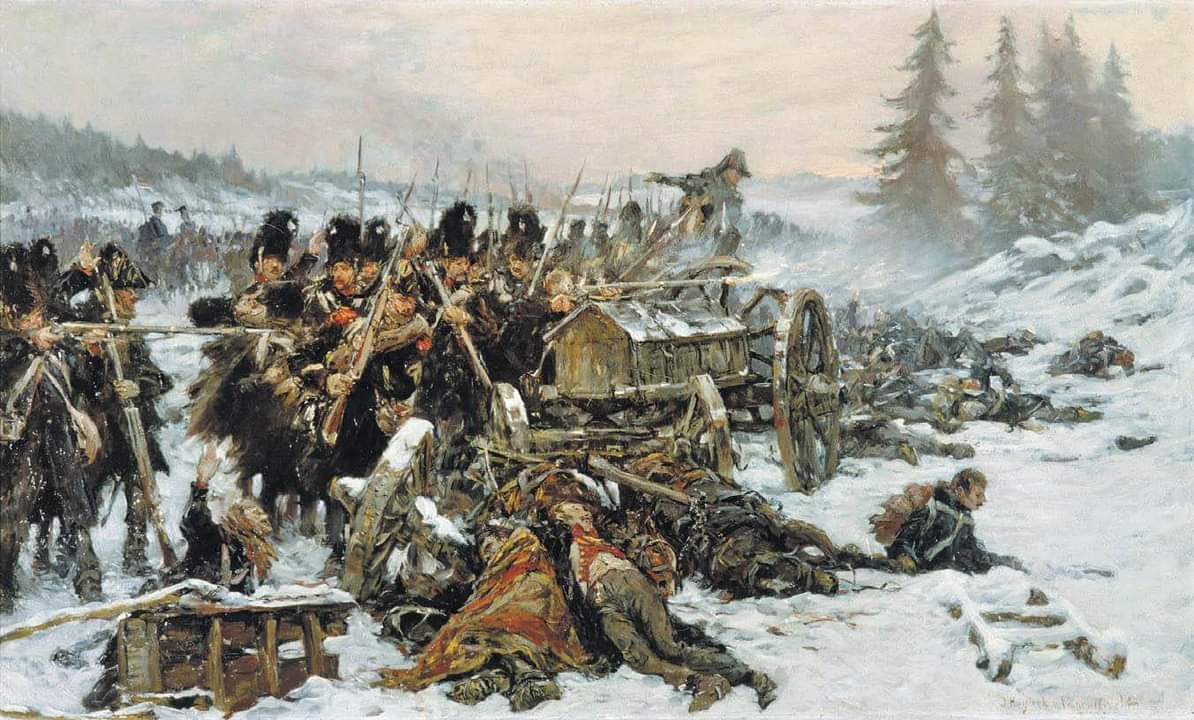
The Last Fight of the Dutch 3rd Regiment Grenadiers of the Guard, by Jan Hoynck van Papendrecht

On August 16, 1812, the Grande Armée arrived at Smolensk, the town being defended by 120,000 Russian troops. By 1 in the morning of August 17 Smolensk was in French hands. The stench of the quickly decaying corpses prevented the Guard from enjoying the pleasures of victory in the town. On the 19th a Russian general, found hiding in the town, refused to surrender and was bayoneted by the Grenadiers. On the 24th, the army began to quit Smolensk, for the Russians were withdrawing to defend Moscow. The Regiment survived Borodino intact, like the rest of the Guard infantry who saw no action even after repeated requests that the Guard would tip the battle in Napoleon’s favour rather than a long drawn-out stalemate.

A second line of (Dutch) grenadiers, which had been advancing to support the voltigeurs, then fell back under heavy Russian cannon fire. The grenadiers were driven from a critical defensive position with massive casualties. Roguet attempted to support the Dutch by attacking the Russian artillery batteries, but this offensive was broken up by Russian grapeshot and cavalry charges. Only 25 soldiers and eleven officers of the Grenadiers survived this encounter. The loss of this regiment ended the battle of Krasnoye. After Krasnoi the 3rd only had 36 men left and only 7 returned after the campaign.
