= Maladrie =

Coordinates: 50.3327°N 4.27933°E

Maladrie is a hamlet of Wallonia in the municipality and district of Thuin, located in the province of Hainaut, Belgium

The hamlet is about 1 mile (1.6 km) south-southwest of Thuin.

At 04:30 15 June 1815 four French cannons fired upon an outpost of the Prussian I Corps in Maladrie. This cannonade, announced the opening of the Waterloo Campaign by the French. It was heard at Charleroi; and General Zieten the commander of the Prussian I Corps, who, by the reports which he forwarded on 14 June to Prince Blücher and the Duke of Wellington, had fully prepared these commanders to expect an attack, lost no time in communicating to them the important fact, that hostilities had actually commenced.
