= Ludwig Albrecht von Rohr =

Prussian officer

Major Ludwig Albrecht von Rohr (1796–1815) was a Prussian officer during the Napoleonic Wars who was killed during the Waterloo Campaign.

== Biography ==
Ludwig Albrecht von Rohr, born on 12 January 1796, was the son of Albrecht Friedrich Christoph Moritz von Rohr (1758–1802) and Ernestine Sophie Loriol d'Anières (1758–1829).

Rohr was killed during the Battle of Ligny on the afternoon of 16 June near the village of Saint-Amand-la-Haye while commanding the 1st battalion of the 6th regiment of infantry (West-Prussian nr.1)
