= Pironchamps =

Coordinates: 50°25′N 4°31′E

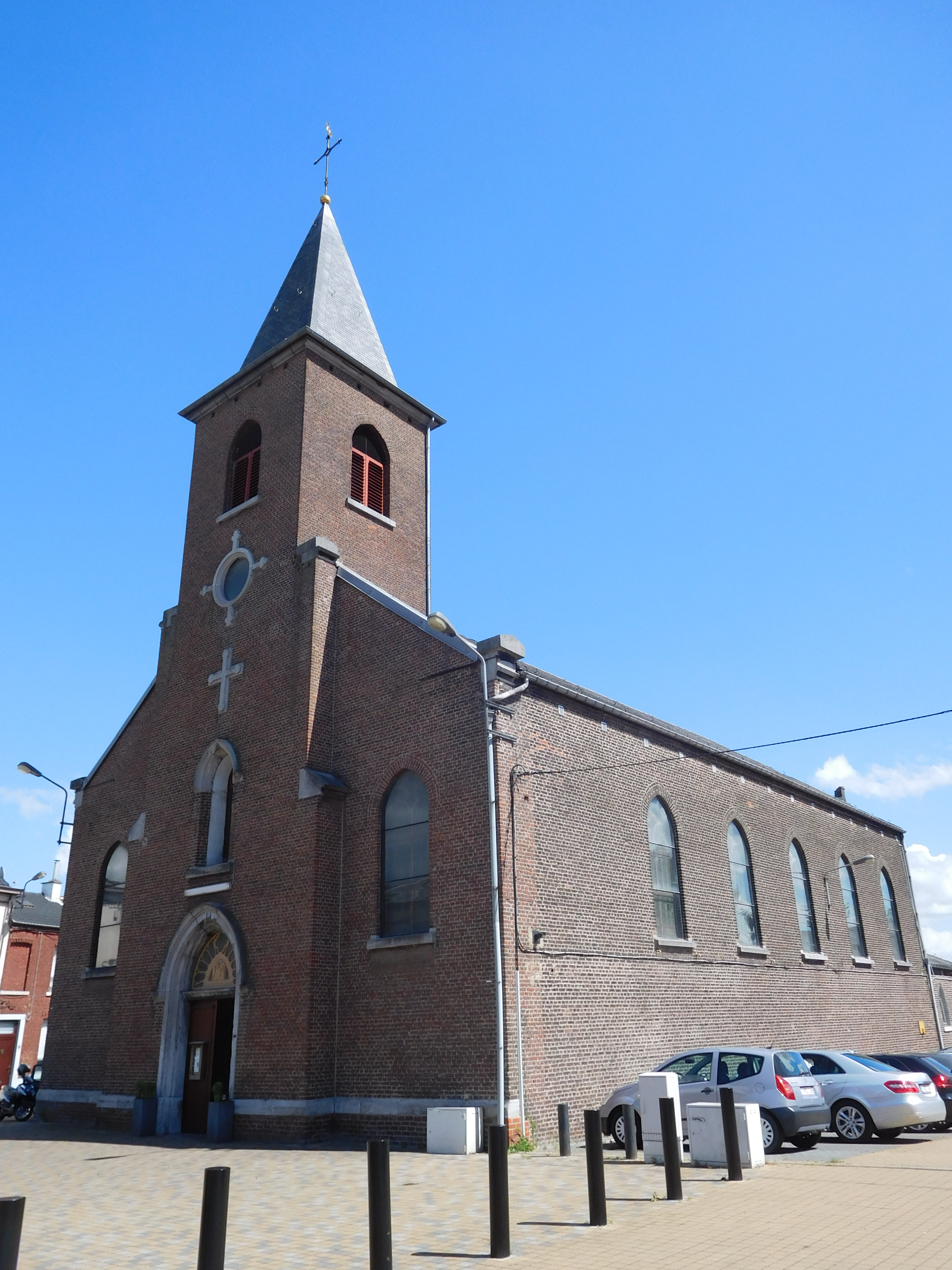
Immaculate Conception Church in Pironchamps

Pironchamps (French pronunciation: [piʁɔ̃ʃɑ̃]; Walloon: Pirontchamp) is a town of Wallonia and a district of the municipality of Farciennes, located in the province of Hainaut, Belgium.

It was a municipality before 1977.
