= Hourpes =

Belgian hamlet

Coordinates: 50.36799°N 4.30104°E

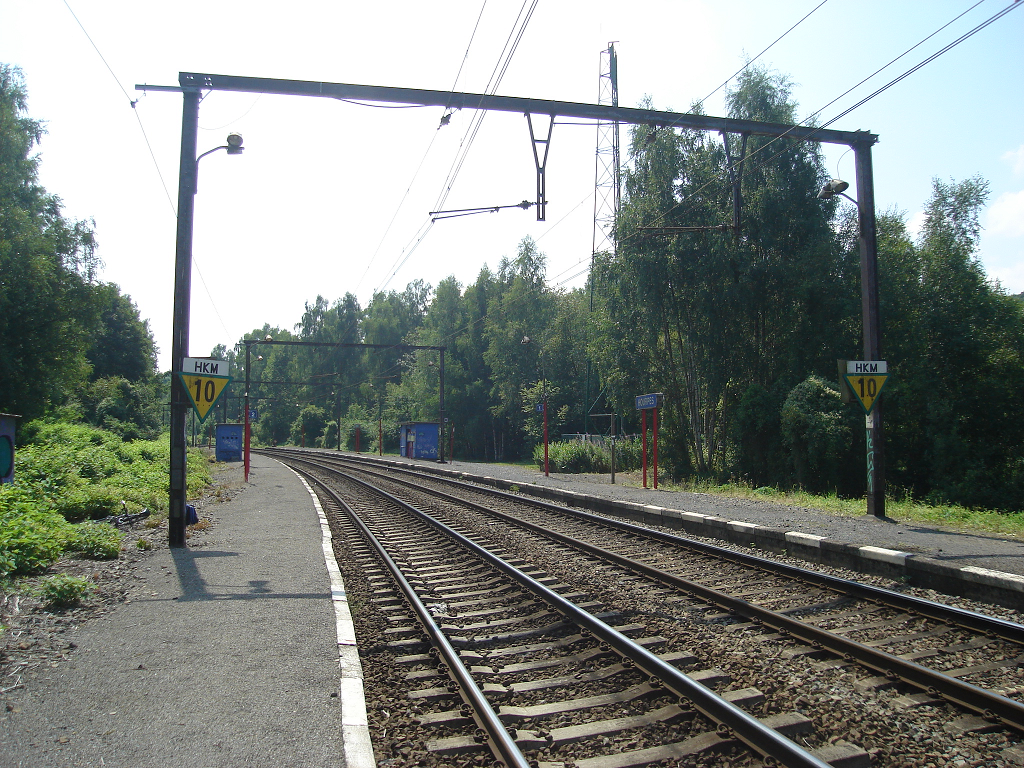
Hourpes Train Stop

Hourpes is a hamlet of Wallonia in the municipality and district of Thuin, located in the province of Hainaut, Belgium.

It is situated near the river Sambre about 5 kilometres (3.1 mi) north east of Thuin. It is about 121 metres (397 ft) above sea level, and has its own railway station (Gare de Hourpes), which it is located about 500 metres (550 yd) outside the hamlet.

A notable building in the hamlet is the Château de Hourpes built about 1887, it was purchased and renovated in the 21st century allegedly using money from a Value Added Tax (VAT) fraud.
