= Thuin =

City in Hainaut Province, Wallonia, Belgium

Thuin Twin (Walloon)
- Municipality
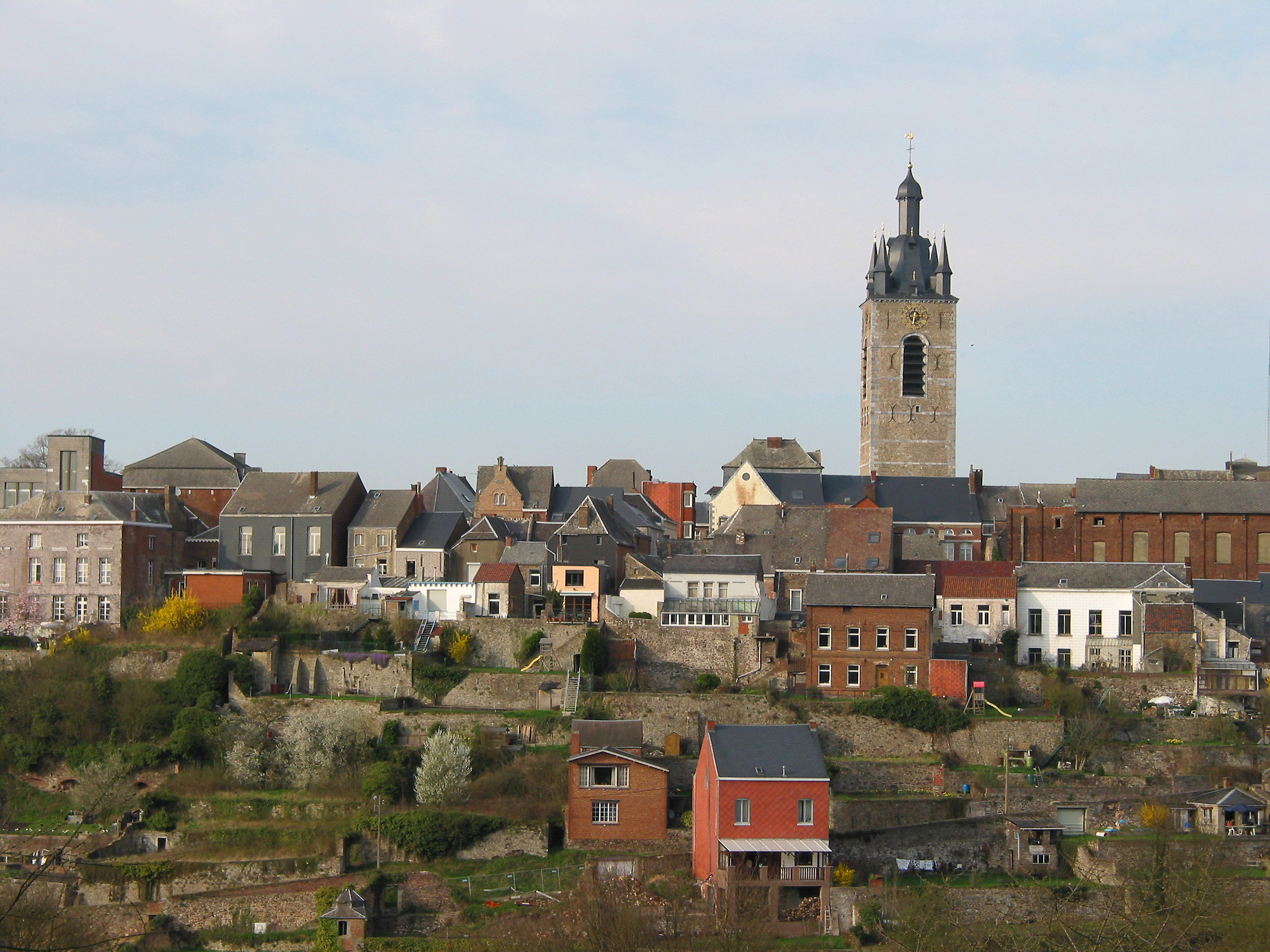
- The old city and the belfry

- Flag Coat of arms

- Location of Thuin in Hainaut
- Interactive map of Thuin
- Location in Belgium
- Coordinates: 50°20′N 04°17′E
- Country: Belgium
- Community: French Community
- Region: Wallonia
- Province: Hainaut
- Arrondissement: Thuin

Government
  - Mayor: Rachel Sobry (Mouvement Réformateur (Belgium)) MR
  - Governing party: PS-IC

Area
  - Total: 76.65 km^{2} (29.59 sq mi)

Population (2026-01-01)
  - Total: 14,916
  - Density: 194.6/km^{2} (504.0/sq mi)
- Postal codes: 6530-6534, 6536
- NIS code: 56078
- Area codes: 071
- Website: www.thuin.be

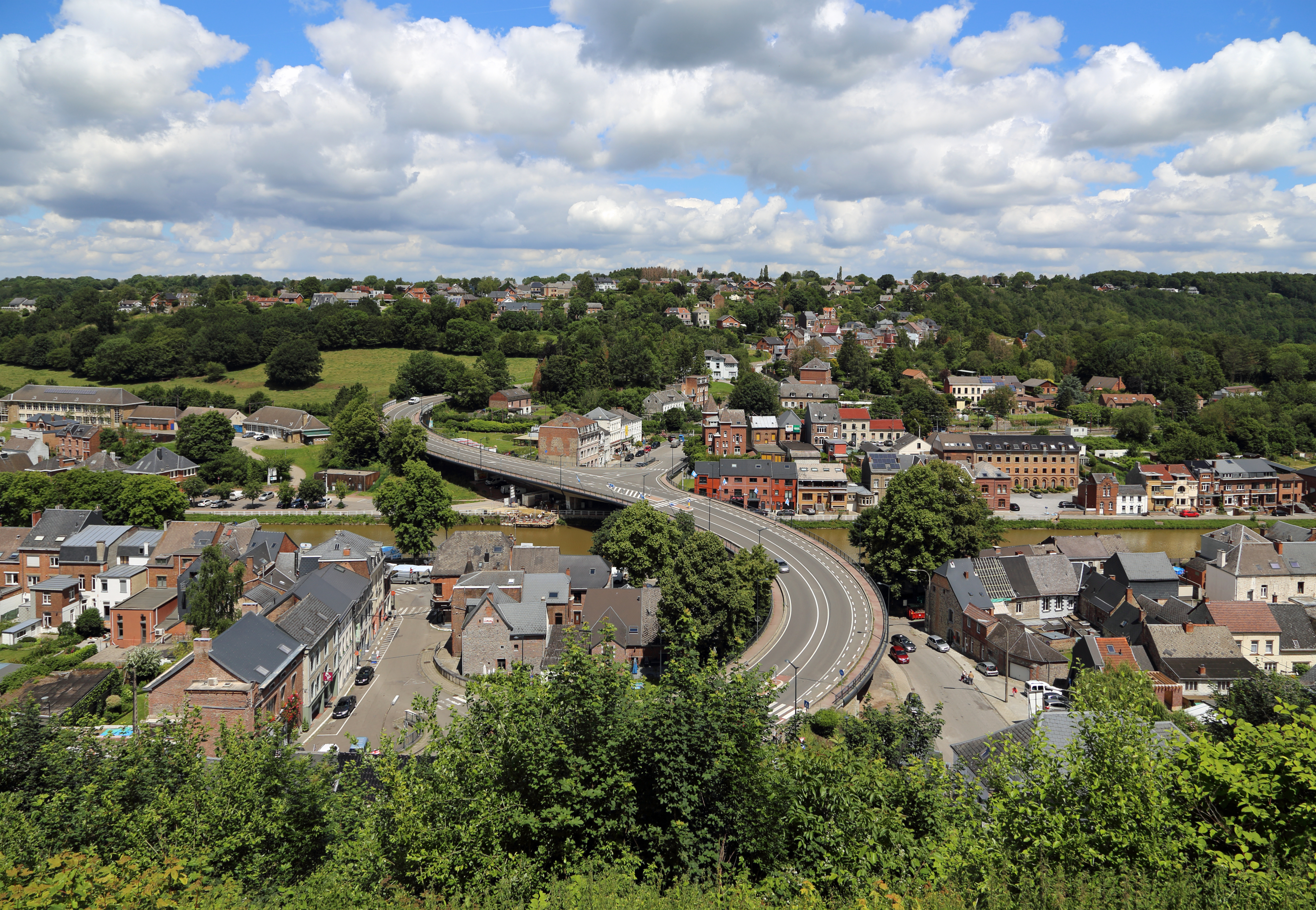
The Ville-Basse (lower part of the town) along the Sambre river

Thuin (French pronunciation: [tɥɛ̃] or [twɛ̃]; Walloon: Twin) is a city and municipality of Wallonia located in the province of Hainaut, Belgium.

The municipality consists of the following districts: Biercée, Biesme-sous-Thuin, Donstiennes, Gozée, Leers-et-Fosteau, Ragnies, Thuillies, and Thuin (including the hamlets of Hourpes and Maladrie.

Thuin is the headquarters of the Fédération Cynologique Internationale (International Canine Association).

== History ==
=== Origins ===
This area was already being used as a burial place in Gallo-Roman times, around the 2nd and 3rd century. The earliest name of the settlement, Thudinium Castellum, referring to a Roman fortification, is found on a 9th-century offering in Lobbes Abbey, which lists various neighbouring towns and related tithe duties. The village was a possession of the abbey of Lobbes and, together with the abbey, became part of the Bishopric of Liège in 888. The neighbouring Aulne Abbey, reputedly founded in the 7th century by Landelin, a repentant robber, was also made part of the Bishopric of Liège.

A century later, Prince-Bishop Notger had a defensive wall built in Thuin, which then became the westernmost of the 23 bonnes villes (or principal cities) of the bishopric.

=== The frontiers of the Bishopric of Liège ===
In the following centuries, several battles took place in this frontier area. In 1048, Adalbert, Duke of Lorraine was killed at the Battle of Thuin by Godfrey III, Duke of Lower Lorraine. Many more battles followed between the County of Hainaut and the Bishopric of Liège, with Thuin caught in between. Despite the stronger defensive walls that were built in the 12th century and in the 15th century, Thuin was besieged several times. The Aulne Abbey, which had been given to Saint Bernard of Clairvaux in 1147 fared better and was even expanded several times in the 16th and 18th century. In 1654, the Spanish army under the Prince of Condé tried in vain to take Thuin. The good fortunes of the city were attributed to the intercession of Saint Roch, who is still commemorated in the annual St-Roch procession. Several 17th-century buildings, including the belfry, can still be seen today in the upper city. In 1675, the troops of Louis XIV took and occupied Thuin until the Treaty of Nijmegen in 1678. Like its neighbour Charleroi, Thuin went in turn to Spain and Austria.

=== After the French Revolution ===
On May 10, 1794, during the French Revolutionary Wars, General Marceau expelled the Austrians and Thuin became part of France. The Aulne Abbey was burned to the ground. In 1829, on the eve of the Belgian Revolution, William II of the Netherlands was welcomed in Thuin, to no avail. The last major heavy fighting around Thuin occurred on August 23, 1914, at the onset of World War I, when the French army found itself nearly surrounded by the German army.

== Sights ==
- The Belfry of Thuin, dating from the 17th century, has been named a World Heritage Site by UNESCO. A view of the Thuin area can be seen from the top.
- Thuin is the location of the ASVi museum, specialising in the history of the Belgian Vicinal tramway system. This includes a museum tramway that runs through the streets of the town.
- The “hanging gardens” on the southern flank of the Thuin hill can be visited on foot, following a path enhanced by several explanation signs.
- The ruins of the 7th-century Aulne Abbey.
- The neighbouring village of Ragnies, also mentioned in the Lobbes offering, is a member of the most beautiful villages of Wallonia association.
- The Château du Fosteau dates from the 14th and 15th century. Its French gardens and pond are a haven of calm, while the interior of the castle harbours a permanent exhibit of ancient furniture and a small pharmacy museum.

== Festivities ==
- Every third Sunday of May, the town commemorates the help it received from Saint Roch during its fight against the Spanish army in 1654. The parade, as much a military march as a religious procession, was banned in the 18th century, but was reinstated in 1866 after Saint Roch delivered the city again, this time from an epidemic of cholera. The tradition has continued until today, interrupted only by the two world wars and the COVID-19 pandemic.

== People born in Thuin ==
- Roger Foulon, writer (20th century)

== Twin cities ==
- Italy: Torgnon
- France: Bletterans in the department of Jura

== See also ==
- Fédération Cynologique Internationale
