= Hamerton (surname) =

Hamerton is an English surname. Notable people with this surname include the following:

- Atkins Hamerton (1804–1857), British consul in Zanzibar
- Bob Hamerton (1911–1990), Canadian swimmer
- Greg Hamerton (born 1973), South African fantasy novelist and extreme sports writer
- John Miller Hamerton (1778–1855), British Army officer
- Philip Gilbert Hamerton (1834–1894), British art critic and writer
- Robert Hamerton-Kelly (1938–2013), South African Christian theologian, United Methodist pastor and author
