= Dutch 7th Infantry Battalion =

- Active: 1815
- Country: Kingdom of the Netherlands
- Branch: Army
- Type: Infantry
- Size: Regiment
- Engagements: Battle of Quatre Bras (1815); Battle of Waterloo (1815)

Commanders
- Notable commanders: F.C. van den Sande

The Belgian 7th Line Infantry Battalion (Dutch: Bataljon Infanterie van Linie nr. 7) was a Belgian/Southern Netherlands regular (line) battalion commanded by lieutenant-kolonel F.C. van den Sande which fought with distinction during the Waterloo Campaign of 1815.

== Formation ==
The 7th originated from the 2^{de} Regiment "Vlaanderen" of the Belgian Legion. The battalion was stationed in Ghent, where it would also receive its colours. A lot of officers, non-commissioned officers and men were veterans of the Grande Armée of Napoleon Bonaparte.

== Waterloo Campaign ==
The 7th played an important role in both the Battles of Quatre Bras and Waterloo, where Napoleon Bonaparte was finally defeated by the Anglo-allied army commanded by the Duke of Wellington and the Prussians under Prince Blucher. As a part of the 1st "Van Bylandt's brigade" the battalion first saw action at Quatre Bras on 16 June 1815, to counter the advance of the French Army. Two days later, on 18 June, during the Battle of Waterloo it had to endure the first massive attack by the French I Corps commanded by d'Erlon. When the Brigade had to withdraw through sheer weight of numbers, the 7th was able to hold up the French I Corps long enough for the neighbouring British 8th and 9th brigades to move in to fill the gaps. Even though the entire Bylandt's brigade received heavy losses, they would remain in place for the entire battle.

After the Battle of Waterloo the Wellington's Anglo-allied army, including the 7th, moved on to Paris.

== Merger ==
After the occupation the battalion returned to the Southern Netherlands. In December 1815 it would be merged with three battalions of Nationale Militie (30, 31 and 32) into the 6^{de} Afdeeling Infanterie.
