= Battle of Quatre Bras =

1815 battle during the War of the Seventh Coalition

- Part of the Waterloo campaign
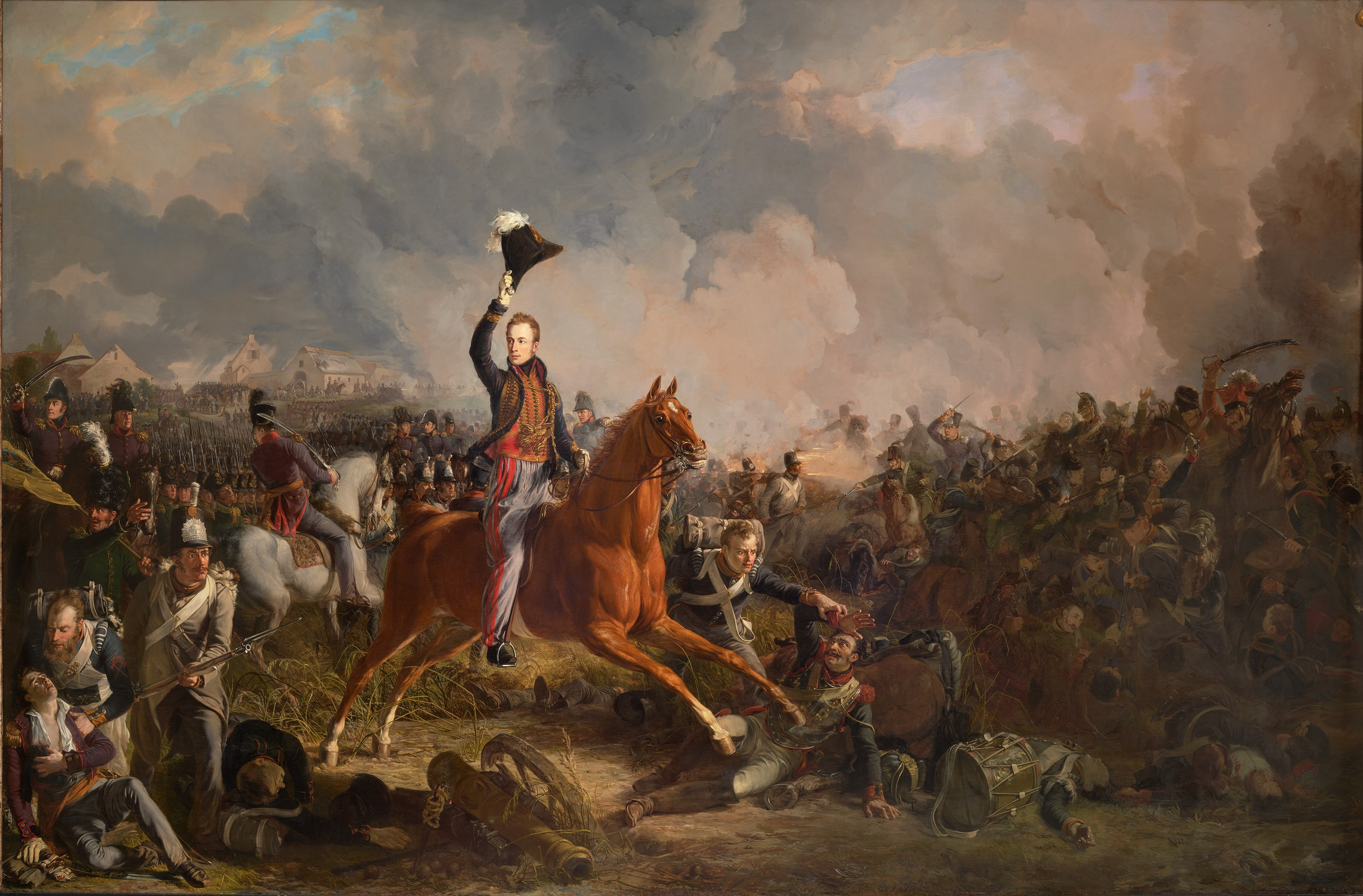
- The Prince of Orange at Quatre Bras; Jan Willem Pieneman, 1818
Date	16 June 1815
Location	Quatre Bras, present-day Belgium 50°34′17″N 4°27′12″E
Result	Inconclusive

Belligerents
France	Seventh Coalition: (United Kingdom of Great Britain and Ireland) United Kingdom; Netherlands; Hanover; Nassau; Brunswick

Commanders and leaders
Michel Ney; Honoré Charles Reille; Jérôme Bonaparte	(United Kingdom of Great Britain and Ireland) Arthur Wellesley; (United Kingdom of Great Britain and Ireland) Thomas Picton; William II; Frederick William †

Strength
20,000–21,000	32,000–36,000

Casualties and losses
4,140–4,400 killed or wounded	4,800–5,600 killed or wounded

Hundred Days:
Waterloo campaign
current battle
Napoleon in command
Napoleon not in command

The Battle of Quatre Bras was fought on 16 June 1815, as a preliminary engagement to the decisive Battle of Waterloo that occurred two days later. The battle took place near the strategic crossroads of Quatre Bras (Note: Quatre Bras, meaning "Four Arms" in English, is located in modern day Belgium; at the time, it was part of the United Kingdom of the Netherlands) and was contested between elements of the Duke of Wellington's Anglo-allied army and the left wing of Napoleon Bonaparte's French Armée du Nord under Marshal Michel Ney. The battle was a tactical victory for Wellington (as he possessed the field at dusk), but because Ney prevented him going to the aid of Blücher's Prussians who were fighting the French army under the command of Napoleon Bonaparte at Ligny it was a strategic victory for the French.

== Prelude ==
Map of the Waterloo campaign

Facing two armies (Wellington's arriving from the west and the Prussians under Field Marshal von Blücher from the east), Napoleon's overall strategy was to defeat each in turn, before these forces could join. Napoleon intended to cross the border into what is now Belgium (but was then part of the United Kingdom of the Netherlands) without alerting the Coalition leaders and drive a wedge between their forces. He planned to defeat the Prussian army, forcing them to retreat eastward, and then turn to engage Wellington, driving his army back to the Channel coast.

Napoleon recognized that, if Wellington's Anglo-allied army could join with the Prussians, the combined force would be larger than his French army. The crossroads at Quatre Bras therefore became a strategic position, since if the French held this interchange, they could prevent Wellington's forces from moving south-eastward along the Nivelles-Namur road towards the Prussians, where Napoleon was planning to engage von Blücher on 16 June at Ligny.

Although the Coalition commanders were receiving intelligence, Napoleon's planning was initially successful. Wellington remarked: "Napoleon has humbugged me, by God; he has gained twenty-four hours' march on me."

While Wellington's instructions at the start of the campaign were to defend Brussels from the French, he was not sure what route Napoleon's army would follow; he also received (false) reports of a flanking maneuver through Mons to the southwest. Wellington first received reports of the outbreak of hostilities at around 15:00 on 15 June from the Prince of Orange, a Coalition commander. Within the next few hours, he received additional news that the French had skirmished early that morning with the Prussian First Corps under Lieutenant-General Graf von Zieten at Thuin (near Charleroi). These reports prompted Wellington at 18:00 to draft initial orders to concentrate his army. However, he was still uncertain precisely where to bring his forces together, and it was not until almost midnight, when he learned that the front near Mons was clear, that he ordered his army to move towards the Prussians.

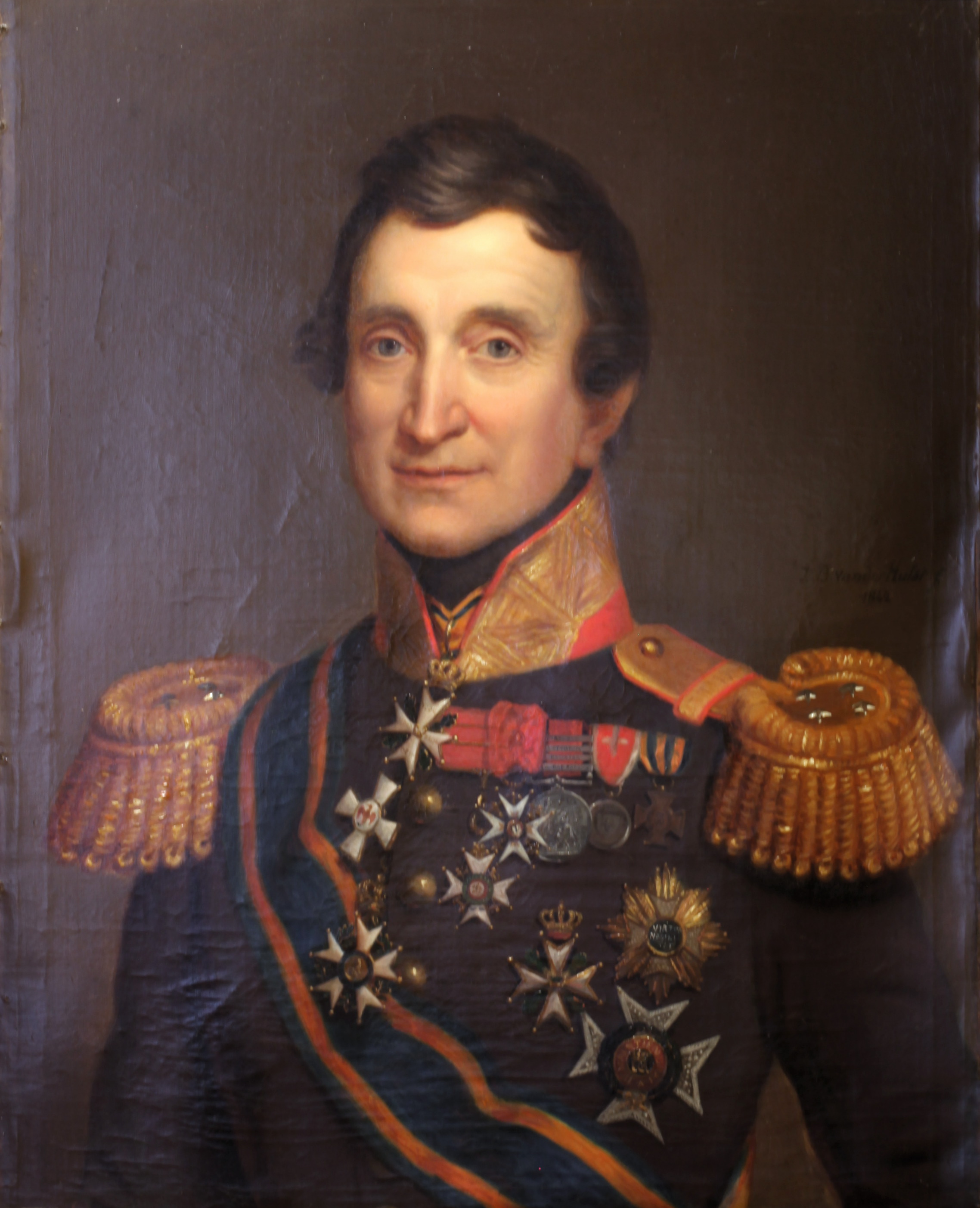
Major-General Jean Victor de Constant Rebecque

This nine-hour delay meant it was too late for him to move his army in sufficient strength to provide von Blücher with support on 16 June at the Battle of Ligny. Wellington did not order his entire army to Quatre Bras on 16 June, still suspecting a flanking maneuver through Mons. The headquarters of the Anglo-allied First Corps (Prince of Orange's), however, decided to ignore Wellington's order that it should assemble in and around Nivelles, instead opting to take the initiative and converge on Quatre Bras.

Napoleon's original plan for 16 June was based on the assumption that the Coalition forces, which had been caught off guard, would not attempt a risky forward concentration; he intended therefore to push an advanced guard as far as Gembloux, for the purpose of feeling for and warding off von Blücher. To assist in this operation, the reserve would move first to Fleurus to reinforce Marshal Grouchy who was tasked with driving back the Prussian troops. However, once the French were in possession of Sombreffe, Napoleon planned to swing the reserve westwards to join with Marshal Ney, who—it was supposed—would have by that time secured the Quatre Bras crossroad.

Accordingly Marshal Ney, to whom III Cavalry Corps (Kellermann) was now attached, was to mass at Quatre Bras and push an advance guard 10 kilometres (6.2 miles) northward of that place, sending a connecting division at Marbais to link him with Grouchy. The centre and left wing together would then make a night-march toward Brussels. The Coalition forces would thus be forcefully separated, and all that remained would be to destroy each in detail. Napoleon now awaited further information from his wing commanders at Charleroi, where he massed the VI Corps (Lobau's), to save it, if possible, from a harassing countermarch, as it appeared likely that it would only be needed for the march to Brussels.

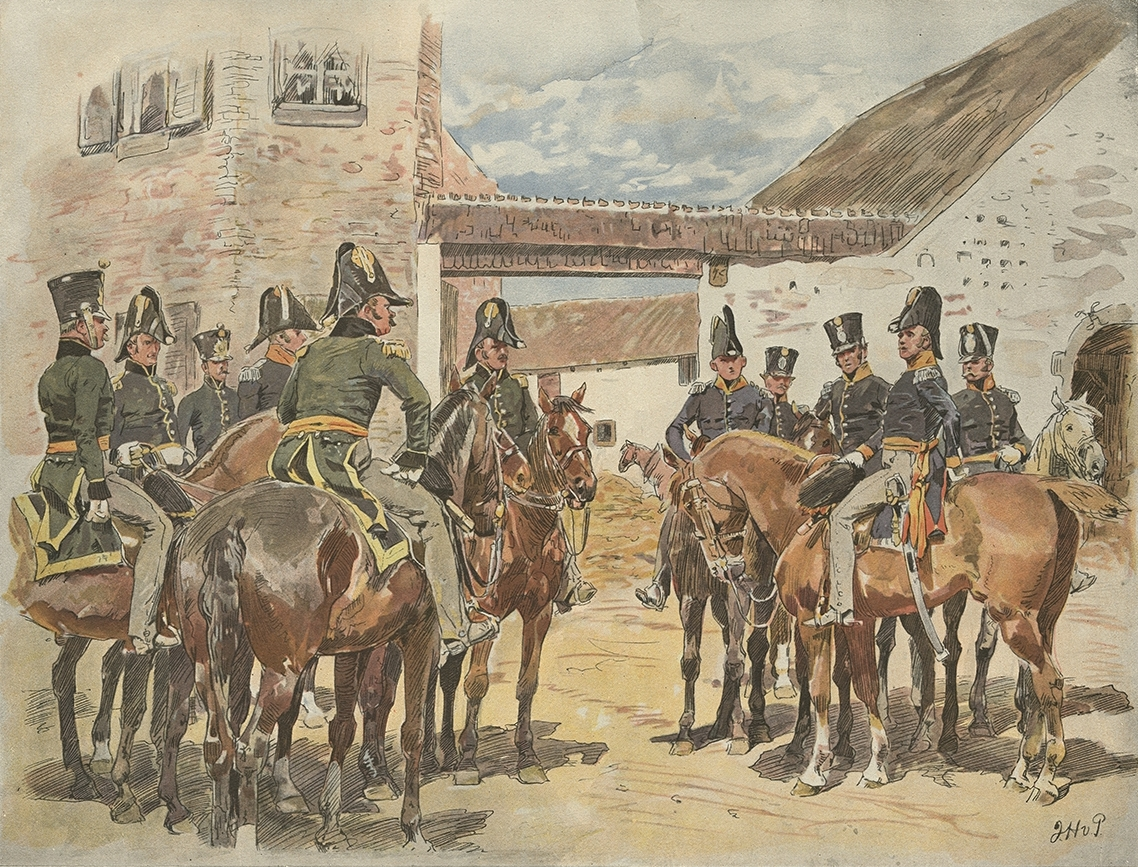
The Prince Bernhard of Saxe-Weimar-Eisenach tells the officers of his brigade to stand their ground at Quatre-Bras

On 15 June as the Prussian I Corps withdrew towards Ligny, there was a danger for the Coalition forces that Ney would be able to advance through Quatre Bras and take his objectives with little or no Coalition opposition. At the headquarters of the I Corps at Genappe (about five kilometres (3 miles) from Quatre Bras), Major-General Jean Victor de Constant Rebecque, chief of staff to the Prince of Orange, realised the danger and ordered Lieutenant-General Hendrik George de Perponcher Sedlnitsky, the commander of the 2nd Dutch Division, to dispatch his 2nd Brigade (Prince Bernhard of Saxe-Weimar-Eisenach) to occupy Quatre Bras. This brigade, consisting of two regiments from Nassau, arrived at about 14:00 on 15 June. Prince Bernhard was able to deploy prior to the arrival of the first French scouts, lancers of the Guard Light Cavalry Division (Lefebvre-Desnouettes) who approached Quatre Bras. These French lancers were engaged at Frasnes, after which the Nassauers retreated to the Bois de Bossu, a thick patch of forest near Quatre Bras. "6:30 p.m. – some accounts say 5:30" General Lefebvre-Desnouëtte requested infantry support, but as night was approaching, and his infantry was strung out along the Brussels-Charleroi road, Ney declined the request, instead deciding to camp for the night and approach Quatre Bras in force the following day. Early on the evening of 15 June, instead of obeying Wellington's order to concentrate the I Corps at Nivelles (which would have meant that the force occupying Quatre Bras would be abandoning the position), Rebecque ordered the 1st Brigade (Van Bylandt's brigade) of the 2nd Dutch Division to reinforce Prince Bernhard's 2nd Brigade.

By countermanding a direct order from Wellington and using his own initiative, Rebecque was responsible for the battle being fought at Quatre Bras on the following day, thereby preventing the French from keeping the two coalition armies apart and destroying each of them in detail.

Ney spent the morning of 16 June massing his I and II corps, and reconnoitering the enemy at Quatre Bras, who, he was informed, had been reinforced. But up till noon he took no serious steps to capture the crossroads, which he could have done with relative ease. In the meantime, Grouchy reported from Fleurus that Prussians were coming up from Namur, but Napoleon does not appear to have attached much importance to this report. He was still at Charleroi when, between 09:00 and 10:00, further news reached him that hostile forces had concentrated at Quatre Bras. He at once wrote to Ney saying that these could only be some of Wellington's troops, and that Ney was to concentrate his force and crush what was in front of him, adding that Ney was to send all reports to Fleurus. Then, leaving Marshal Lobau's force provisionally at Charleroi, Napoleon hastened to Fleurus, arriving about 11:00.

=== Meeting at the Windmill of Bussy ===
Shortly after 11:00, Wellington observed that the French were not in any great force at Frasnes (south of Quatre Bras). At the same time, accounts reached him that the Prussians, in position at Ligny, were being menaced by the advance of a considerable French force. Wellington, accompanied by his staff and a small escort of cavalry, rode off to hold a conference with von Blücher, whom he met at the Windmill of Bussy (often referred to as the Windmill of Brye) between Ligny and Brye. Because this windmill was at the highest point of the Prussian position, the leaders were able to observe the French preparatory deployments prior to their attack.

These observations led Wellington to conclude that Napoleon was bringing the main force of his army to bear against the Prussians; he at once proposed to assist von Blücher by first advancing straight upon Frasnes and Gosselies, as soon as he was able to concentrate sufficient force, and then attack the French from their left and rear, thus providing a powerful diversion to aid the Prussians, since von Blücher's right wing was the weakest and most exposed, and considering Napoleon's movements was the most likely to be attacked.

The primary sources do not agree on what was said at the meeting. They all agree that Wellington promised aid to Blücher, but they disagree on whether Wellington made an unequivocal promise of aid, or whether Wellington made it clear that his ability to give timely assistance to Blücher was only possible if his forces were not engaged before he could send aid. (Note: So did [Wellington] promise to come to Blücher aid at Ligny? The answer is a simple yes ... Prussian accounts of the meeting make no mention of the qualifying "providing I am not attacked myself", while von Müfflung [Prussian liaison officer seconded to Wellington's staff] does record those words. General von Dornberg, Prussian-born but serving in the British army [as commander of the 3rd British Brigade], recalled something similar; he claimed Wellington said "I will see what is opposing me and how much of my army has arrived and then act accordingly." In addition, three Prussian accounts claim that not only did the Duke promise to come, but that he even offered Blücher the exact time he expected to arrive, though as one account says the expected arrival time was 2 p.m., the second 3 p.m. and the third von Clausewitz, who was not even present, 4 p.m. ... So the accounts differ, but Wellington had already seen for himself the French presence at Quatre-Bras and he would hardly have given a promise that he knew was most unlikely to be kept. He expected a fight at Quatre-Bras and must have warned his Prussian allies of that strong possibility. Gneisenau always blamed Wellington for the outcome of Ligny, describing it as "the defeat we had suffered because of him" ... — Bernard Cornwell.)

Siborne, writing from eyewitness accounts, records it thus:

"Upon a calculation being made, however, of the time which would elapse ere the Duke would be able to collect the requisite force for undertaking this operation, and of the possibility of Blucher being defeated before it could be carried into effect, it was considered preferable that Wellington should, if practicable, move to the support of the Prussian Right by the Namur road. But a direct support of this kind was necessarily contingent on circumstances, and subject to the Duke's discretion. The latter having expressed his confident expectation of being enabled to afford the desired support, as also of his succeeding in concentrating, very shortly, a sufficient force to assume the offensive, rode back to Quatre Bras."

== Combatants ==
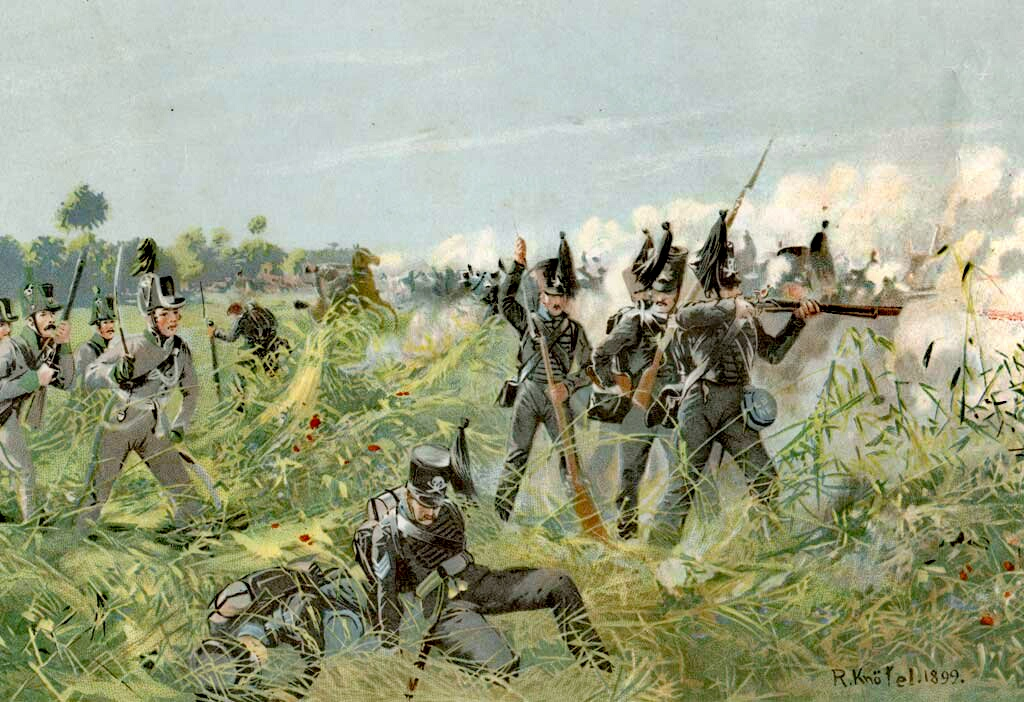
Brunswickers during the Battle of Quatre-Bras.

At the beginning of the battle the left wing of the Armée du Nord, with 18,000 men (including 2,000 cavalry and 32 guns) under Marshal Michel Ney, faced 8,000 infantry and 16 guns, under the command of William, Prince of Orange. The Dutch (with the Nassauers of 2nd Brigade) were thinly deployed south of the crossroads of Quatre Bras. Fresh allied troops started to arrive two hours later, along with Wellington, who took over command of the allied forces. As the day wore on, fresh Dutch, British and Brunswickers arrived faster than fresh French troops (who eventually numbered about 24,000).

== Battle ==
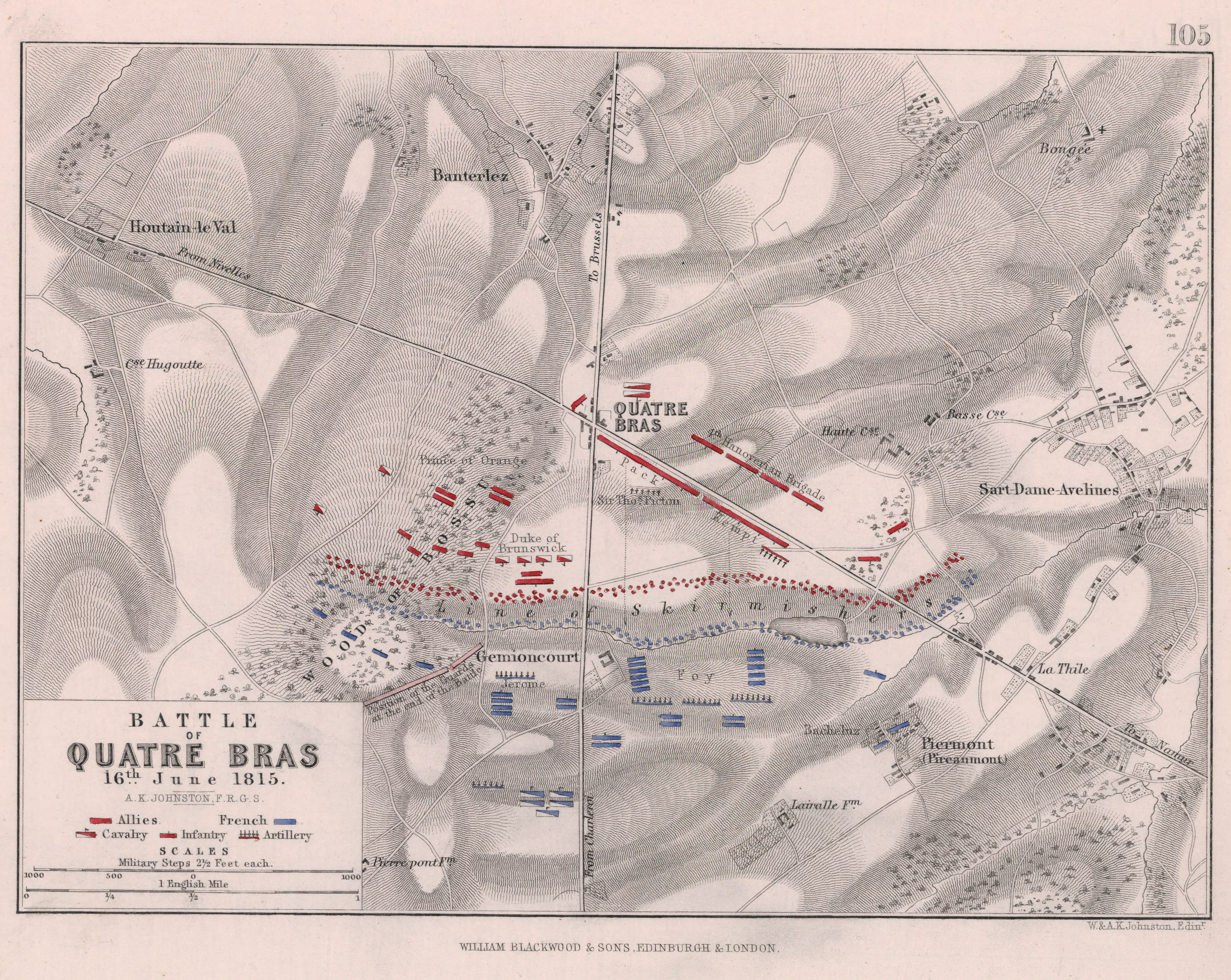
Detailed map of the battle of Quatre Bras, 16 June 1815 (Atlas to Alison's history of Europe)

Fighting started late in the afternoon on 15 June, when the Elba squadron, a small Polish lancer unit consisting of only 109 men and officers, tried to attack the allied forces from the direction of Frasnes. These forces consisted of the II/2nd Nassau regiment and Bijlevelds horse artillery. The Dutch and Nassau commanders had taken precautions, however, and the Lancers were greeted by canister and volley fire, losing some men and horses before retiring to Frasnes. Patrols were sent out and the positions were kept until the next morning.

From 5 a.m. on 16 June there were continuous skirmishes between allied and French forces, in which neither side managed to get an advantage. Some Prussian hussars, cut off from their main body, skirmished with the Red Lancers, but they disengaged after Bijleveld's artillery once again drove the lancers back. Two companies of Nassau infantry advanced towards Frasnes, but this time the French pushed them back. Some time after 6 a.m., after the Prince of Orange arrived, the skirmishes stopped.

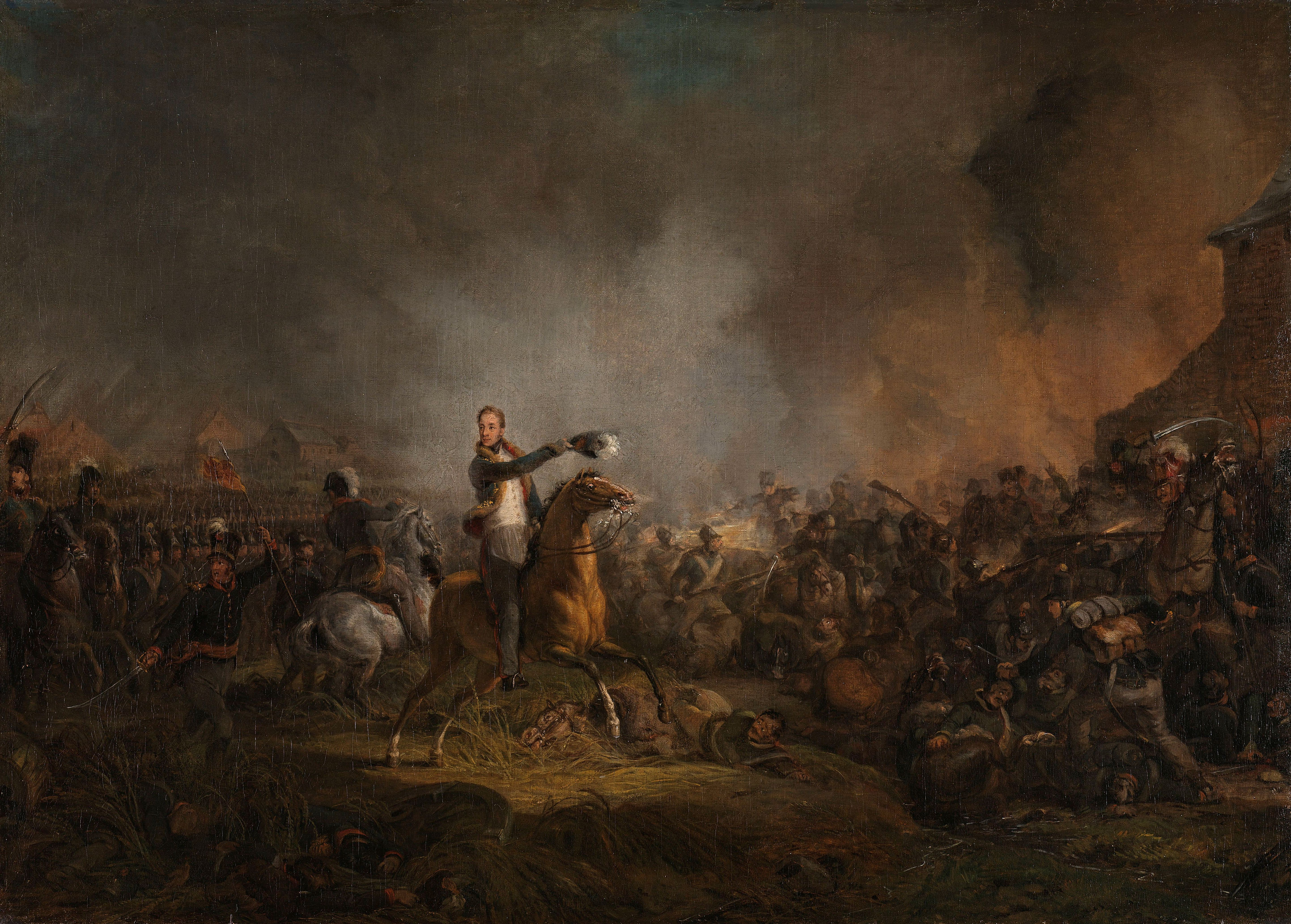
The Prince of Orange leads his Dutch troops at Quatre-Bras

The real battle began with the French attack around 14:00 hours. Ney massed a battery of 22 guns and started bombarding the Coalition positions. Swarms of skirmishers preceded the French columns as they attacked. The Dutch picket line of the 2nd Division (Sedlnitsky) greeted them with musket volleys, but it was outnumbered and those east of the Brussels highway were at once forced back by the mass of men moved against them. The Nassauers of 2nd Brigade (Prince Bernhard of Saxe-Weimar) retreated to Grand-Pierrepont farm and Dutch troops of the 1st Brigade (Bylandt) to Gemioncourt, but the allies managed, however, to hold the wood. Facing three infantry divisions and a cavalry brigade, the situation became desperate for the 2nd Division. At around 15:00 the 5th British Infantry Division (Picton) and the 3rd Dutch Light Cavalry Brigade (Baron van Merlen) arrived. The Duke of Wellington came back from his meeting with Blücher and took command. He deployed Picton's Division on the allied left flank where it stopped the French advance to the east of the road. The fresh French 6th Division (Prince Jérôme Bonaparte) arrived on the scene. A fierce fight now broke out all along the line. Picton, showing a dauntless front, maintained his position, while the French 6th Division were sent against Grand-Pierrepont. The Nassauers were forced to abandon the farm and were driven into the Bossu wood. There they fought from tree to tree, slowing the French advance. At Gemioncourt the Dutch troops were a thorn in the side of the French.

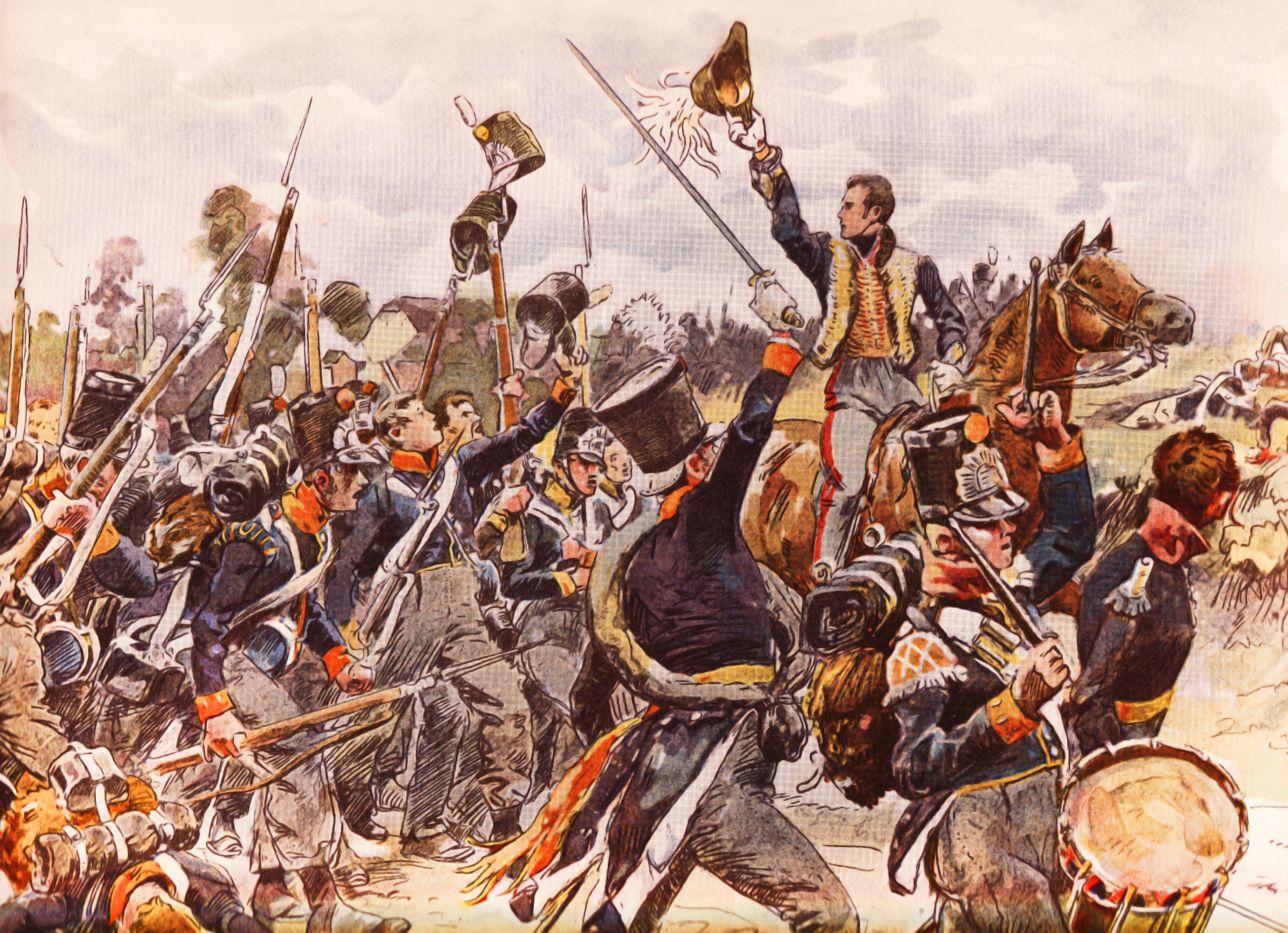
The Prince of Orange at the head of the 5th National Militia

The defending battalion of Gemincourt Farm, the 5th National Militia, lost 62% of its original strength that day. It was driven out by the 4th Light and 100th Line regiments, but regrouped north of the farm when the Dutchmen saw the 28th British Foot come to their aid. But this regiment thought the farmhouse was lost and retreated, while the 5th Militia, thinking they were going to get reinforced, charged the farmhouse again and drove the French regiments from the surroundings of the farm, but were unable to take the farm itself. The 5th managed to take up position south of the farm, where their Prince joined them. With artillery support, they repulsed the 6th Chasseurs-Au-Cheval and a lancer regiment. The Dutch lost and retook the farm another time, but eventually lost it.

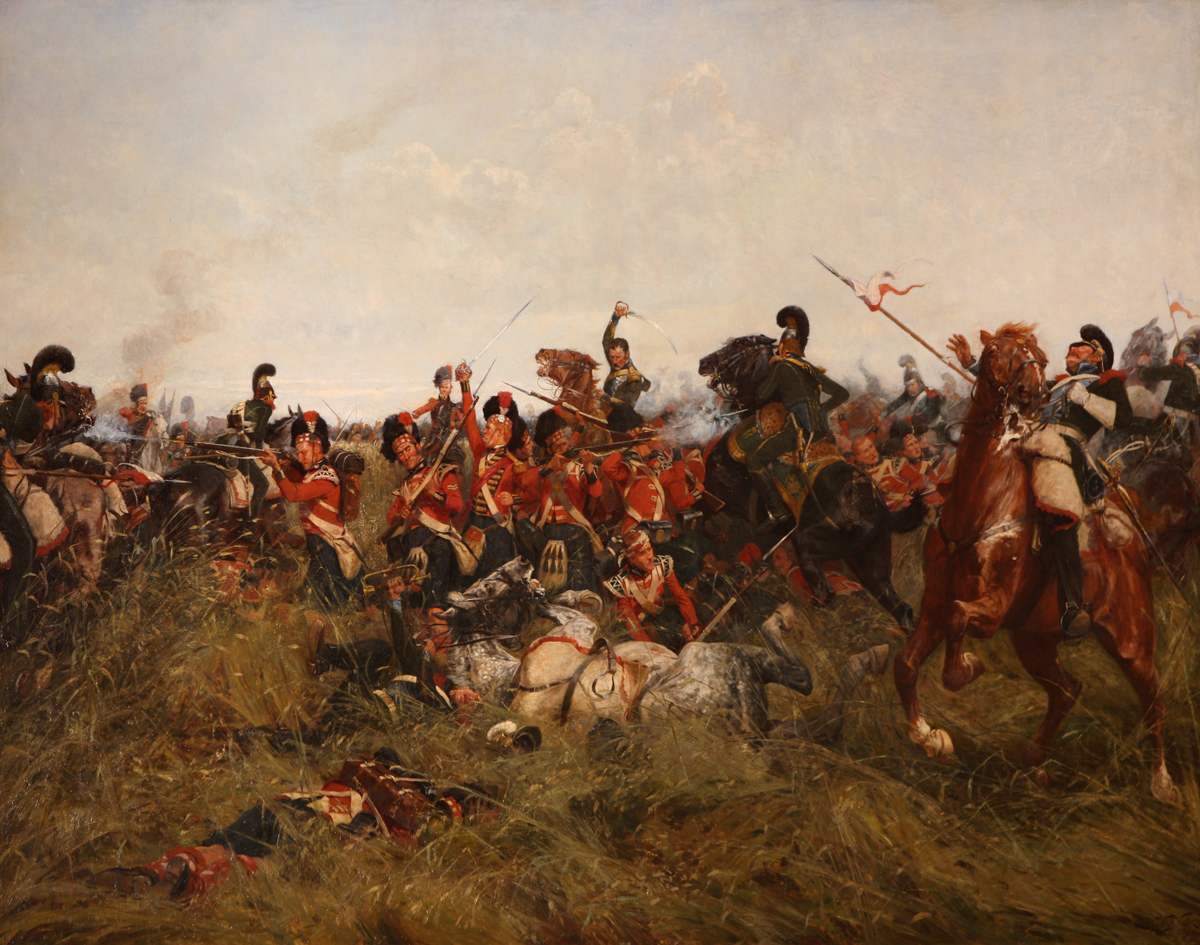
Quatre Bras (Black Watch at Bay) by William Barnes Wollen in the collection of Black Watch Museum.

By 15:00, the French formed a line between Pierrepont through Gemioncourt to Piraumont. At 15:30 the Dutch 2nd Light Cavalry Brigade (van Merlen), (Note: Some sources number this the 3rd Light Cavalry Brigade. (See footnotes "1st Heavy 2nd Light, 3rd Light/Heavy, 1st Light, 2nd Light" in the article Order of battle of the Waterloo Campaign for details)) led by the Prince of Orange, charged the French line; although they were met by French cavalry and were thrown back, this gave the battered Dutch infantry time to regroup. When the Dutch cavalry brigade disengaged and retired to friendly lines they were shot at by Scottish infantry because their uniforms looked like the French uniforms of the chasseurs à cheval. The Brunswick Corps, under the Duke of Brunswick, now reached the field, but their commander received a mortal wound while leading a charge and the attack failed. At 16:15 Ney received Napoleon's order (despatched at 14:00), to attack vigorously. He sent an order to his II Corps (Honoré Reille) to attack with more force.

On Ney's left, Prince Jérôme drove the allies out of the Bossu wood. French mixed forces advanced almost all the way to the crossroads. Regiments of the British 9th Brigade (Pack) – 42nd ("Black Watch", Macara), 44th ("East Essex", Hamerton) and 92nd ("Gordon Highlanders", John Cameron) – held up against the infantry. French of the 2nd Brigade of the 2nd Cavalry Division (Piré) counter-attacked and severely mauled the 42nd and 44th before they were driven off.

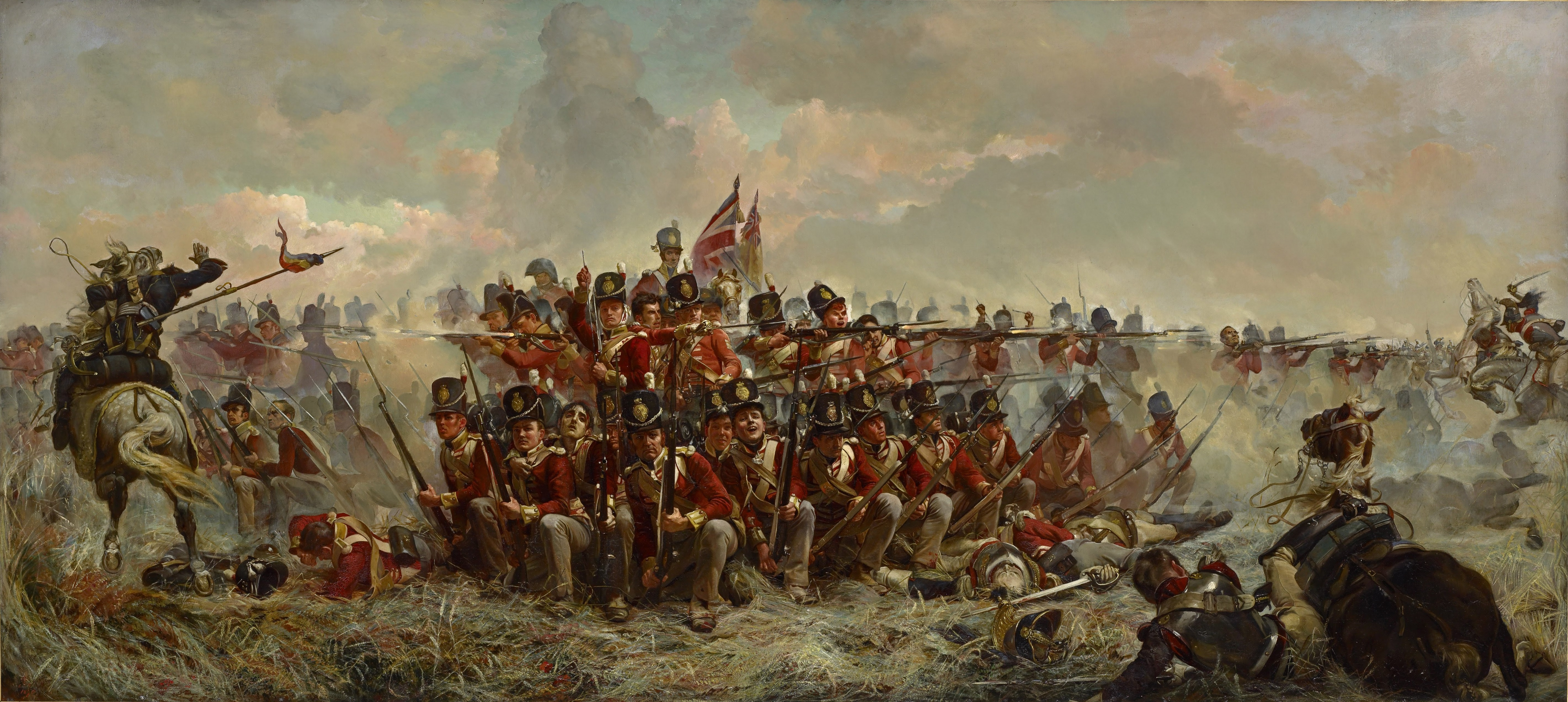
The 28th Regiment at Quatre Bras (at approximately 17:00) by Elizabeth Thompson, 1875

At 17:00 the timely arrival of the British 3rd Division (Alten), coming in from Nivelles, tipped the numerical balance back in favour of the allies. At quarter past the hour Ney heard that the French I Corps (d'Erlon), without his direct order or knowledge, had moved eastwards to assist in the Battle of Ligny. Fifteen minutes later at 17:30 he received an unclear order from Napoleon to seize Quatre Bras and then turn eastwards to crush Blücher, who was caught at Ligny. Due to the arrival of allied reinforcements, Ney realised that he could capture and hold Quatre Bras only with the support of the I Corps and he sent imperative orders to d'Erlon to return at once. To keep the pressure on Wellington, immediately after sending for d'Erlon, Ney ordered Kellermann to lead his one available cuirassier brigade and break through Wellington's line.

Kellermann's cuirassiers caught the British 5th Brigade (Halkett) – 33rd ("West Riding", Lieutenant-Colonel William George Keith Elphinstone) 69th ("South Lincolnshire", Morice) and the 73rd (Harris) – in line formation. The 69th were badly mauled, losing their King's colour (the only battalion under Wellington's direct command to do so); the 33rd and the 73rd were saved from a similar fate by running for the safety of Bossu wood where they rallied quickly. The cuirassiers reached the crossroads but were driven back by close range artillery and musket fire.

The arrival of the British 1st Infantry Division (Guards Division, Cooke) gave Wellington sufficient strength to counter-attack and Jérôme, whose skirmishers were now west of Quatre Bras, was forced to retreat and give up possession of Bossu wood to the British Guards. When the Guards and other allied units emerged from the wood, they were met with heavy fire from French infantry and an attack by 6th Lancer Regiment (and possibly the 1st Chasseurs) of the 2nd Cavalry Division (Piré); the Guards were caught in line and forced to flee back into the wood. This cavalry attack and taking the Bossu wood caused high casualties among the British Guards. There was some further skirmishing between allied light companies and the French voltigeurs and cavalry screen, but the battle was over. By 21:00, when the fighting stopped, the French had been forced to give up all of their territorial gains.

== Aftermath ==
The battle cost Ney 4,000 men to Wellington's 4,800. Although the allies had won the field, the French prevented them from coming to the aid of the Prussians at the Battle of Ligny. Wellington's Anglo-allied army, upon learning of the Prussian defeat, was forced to retreat north along the Brussels road further away from the Prussians, who retreated north-east towards Wavre. There has been much debate about what would have happened if d'Erlon's I Corps had engaged at either Ligny or Quatre Bras. As he did not, Napoleon chose to follow Wellington with the bulk of his forces and two days later met him at Waterloo.

The allied tactical victory at Quatre Bras did prevent Ney from controlling these strategic crossroads. This in turn slowed down the French advance, thereby allowing Wellington to take a position on the Waterloo battlegrounds, which would otherwise not have been possible and would have led, as some believe, to an allied defeat.

After the Waterloo campaign, Wellington was given the title Prince of Waterloo by the Dutch King William I. Along with the title came lands, which encompassed a large area of the battlefield of Quatre Bras. As landowner, the Duke and his successors had a large part of the Bossu wood felled for timber.

Monuments

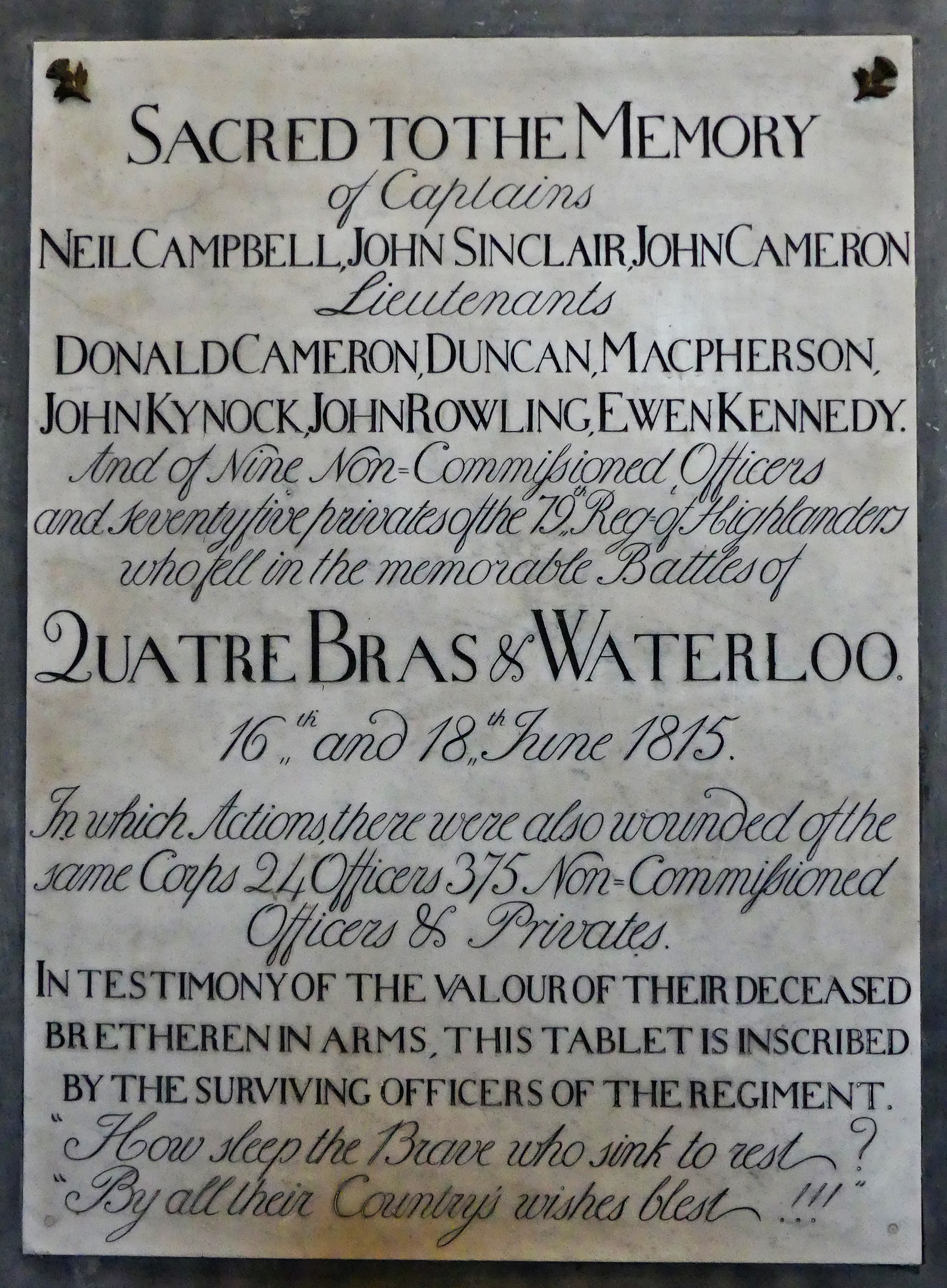
In the church of Waterloo the victims of both battles of Quatre-Bras and Waterloo (16 and 18 June 1815) are associated in the same remembrance

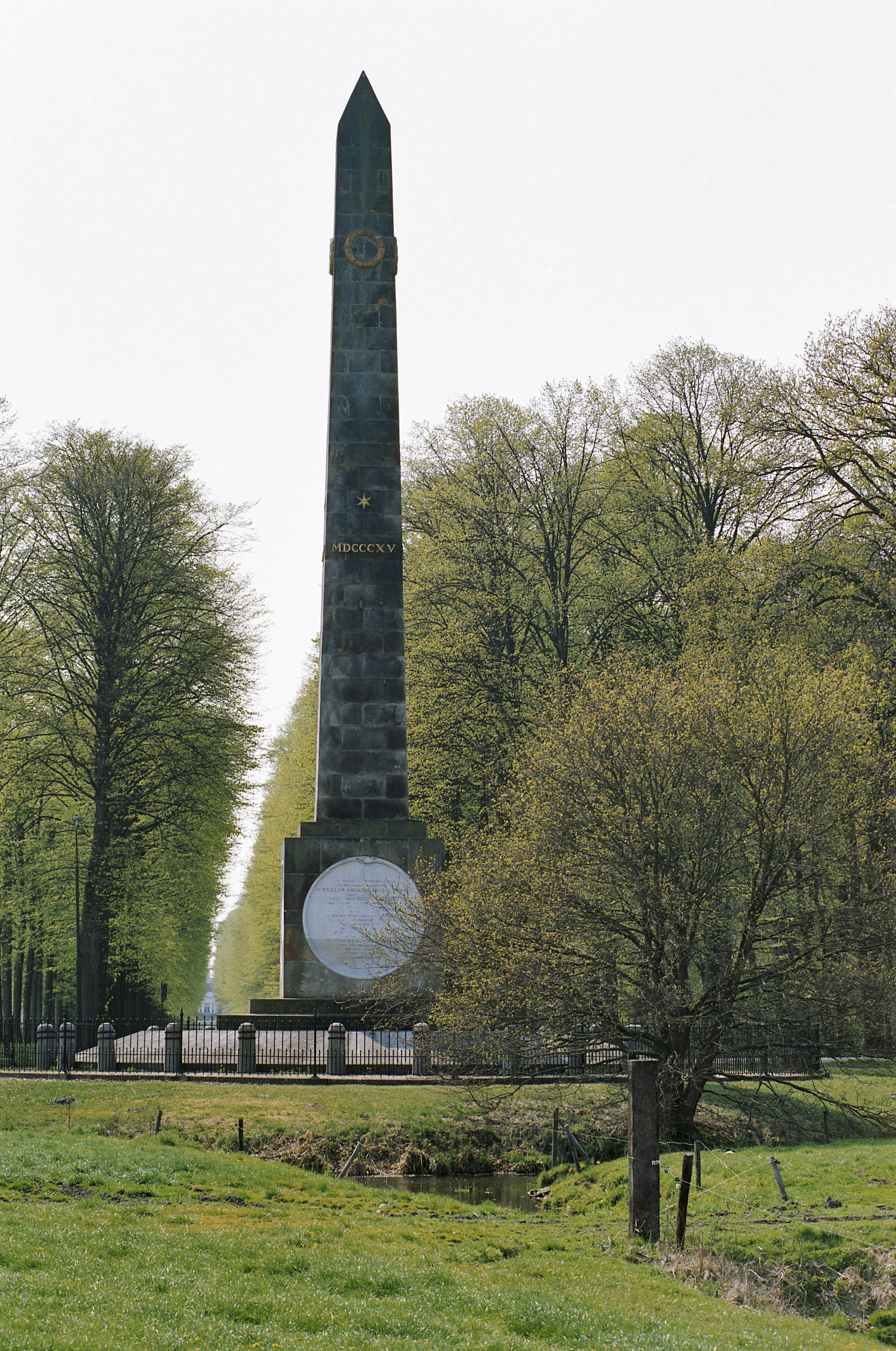
Monument erected in remembrance of the battle

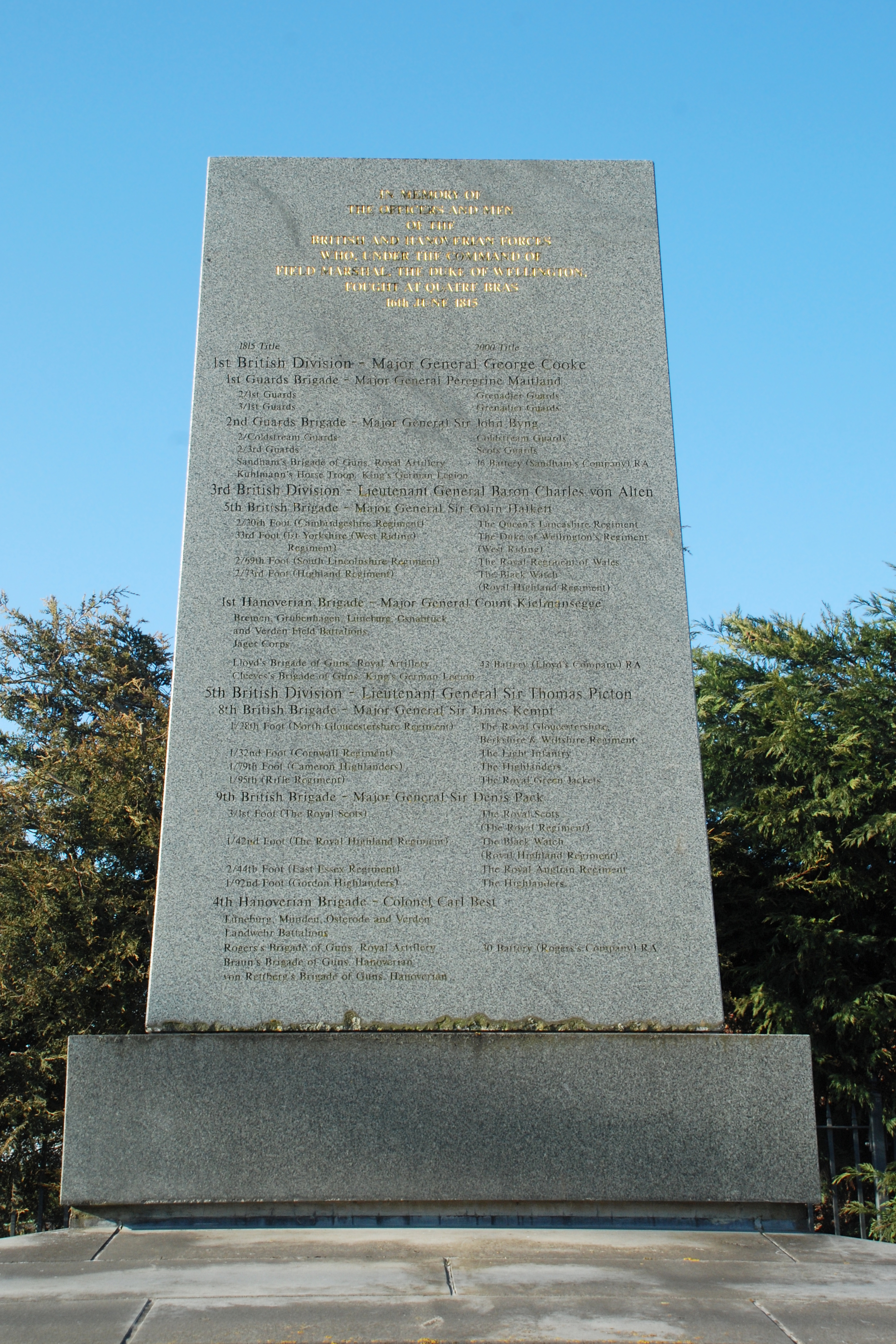
Monument to the British and Hanoverian Troops.

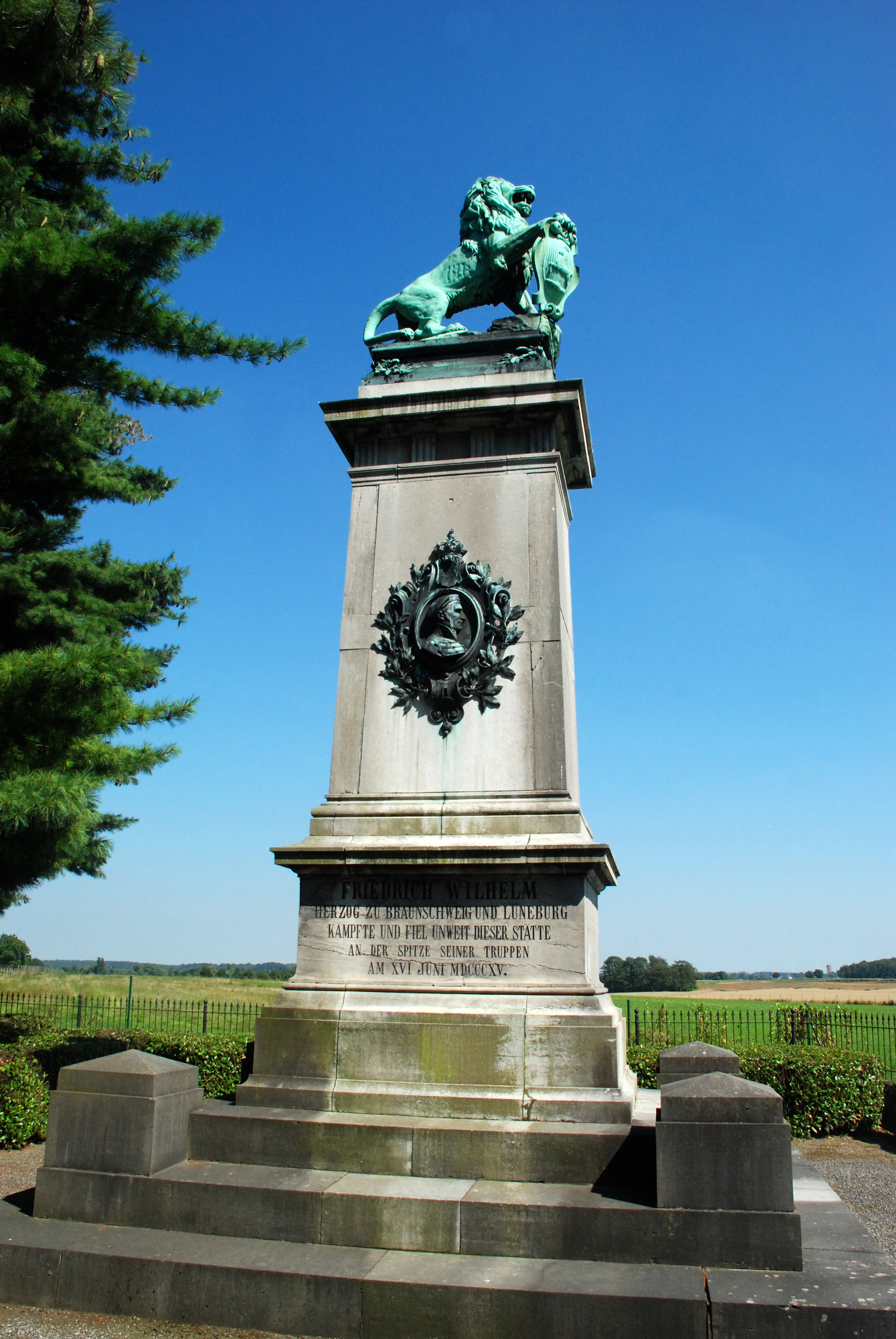
Brunswick Monument.

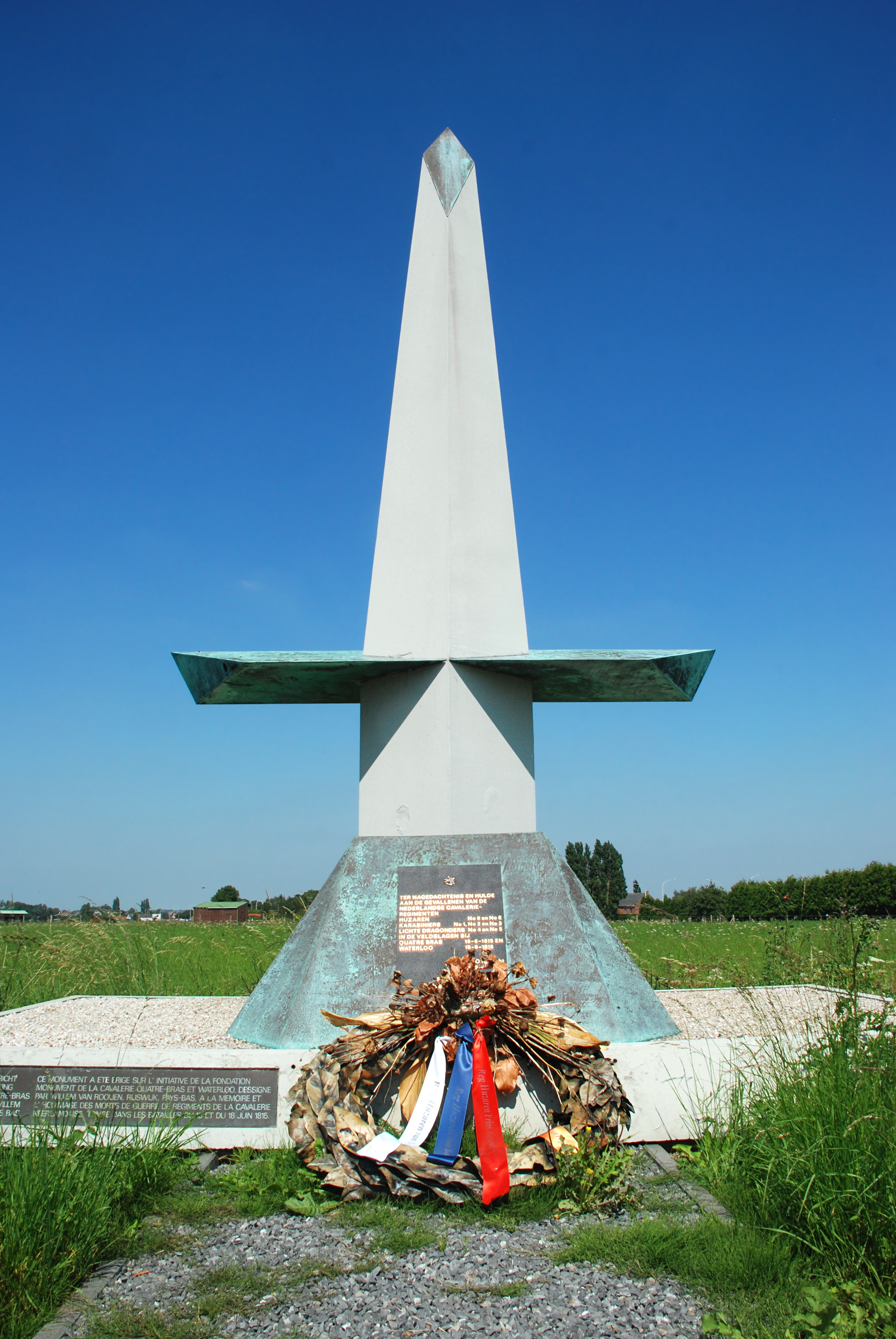
Monument to the Dutch Cavalry regiments.

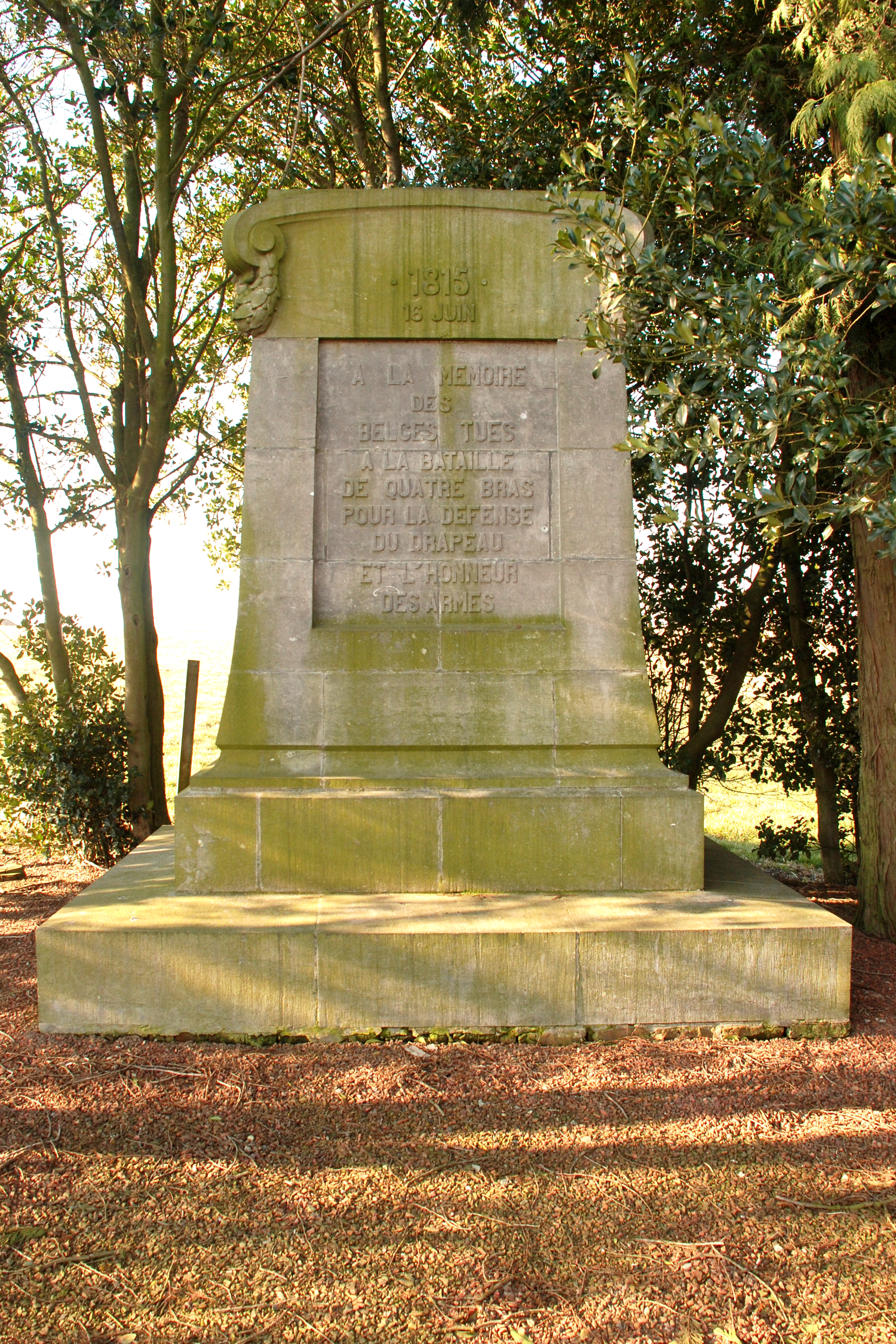
Monument to the Belgians.

== See also ==
- Order of battle of the Battle of Quatre Bras
- List of Napoleonic battles

== Notes ==
Preceded by Siege of Gaeta (1815)	Napoleonic Wars; Battle of Quatre Bras	Succeeded by Battle of Ligny
