= Robert Macara =

British Army officer

Lieutenant-Colonel Sir Robert Macara KCB (1759 – 16 June 1815) was a British Army officer who fought in the Peninsular War and was killed at the Battle of Quatre Bras during the Waterloo Campaign.

== Life ==
Originally trained as a surgeon by the East India Company, in 1802 he purchased a captaincy in the 42nd Regiment of Foot with the money he had saved during his time in India. He was promoted to major on 14 November 1805 and brevet lieutenant-colonel on 1 January 1812. Although the 2nd Battalion of his regiment were part of the 1808 Walcheren Campaign in Holland, he remained in Ireland and did not see active service until April 1812 at the age of 53.

During the Peninsular War, Macara was present at the battles of Salamanca, Burgos, the Pyrenees, the Nivelle, the Nive, Orthes and Toulouse where he was severely wounded. For his service he received the Gold Medal and was made a Knight Commander of the Order of the Bath (KCB).

== Death ==
On the 16 June 1815 at the Battle of Quatre Bras, Macara was wounded during an engagement and as he was carried from the field he was taken prisoner by a party of French soldiers. His decorations gave him away as an officer of rank and he was killed on the spot. The last three verses of a contemporary poem commemorate his death:

"Here the Goddess ceased her lay;

Weak, her wings refused to fly; -
Faint, her voice forbore to say
How Macara dared to die.
Be it, then, to friendship giv'n
Such a warrior's name to save,
While 'tis borne on breeze of heav'n
That he found a soldier's grave.
By unequal hosts oppos'd,
Still he proved his valour true;
For his bright career was clos'd

On the plains of Waterloo!"

The Kinrara Waterloo Cairn in Alvie, Scotland commemorates Macara and other Scottish soldiers who were killed during the Waterloo Campaign.
