= Van Bylandt's brigade =

1815 Anglo-allied army unit of Dutch nationality

Van Bylandt's brigade (also Bylandt's brigade, or Brigade-Van Bylandt) is the nickname, used in military historiography for the 1st brigade of the 2nd Netherlands division of the Mobile Army of the United Kingdom of the Netherlands, a Dutch and Belgian infantry brigade led by Major General Willem Frederik Graaf van Bylandt which fought in the Waterloo Campaign (1815).

== Formation ==
On 25 March 1815 the mobile army of the Kingdom of the Netherlands received its organizational details. The infantry of the army was divided into three divisions, each of them divided into two brigades. The 1st division was commanded by General Stedman, the 3rd by General Chassé. The 2nd Division was to be commanded by General Perponcher, who was then Minister of the Netherlands in Berlin. His first brigade was placed under the orders of Colonel Van Bylandt. The brigade was the 1st Brigade of the 2nd Netherlands Division (General Perponcher) of the Anglo-allied I Corps (Prince of Orange's) in the Duke of Wellington's Anglo-allied army. On 8 April 1815 Colonel Van Zuylen was appointed chief of staff.

At the start of the Waterloo Campaign, the Brigade as part of the I Corps was cantoned to the south-east of Brussels. The brigade consisted of:

- 27th Light Battalion (Bataljon Jagers, 550 men), commanded by Lieutenant Colonel J.W. Grunebosch
- Dutch 7th Infantry Battalion (701 men), commanded by Lieutenant Colonel F.C. van den Sande
- Dutch 5th National Militia Battalion (220 men), commanded by Lieutenant Colonel J.J.Westenberg
- Dutch 7th National Militia Battalion (675 men), commanded by Lieutenant Colonel H. Singendonck
- Dutch 8th National Militia Battalion (566 men), commanded by Lieutenant Colonel W.A. de Jongh.

== Waterloo Campaign ==
The brigade fought in both the Battle of Quatre Bras and the Battle of Waterloo in June 1815 against the French Army of the North commanded by Napoleon Bonaparte.

On 15 June Nassau units of the 2nd Brigade were engaged by the vanguard of the French army's left wing; which developed into the Battle of Quatre Bras where Van Bylandt's brigade played a major role during the morning and early afternoon of 16 June 1815, before the arrival of Allied forces, when they were facing the French alone. Especially the 27th Jagers and the 5th National Militia bore the brunt of the attack after 2 pm of the divisions of Bachelu and Foy under the direction of general Reille toward the Gemioncourt farm (which changed hands several times during the battle). As a consequence of their prolonged involvement in combat, the van Bylandt Brigade ended the engagement as the most battered and decimated unit among the Allies.

After the battle the Anglo-allied army deployed at the escarpment near Mont-Saint-Jean. Van Bylandt's brigade was initially placed on Wellington's orders in front of Thomas Picton's division in an advanced position at the downward slope of the escarpment. However, the position was untenable as it left the brigade exposed to French artillery fire. As such, the commander of the 2nd Netherlands Division, general Perponcher, ordered Van Bylandt to reposition his brigade behind the crest of the hill (where Picton's division was) 11 am, a manoeuvre which was completed around noon. (Note: De Bas claims that this fact has escaped William Siborne, and on his authority many later Anglophone historians, which has led to many erroneous narratives, about "grievous losses" Van Bylandt's troops would have suffered if they had remained in their exposed position, due to the ensuing French artillery bombardment of the position which started around 1 30 pm.). The new disposition of the brigade was in front of the interval between the brigades of Kempt and Pack, with the 27th Jagers on the right, the 7th battalion of the line and the 7th National Militia in the middle, and the 8th National Militia on the left, while the depleted 5th National Militia was placed behind them in reserve. So the brigade was no more exposed to the French artillery bombardment that commenced around 1 h 30 pm and were in good fighting order when the Corps of d'Erlon commenced his attack on their position at 2 pm. Of this Corps, the division of Donzelot threw itself at the position taken by Bylandt's brigade, bypassing the farm of La Haye Sainte. The brigade's troops were arrayed in two ranks, pouring volley fire into the advancing French troops. But it was too weak to make too much of an impression. This enabled the French to break through the line of the brigade, forcing it to retreat to the position of the 5th National Militia. At this time the British brigades of Pack and Kempt, who formed the Allies' second echelon, counter-attacked the flanks of the French column, soon joined by the Dutch troops that were rallied by colonel Van Zuylen. They succeeded in driving the French back to the hollow road along the crest of the escarpment. Then the Allied cavalry massacred them, putting an end to this part of the battle. Van Bylandt, van Zuylen and most of the division's commanders were wounded and the eventual counterattack was executed under the command of Captain Bast.

On the part of Wellington it may have been legitimate to be wary of the loyalty of the Belgian and Dutch troops, (Note: He had received an anonymous memo about the trustworthiness of Dutch and Belgian generals before the Campaign that was very negative.) as some had fought in the French army, and the chief of the Dutch general staff, the Swiss general Rebecque had blocked a mistaken order, based on sloppy staff work, from Wellington to abandon Quatre Bras in the evening of 15 June (which Wellington in the morning of 16 June found justified).

Many British historians and authors have repeatedly criticized the Dutch, Belgian and German troops for their, in comparison to the British contingents, allegedly low morale, shameful conduct in combat and even cowardice, generally based on the reports of British officers, such as Kennedy. The alleged retreat of parts of Van Bylandt's brigade upon the French infantry attack at La Haye Sainte has been particularly condemned. However authors from other backgrounds have concluded, that with regard to their already weakened condition, Wellington's mistrust and the local isolation and exposure, these men fought indeed valiantly. Napoleon himself had observed...that heroic determination of the Prince of Orange as to be an essential force of conquest.

After the Battle of Waterloo the Allied army marched on Paris, where Emperor Bonaparte would eventually abdicate which finally ended a 25-year period of war.

== Sources ==
- Atkinson, C.T. (20 August 2018). A History of Germany 1715-1815. Taylor & Francis. ISBN 978-0-429-86831-3.
- Baker-Smith, Veronica (19 October 2015). Wellington's Hidden Heroes: The Dutch and the Belgians at Waterloo. Casemate Publishers (Ignition). ISBN 978-1-61200-333-7.
- Barbero, Allesandro (2006), The Battle: A new history of Waterloo, Walker & Company.
- Bas, F. de; De T'Serclaes de Wommersom, J. (1908). La campagne de 1815 aux Pays-Bas d'après les rapports officiels néerlandais. Tome I : Quatre-Bras (in French). Paris: Librairie Plon..
- Bas, F. de; De T'Serclaes de Wommersom, J. (1908). La campagne de 1815 aux Pays-Bas d'après les rapports officiels néerlandais. Tome II : Waterloo (in French). Paris: Librairie Plon.
- Boulder, Demetrius C. (2005), The Belgians at Waterloo.
- Haythornthwaite, Philip (18 October 2007). The Waterloo Armies: Men, Organization and Tactics. Pen and Sword. ISBN 978-1-84415-599-6.
- Hussey, John (12 June 2017). Waterloo: The Campaign of 1815, Volume I: From Elba to Ligny and Quatre Bras. Greenhill Books. ISBN 978-1-78438-198-1.
- Montholon, Charles-Tristan comte de (1847). History of the Captivity of Napoleon at St. Helena. Carey and Hart.
- Muilwijk, Erwin (2012), 1815 – From mobilisation to war, Souvereign House Books, Bleiswijk.
- Muilwijk, Erwin (2013), Quatre Bras – Perponcher's gamble', Souvereign House Books, Bleiswijk.
- Muilwijk, Erwin (2014), Standing firm at Waterloo, Souvereign House Books, Bleiswijk.
- Muir, Rory. Britain and the Defeat of Napoleon, 1807-1815. Yale University Press. ISBN 0-300-14361-3.
- Op de Beeck, Johan (2013), Waterloo – De laatste 100 dagen van Napoleon, Manteau Uitgeverij.
- Pawly, Ronald (2001), Wellington's Belgian allies, Osprey Publishing.
- Pawly, Ronald (2002), Wellington's Dutch allies 1815, Osprey Publishing.
- Pawly, Ronald (20 March 2012). Wellington's Belgian Allies 1815. Bloomsbury Publishing. ISBN 978-1-78096-564-2.
- Summerville, Christopher J. (2007). Who was who at Waterloo: A Biography of the Battle. Longman. ISBN 978-0-582-78405-5.
- White, Alasdair. "The Road to Waterloo: a concise history of the 1815 campaign". La Patience.
