= Quatre Bras =

Hamlet in Genappe, Walloon Brabant, Belgium

Coordinates: 50°34′17″N 4°27′12″E

Quatre Bras ([kat.ʁə bʁɑ], French for crossroads; literally "four arms") is a hamlet in the municipality of Genappe, Wallonia, Belgium. It lies on the crossroad of the Charleroi–Brussels road (currently named N5) and the Nivelles–Namur road south of Genappe.

On 16 June 1815, near the crossroads of Quatre Bras, the Battle of Quatre Bras (part of the Waterloo Campaign) was fought between contingents of the Anglo-Allied army and the left wing of the French Army. There are several monuments to the battle at Quatre Bras.

Monuments in Quatre Bras

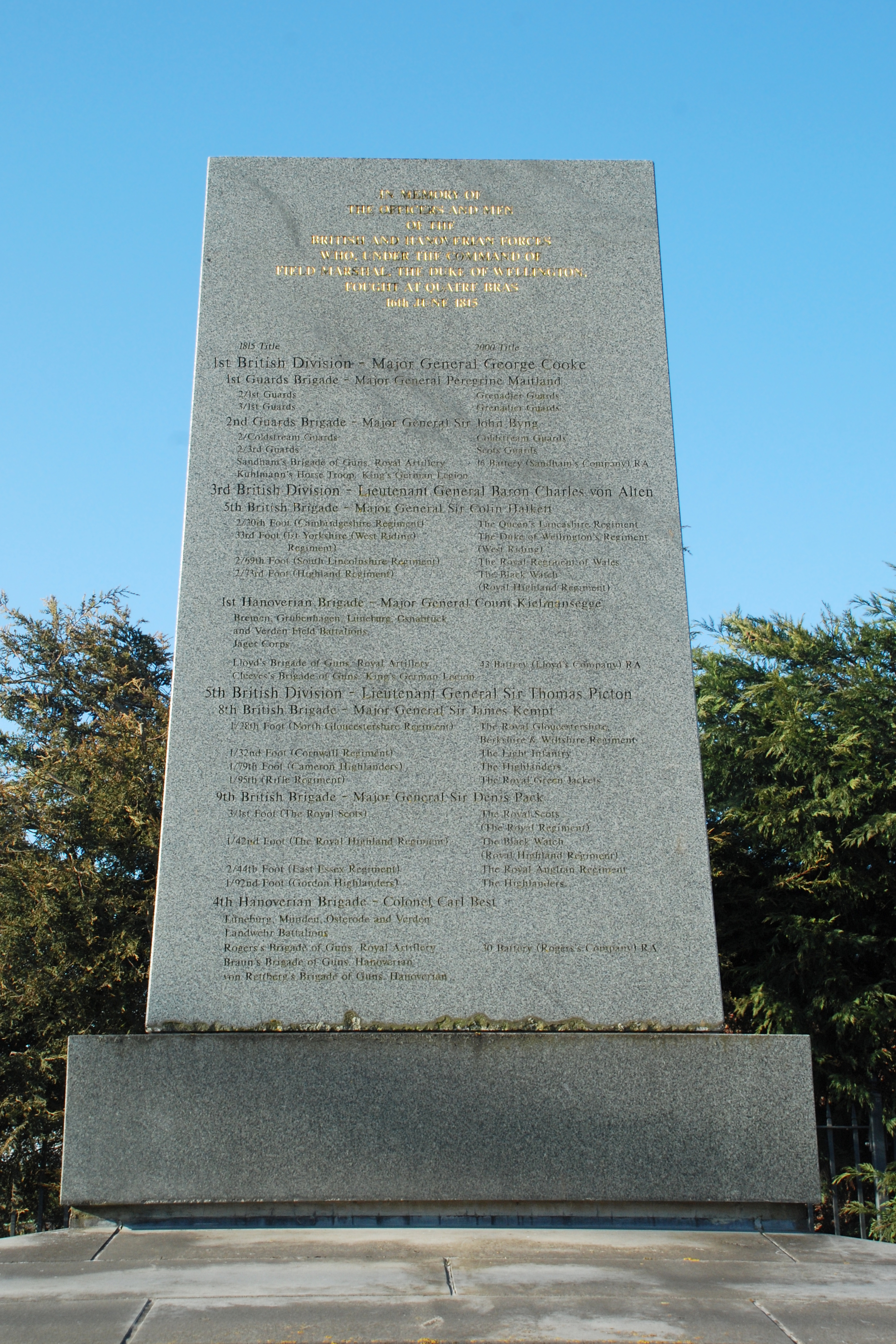
Monument to the British and Hanoverian Troops.

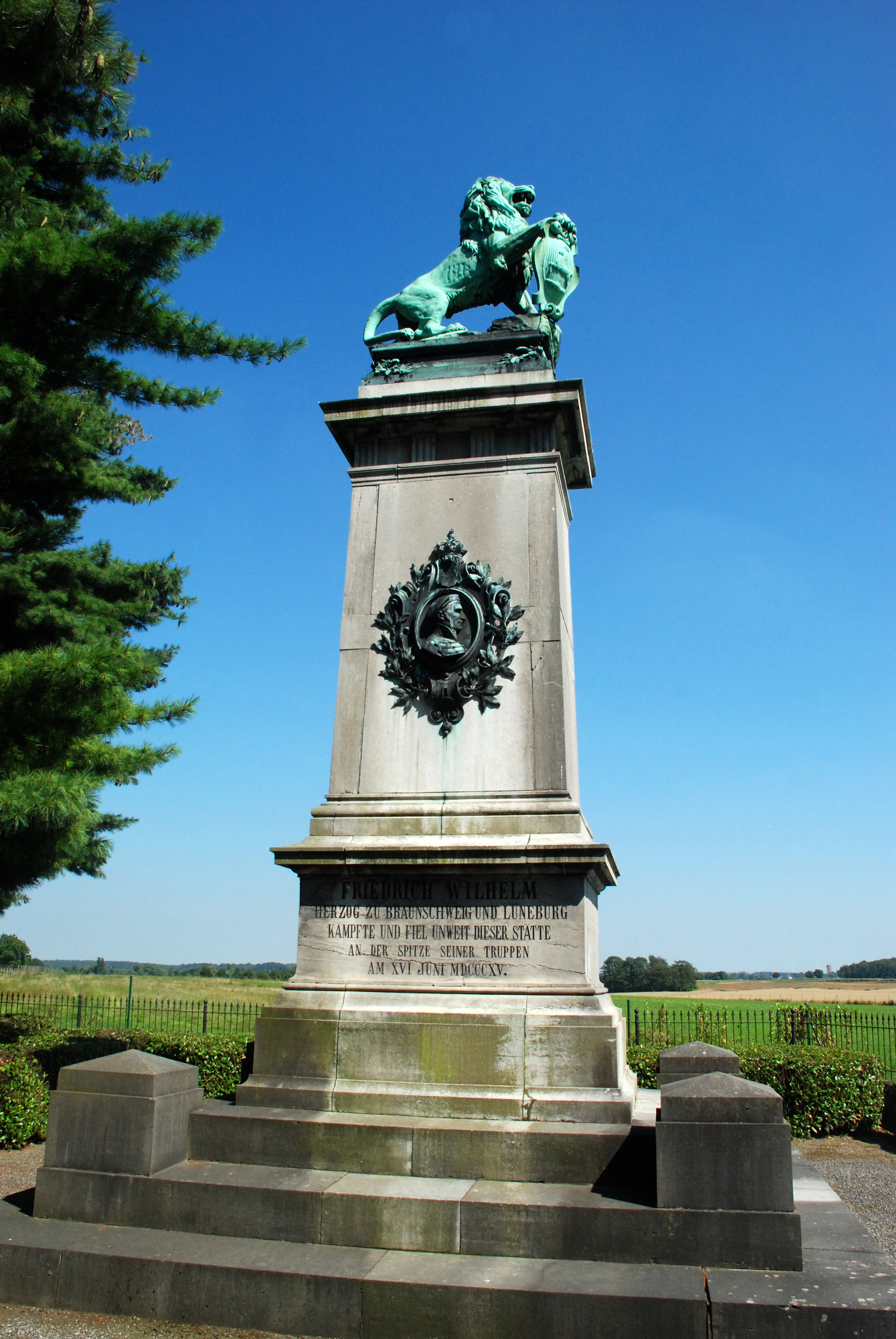
Brunswick Monument.

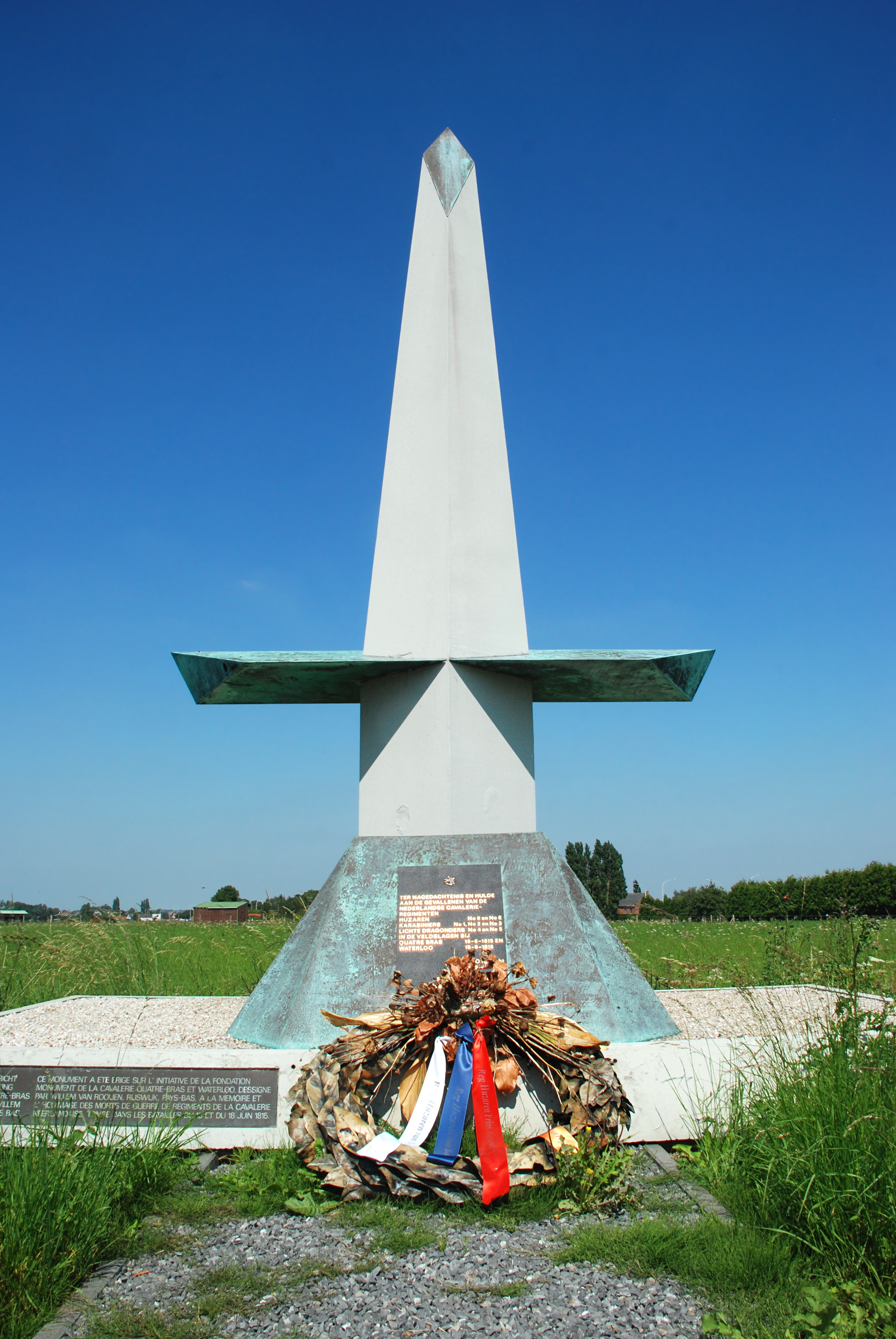
Monument to the Dutch Cavalry regiments.

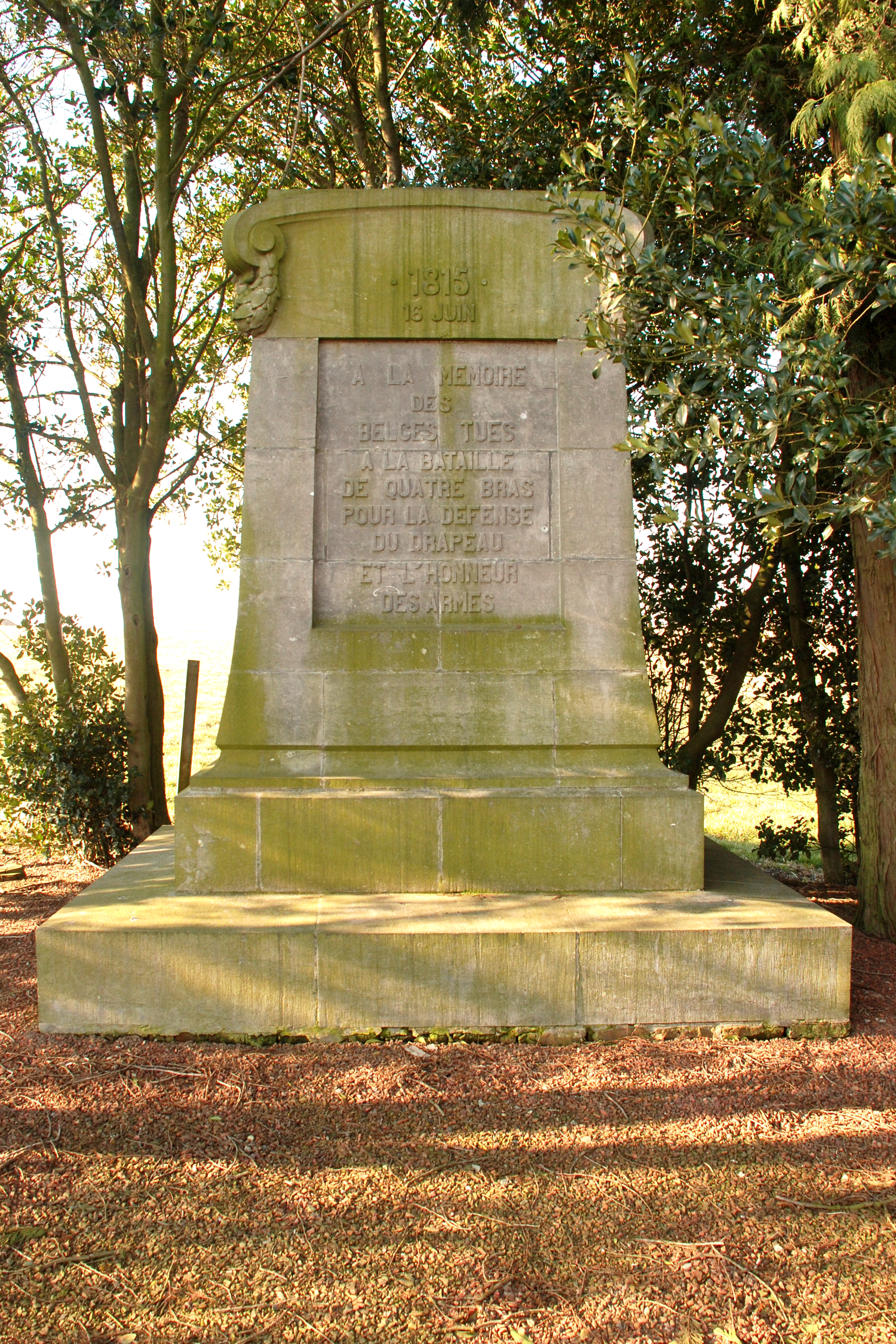
Monument to the Belgians.
