= Greg Hamerton =

South African writer

Greg Hamerton (born in Cape Town in 1973) is a South African fantasy novelist and extreme sports writer.

== Biography ==
Greg Hamerton was educated early at a Waldorf school (based on the Rudolf Steiner system). He matriculated from South African College Schools (SACS) in 1991 and completed a Bachelor of Commerce degree at the University of Cape Town in 1994. He was qualified as a paragliding instructor in 1992, and was Chief Instructor of an active paragliding school in Cape Town.

In 1997, Hamerton moved to the UK to teach paragliding and compete on the Paragliding World Cup circuit. Upon returning to South Africa, he began to write sport articles for various magazines, mostly to the international free-flying magazine Cross Country.

He also worked at the London Academy of Music and Dramatic Art (2008–2010).

In 2020, he formed Fly With Greg to offer a unique system of pilot training.

== Writing ==
Hamerton's first novel, Beyond The Invisible, was published in 1998 by Eternity Press. This was followed by a non-fiction guidebook for Paragliding in South Africa (1999) titled The Fresh Air Site Guide. His epic fantasy series, The Tale of the Lifesong, began with The Riddler's Gift (2007) and continued with Second Sight (2010). He published another paragliding guidebook Best Flying Sites of the Alps in 2011.

Hamerton's work contains elements of magical realism, and has a vivid visual style. He mentioned in an interview with Eternity Press that his writing comes to him visually. His influences include J.R.R. Tolkien, Robert Jordan, Terry Goodkind, Stephen Donaldson and Robin Hobb, and Terry Pratchett.

In a 2007 interview with Something Wicked, he commented on his motivation to write: "For me it's a very personal joy. I really enjoy being in the mental state one reaches when writing creatively. It's a kind of meditation, and one I find invigorating. It feels that I'm wiser when writing than in the normal everyday world."

== Paragliding ==
He began flying in 1992 and took part in world record attempts in 1994 and 2007 in the X-SA Challenge. He flew in the Paragliding World Cup circuit in 1997. His passion for open-distance cross-country flying has taken him to many countries around the world and seen him set site records in South Africa. His experience in exploration and bivouac flying led to the filming of Fresh Air Riders (2000), a collaboration with South African Hang-gliding Champion Johan Anderson, directed by extreme sports documentary filmmaker Nic Good of the Fresh Air Crew. This was followed by his directorial debut The Journey produced by Eternity Press in 2008.

== Bibliography ==
- Beyond the Invisible - Flying from fear to freedom. (Literary novel. English. Published by Eternity Press, 1998). ISBN 978-1920436117

Written in the first-person narrative style of Richard Bach, this loosely autobiographical story blends descriptive imagery of flying paragliders with meditations on the metaphysics of dealing with fear. A recurrent theme in this work is the enervating atmosphere of modern city life contrasted with the freedom of the wilderness tramp. Although there seem to be many references to real experiences, the reader is confronted with passages that tend towards the fantastical, but in the context of the story they serve to demonstrate a shift of perception. As a piece of fiction dealing with paragliding it is considered rare (Joe Schofield, Skywings Magazine review).

- Fresh Air Site Guide - Paragliding and Hangliding in South Africa. (Guidebook. Non-fiction. English, German. Published by Eternity Press, 1999–2007).

A directory of flying sites throughout Southern Africa, written from the author's personal experience as an instructor. Greg Hamerton travelled extensively to collect information and photographs before compiling this book in 1999. It is updated regularly, and the 5th edition (2007) was translated into German.

- The Riddler's Gift - First Tale of The Lifesong. (Fantasy fiction. English. Published by Eternity Press, June 2007).
- The Riddler's Gift Audiobook - as read by the author. (Fantasy fiction. English. Published by Eternity Press, August 2007).
- The Journey - a flying story (DVD). (Short adventure/philosophical film, 23 minutes. English. Directed and Produced by Greg Hamerton. Published by Eternity Press, January 2008).
- Second Sight - Second Tale of The Lifesong. (Fantasy fiction. English. Published by Eternity Press, August 2010).
