= Brye =

Brye Briye (Walloon)
- Village
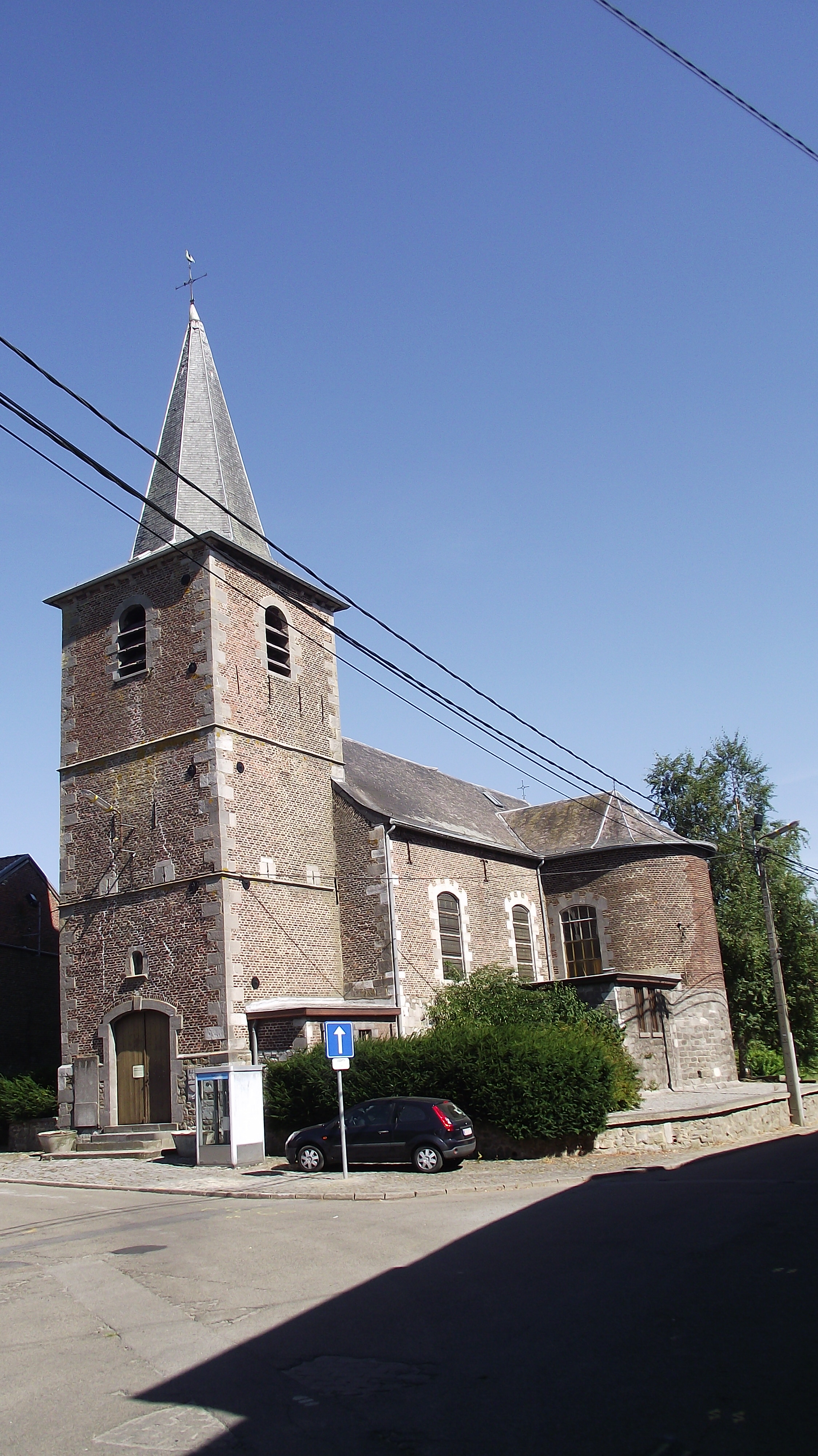
- The church of Saint-Pierre, Brye.

- Location within Belgium
- Coordinates: 50°31′26.78″N 4°33′23.96″E
- Country: Belgium
- Region: Wallonia
- Province: Hainaut
- Municipality: Fleurus
- Time zone: UTC+1 (CET)

Brye (Walloon: Briye) is a village of Wallonia and a district of the municipality of Fleurus, located in the province of Hainaut, arrondissement of Charleroi, Belgium. Its post code is 6222, and telephone zone code is 071.

Brye was its own municipality until the fusion of the Belgian municipalities in 1977, when it merged with Fleurus.

== History ==
On 16 June 1815 Brye and the heights nearby, along with a string of other villages, were occupied by the Prussian army commanded by Gebhard von Blücher and defended against the French Army of the North commanded by Napoleon Bonaparte at the Battle of Ligny. On the heights—the highest point of the whole position—stood the Windmill of Buss which was used by Blücher and his staff as an observation point. (Note: The windmill of Bussy, also called the windmill of Brye, was located just to the south of the cross roads of Rue Joseph Scohy, Rue de Sombreffe and Rue de Tige at 50°31′17.78″N 4°33′44.72″E)It was here at around about 13:00 that Blücher, Wellington and their staffs held their conference. After the centre of the Prussian lines were broken by the French, a Prussians rearguard put up a stout resistance in Brye.
