= John Miller Hamerton =

British Army general

General John Millett Hamerton CB (1778 – 27 January 1855) was a British Army officer who fought in various overseas campaigns including the Peninsular War and the Waterloo Campaign.

== Career ==
He joined the 44th Regiment of Foot as an ensign on 31 October 1792, and was promoted to lieutenant on 31 January 1794. He served under the command of the Duke of York in the Flanders Campaign in 1794 then embarked for the West Indies late in 1795, under the command of Sir Ralph Abercromby, and assisted at the capture of the island of St. Lucia in 1796. Appointed captain on 28 October 1796, the following year he returned to England with the regiment, and in October 1798 embarked for Gibraltar, where he continued until the expedition to Egypt.

He returned to England in 1802 and was appointed major in the 44th on 15 June 1804 and served in Guernsey, Malta, and Sicily. He was appointed brevet lieutenant-colonel on 4 June 1811. He served in Spain and commanded the 1st Battalion of the 44th Regiment. He was appointed lieutenant-colonel of that corps on 31 March 1814. He served also in the Netherlands and France, where he commanded the 2nd battalion of his regiment.

At the Battle of Waterloo he particularly distinguished himself in checking a sudden charge of French lancers and was afterwards left for dead on the field of battle, having received several severe wounds in the head and thigh. A non-commissioned officer, Sergeant Ryan, brought his injured and unconscious commander to the surgeons. After a slow recovery he returned home and shortly afterwards was nominated a Companion of the Bath as well as given the Waterloo Medal. On the reduction of the 2nd Battalion on 24 January 1816 he was placed on half pay.

== Family ==
Hamerton married Helena, daughter of J. Sullivan and the couple had the following issue:

- John
- Albert
- Matthew (b. 1830), educated at Trinity College, Dublin, he became Lord of the Manor of Orchardstown on his father's death.
- Charlotte
- Susannah
- Georgiana

== Death ==
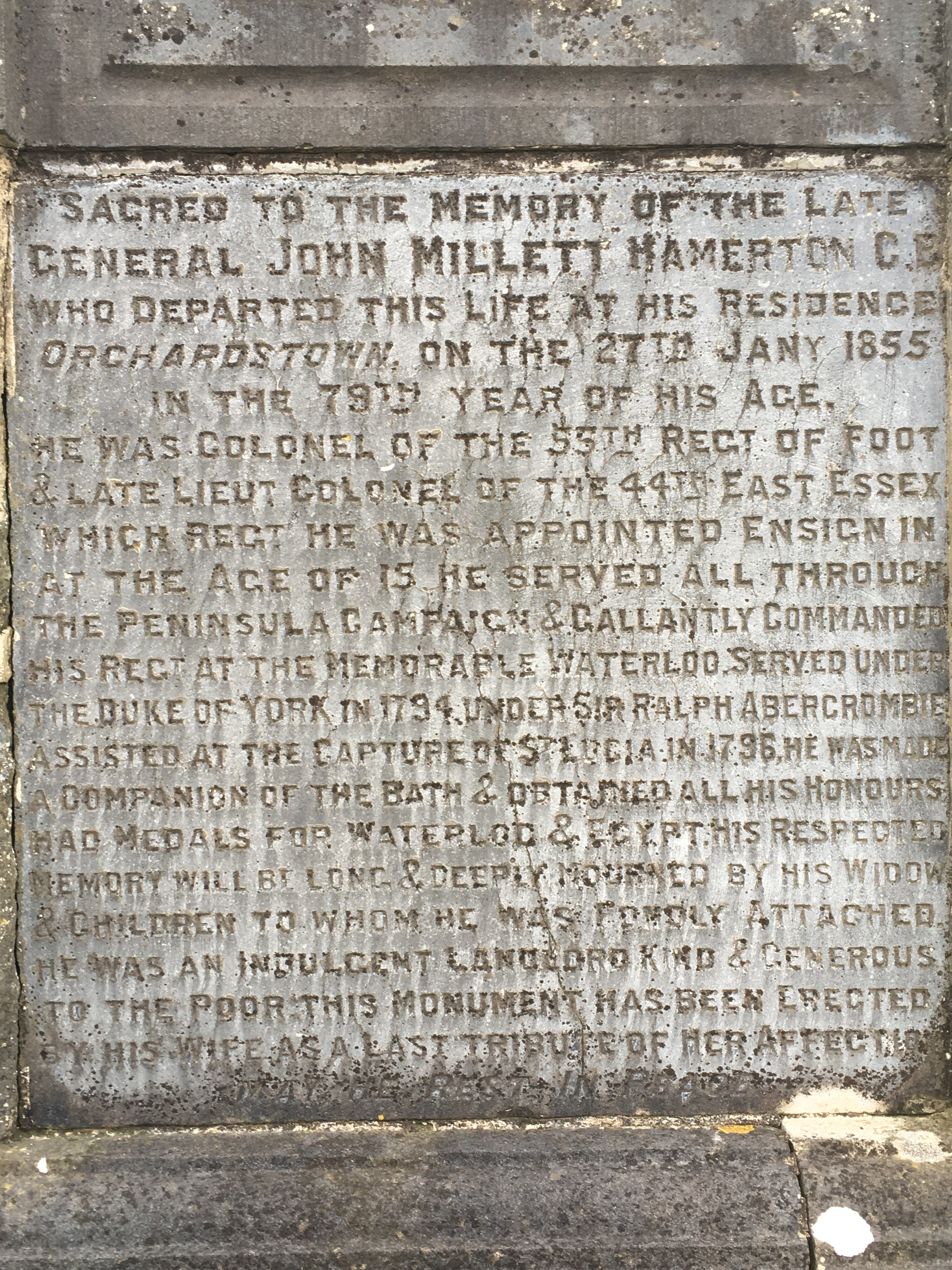

He died on 27 January 1855 at Orchardstown House, near Clonmel, Ireland after a short illness and was interred in the family vault at Rathronan.
