= Preobrazhensky Life Guards Regiment =

Imperial Russian infantry unit

Preobrazhensky Lifeguard Regiment
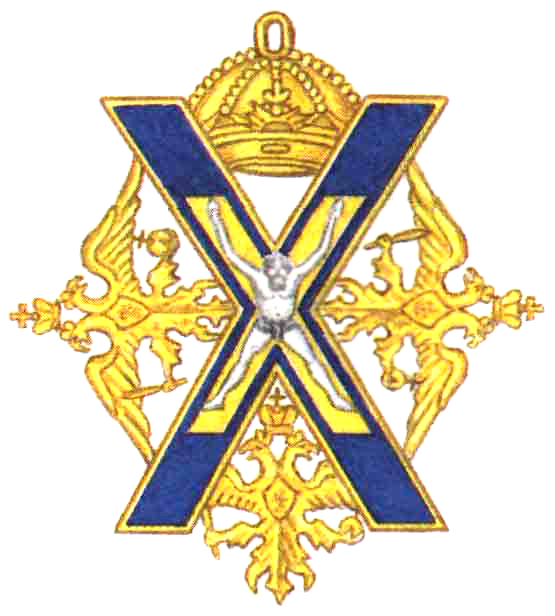
- Badge of the regiment
- Active: 1683–1917
- Country: Tsardom of Russia; Russian Empire
- Branch: Imperial Russian Army; Russian Army (1917)
- Type: Infantry
- Role: Imperial guard
- Size: Regiment
- Part of: 1st Guards Infantry Division, Guards Corps
- Garrison/HQ: Saint Petersburg

Commanders
- Colonel-in-Chief: Emperor of Russia

Insignia
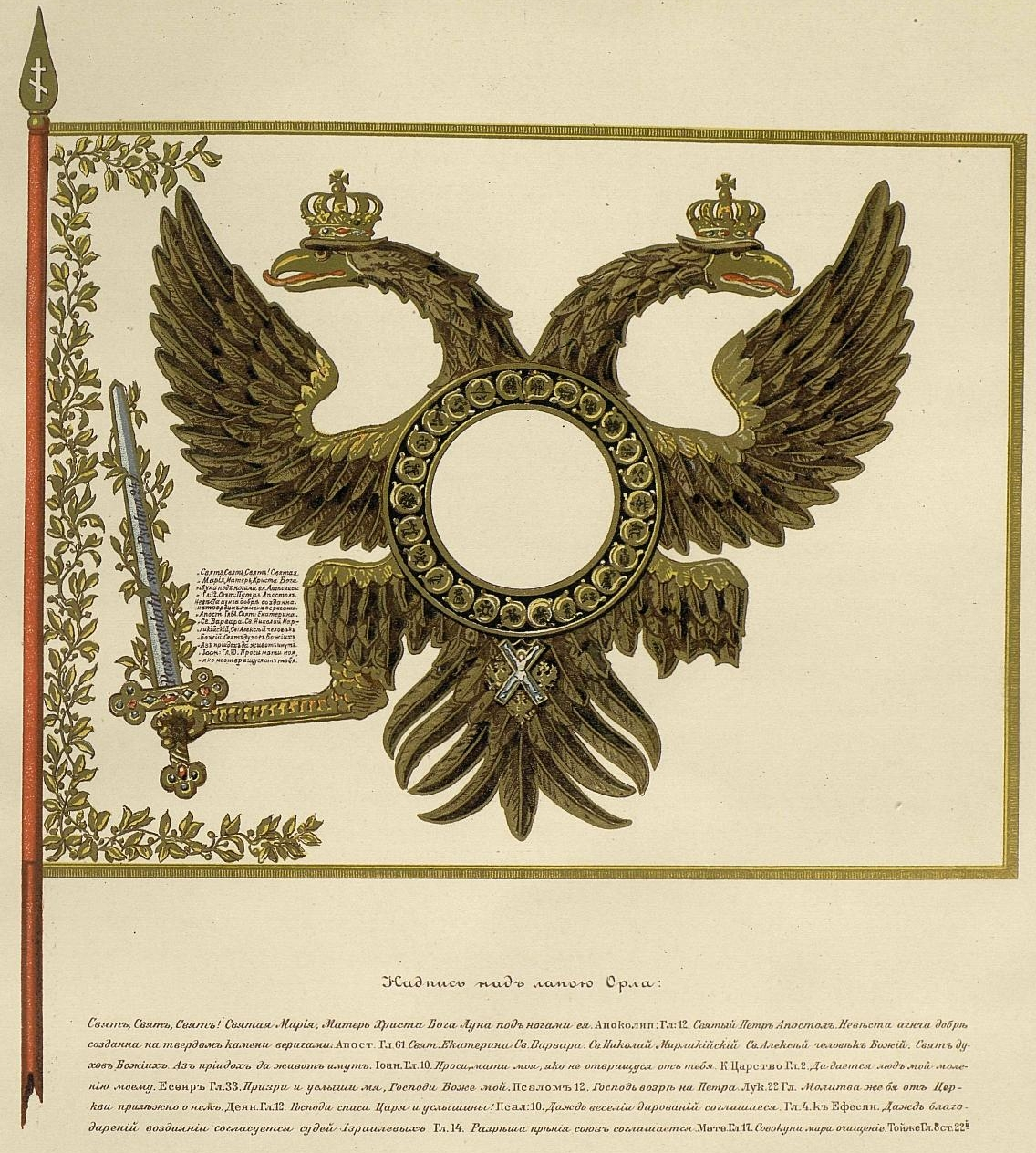
- Banner of the regiment

The Preobrazhensky Life-Guards Regiment (Note: Literally "Transfiguration Life-Guards Regiment") (Russian: Преображенский лейб-гвардии полк, romanized: Preobrazhensky leyb-gvardii polk) was a regiment of the Imperial Guard of the Imperial Russian Army from 1683 to 1917.

The Preobrazhensky Regiment was one of the oldest infantry regiments in Imperial Russia, along with the Semyonovsky Regiment. Among the two, the Preobrazhensky Regiment was the first to be formally established by Peter the Great from his so-called "toy army" in 1690, and became part of the Western-style regiments in the Russian armed forces. The regiment distinguished itself in battle several times during his reign in the wars against Sweden and the Ottoman Empire.

Along with the Semyonovsky Regiment, the Preobrazhensky Regiment formed the 1st Brigade (known as "Peter's Brigade") of the 1st Guards Infantry Division stationed on the Fontanka in Saint Petersburg. It served in several campaigns during World War I and was disbanded shortly before the October Revolution in 1917 by its last commander, though it was not officially dissolved until May 1918.

The Preobrazhensky Regiment was recreated in 2013 as the 154th Preobrazhensky Independent Commandant's Regiment, the official honor guard regiment of the Russian Armed Forces, stationed in Moscow.

== History ==
=== Founding ===
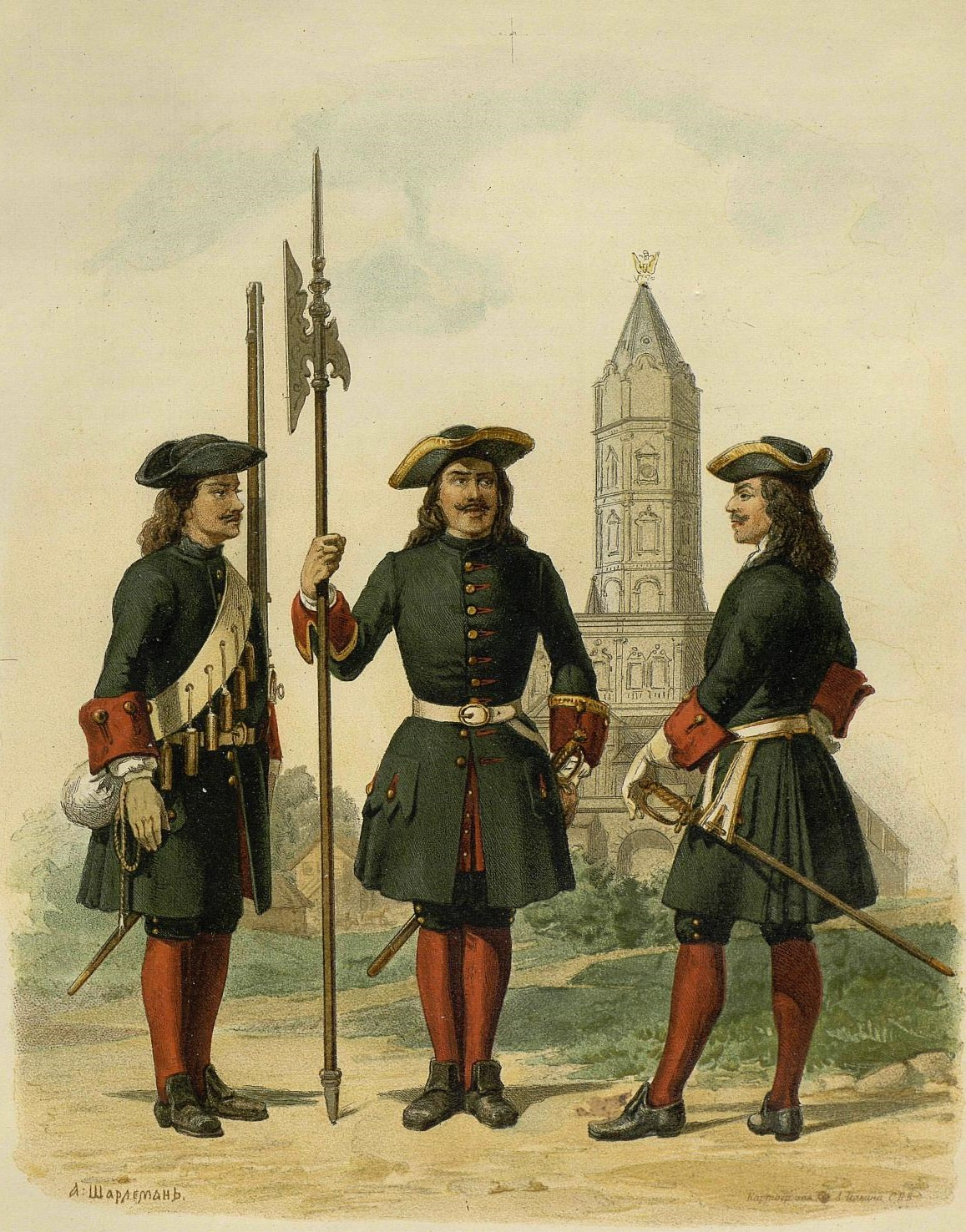
A private, sergeant, and officer of the regiment, 1690s

The Preobrazhensky Regiment was officially founded in 1690 by Tsar Peter I, and was named after the village where its barracks were located, Preobrazhenskoye, which is now a district of Moscow. But the regiment traces its origins to 2 June [O.S. 26 May] 1683, when Peter assembled the so-called toy army of his friends, who were the sons of the Russian nobility, where they would play war, which was Peter's favorite game in his childhood. In January 1683 Peter ordered from the government uniforms, banners, and wooden cannons for his toy army, and the cannons were replaced with real ones in June 1683. Eventually the regiment expanded and Preobrazhenskoye turned into a military camp. Because they ran out of room at the original barracks, a second one was established in the village of Semyonovskoye (now in Moscow's Sokolniki District).

Both the Preobrazhensky Regiment and the Semyonovsky Regiment had about 300 soldiers organized as infantry, cavalry, and artillery, and their organization and training became no different from the regular army (the Streltsy). They also received Western-style uniforms, which were distinguished by dark green coats for the Preobrazhensky and blue for the Semyonovsky. Peter started himself off at the lowest rank of drummer boy, refusing to take the highest rank of colonel, and lived in the same conditions, with the same work load, as the other members of the regiment. He also brought foreign officers to teach the regiments military skills, and the senior ranks of both regiments consisted of foreigners, while the sergeants and enlisted soldiers were Russian. In the 1690s the two regiments had about 600 soldiers between them, making them a small fraction of the total Russian army, and they participated in large scale exercises together with the Streltsy. These exercises sometimes also had real casualties, and expanded from games by a few hundred boys to real military drills involving 30,000 men.

=== Later history ===
In the summer of 1695 Tsar Peter made the decision to resume Russia's war against the Ottoman Empire, which had started years earlier. His motivations included conquering a warm water port on the Sea of Azov and to test his new army, but it was also in response to the continued Muslim Tatar slave raids into Russian territory from Crimea and the coast of the Black Sea. The king of Poland, Jan Sobieski, also threatened to end his alliance with Peter if Russia did not take action against Turkey. The Azov campaigns of 1695–96 involved the Preobrazhensky Regiment, the Semyonovsky Regiment and other Western-style units. The first siege of the fortress of Azov failed, but the second attack was a success. Members of the Preobrazhensky Regiment were chosen to serve as marines on the fleet of galleys that Peter had built for the campaign.

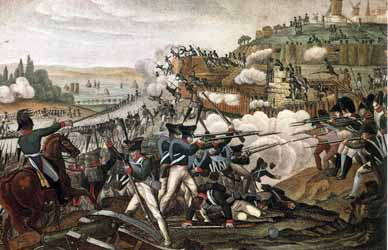
Preobrazhensky Regiment fighting the Battle of Paris, 30 March 1814, with Montmartre in the background

The Preobrazhensky Regiment distinguished itself during the Great Northern War of 1700–1721, the Patriotic War of 1812, and the Russo-Turkish War of 1877–1878.

The regiment operated as the body-guard of the Grand Duchess Yekaterina Alekseevna as well as the main supporter of her bloodless 1762 coup against her husband Emperor Peter III; having become Empress Catherine II (r. 1762–1796) she declared the Preobrazhensky highest in the order of military precedence from 14 July 1762.

In spite of its distinguished record, part of one battalion of the regiment mutinied in June 1906, at a time of general unrest in the Russian Empire. The mutiny was quickly suppressed and 190 soldiers sentenced to service in disciplinary battalions.

=== World War I ===
When the Kerensky offensive was launched in July 1917, the 1st Guards Corps was part of the reserve of the Russian Eleventh Army, which was tasked with the main assault during the offensive. The corps was ordered to go into battle against Austro-German positions without any artillery attack beforehand, and the Preobrazhensky and other regiments took heavy losses as a result of the battle, without achieving their objectives.

However, during the subsequent German counteroffensive against Russian positions, the Preobrazhensky Regiment was one of the few units that put up a fight and remained effective. The Stavka, the Russian high command, reported in the early days of the German counteroffensive:

"On the Southwestern Front under the slightest artillery fire our forces, forgetting their duty and oath to the Motherland, are abandoning their positions. Along the entire front only in the Tarnopol district the Preobrazhensky and Semyonovsky Regiments are carrying out their duty."

Colonel Alexander Kutepov (later a general) became the last commander of the regiment in April 1917; he disbanded the formation in December 1917 in the wake of the October Revolution of November 1917.

=== 21st century ===
In 2013 the regiment re-formed within the Russian Armed Forces as the 154th Preobrazhensky Independent Commandant's Regiment.

=== Timeline ===
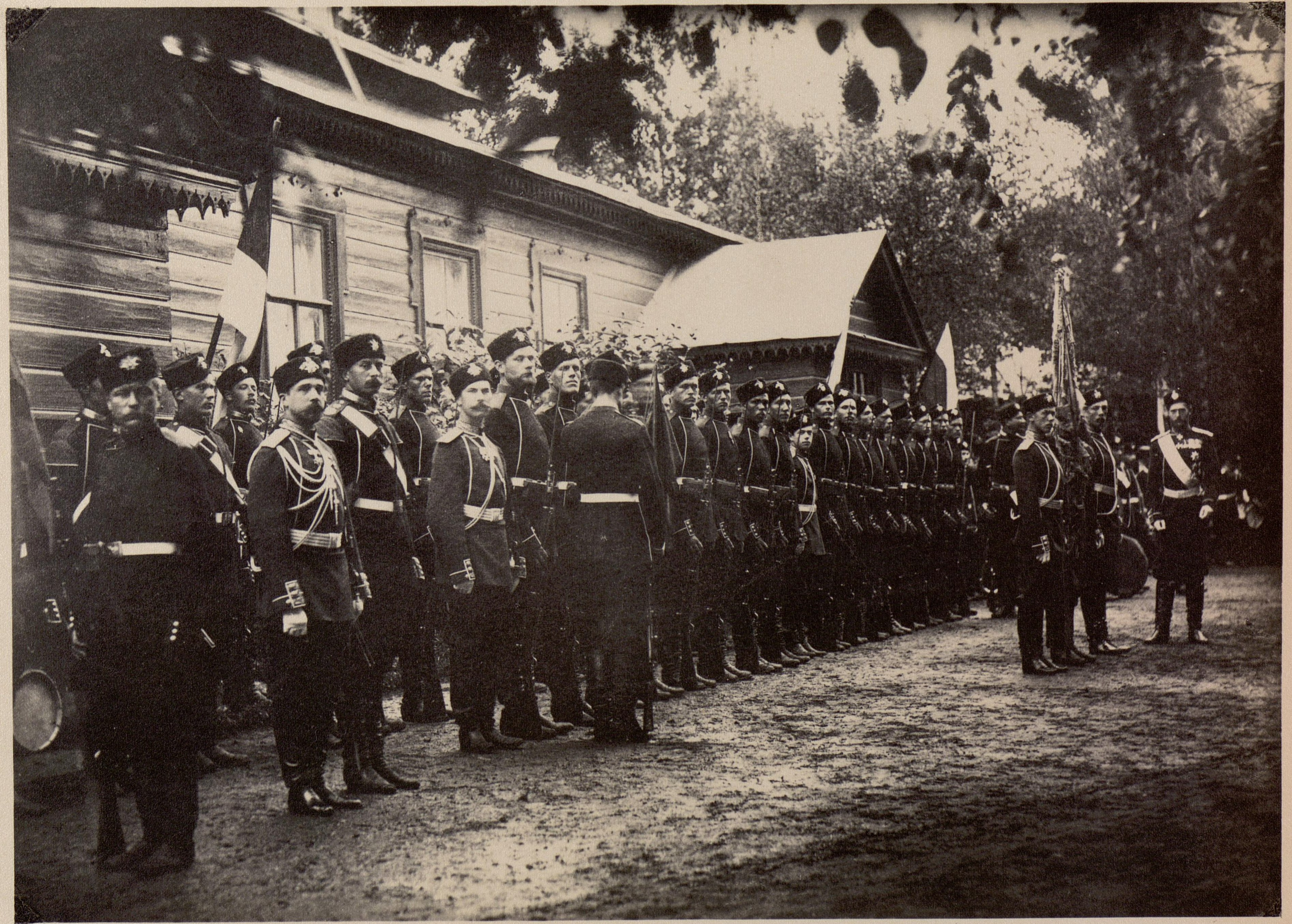
The regiment in 1887

- 1683 – Peter the Great begins to assemble the droll regiments. Initially the number of soldiers was fewer than fifty.
- 1687 – Droll regiments become the Semenovsky regiment and Preobrazhensky regiments of the regular army.
- 1695 – Preobrazhensky regiment (nine companies) takes part in the Azov campaigns.
- 1696 – The regiment is divided into four battalions and two separate companies of bombardiers and grenadiers.
- 1700–1720 – Takes part in all major battles of the Great Northern War.
- 1700 – Before the Battle of Narva is officially named Leib-Guard Preobrazhensky regiment.
- 1706 – Tsar Peter the Great adopts the military rank of colonel of Preobrazhensky regiment.
- 1722 – Takes part in the war against Persia.
- 1722 – According to Russian Table of Ranks soldiers of Preobrazhensky regiment were to be considered two ranks higher than in ordinary units.
- 1726 – Moscow company of Preobrazhensky regiment becomes a separate Moscow life-guard battalion and later Murom leib-guard battalion.
- 1737–1739 – War against the Ottoman Empire.
- 1737 – Takes part in the siege of Ochakov.
- 1742 – War against Sweden.
- 1762 – On 17 July declared first and highest in the military order of precedence in the Imperial Russian Army and the Imperial Russian Guard.
- 1789–1790 – War against Sweden.
- 1796 – Battalions of the Preobrazhensky regiment are named according to their chiefs: 1st battalion – His Majesty, 2nd battalion – Lieutenant-General Tatischev, 3d Battalion – General Field-Marshal Suvorov, Grenadier Battalion – Major-General Arakcheev.
- 1805 – As a part of the Grand Duke's Corps of Guards the 1st and 3rd battalions leave St. Petersburg for Austria on 22 August; on 2 December take part in the battle of Austerlitz and return to St. Petersburg on 19 April 1806.
- 1807 – In February the Regiment, consisting of all 4 battalions, starts the march as a part of Grand Duke's Corps of Guards; on 5 June engages Ney's troops near Guttstadt and Altkirchen and on 14 June takes part in the battle of Friedland; returns to St. Petersburg in August.
- 1808 – On 9 September the 2nd battalion of the regiment enters the Corps of Major-General Strogonov in Villmanstrand (Lappeenranta), Finland.
- 1809 – On 10 March, being a part of the Corps of Lieutenant-General Prince Bagration, starts its march to Sweden through the Åland islands; on 14 March fights the enemy's rearguard on the island of Lemland; on 17 March stops on the Eckerö island, closest to the Swedish shore, and after the talks with Sweden begins moving back; returns to St. Petersburg in October.

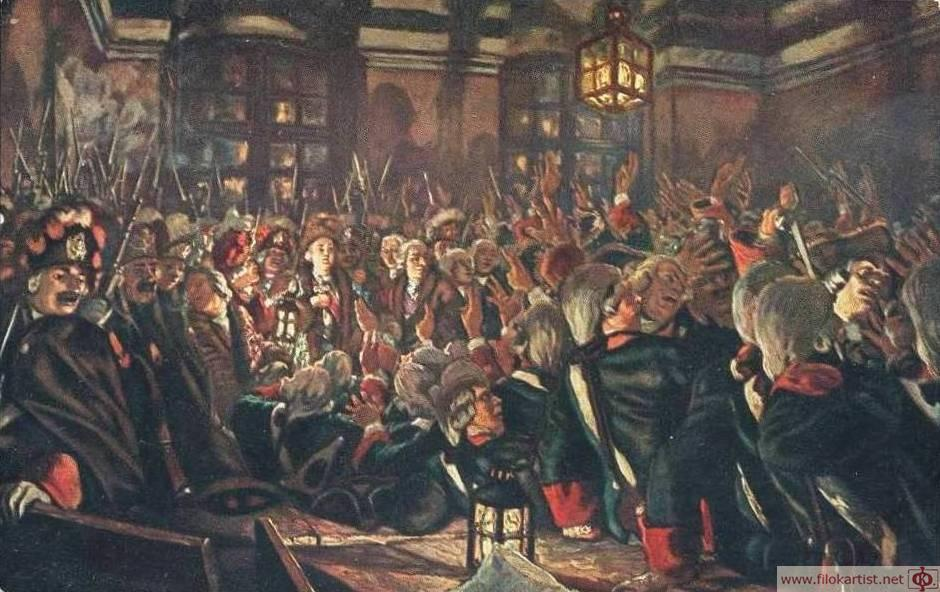
The Preobrazhensky Regiment soldiers proclaim Elizabeth the empress of Russia.

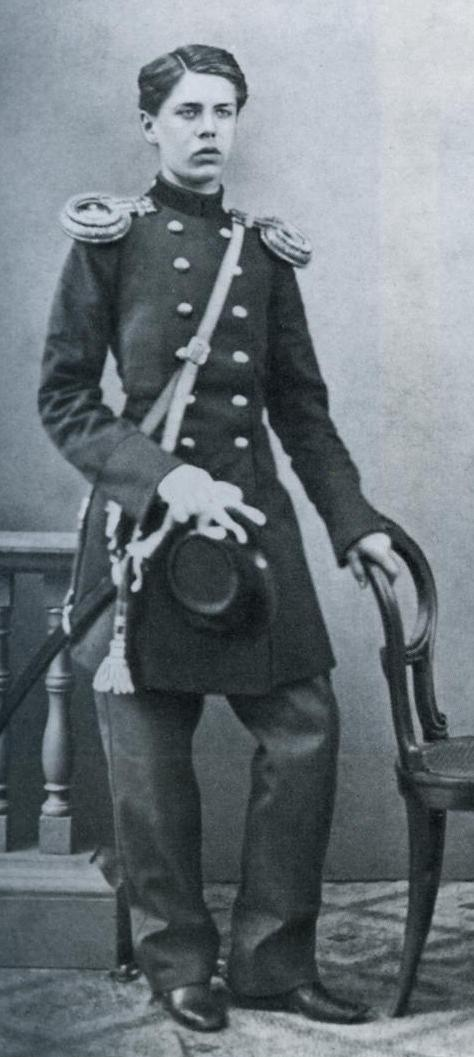
Young Modest Mussorgsky as a cadet in the Preobrazhensky Regiment of the Imperial Guard

- 1811 – The regiment is transformed into 3 battalions; each battalion now comprises one grenadier company (grenadier and tirailleur platoons) and three fusilier companies.
- 1812 – As a part of the Grand Duke's Corps of Guards, the regiment moves in March to Vilno, where it joins the 1st Western Army of Barclay-de-Tolly; on 7 September takes part in the battle of Borodino. During the French retreat from Moscow the regiment was in the reserve all the time and returns to Vilno in December.
- 1813 – On 13 January, the Guard crosses the Nieman river in the presence of the Emperor; on 2 April participates in the grand parade in the presence of the Emperor and King Frederick William III of Prussia; on 14 April triumphantly enters Dresden; on 2 May takes part in the battle of Lützen; on the 19th, 20th and 21 May the regiment is a central reserve under the command of Grand Duke in the battle of Bautzen; on 28 August and 29 August, being a part of 1st Guards Infantry Division under the command of General Yermolov, is distinguished in the Battle of Kulm.
- 1814 – On 13 January in the presence of the Emperor Alexander I, the Regiment crosses the Rhine at Basel and as a part of the reserve of the Main Army under Barclay-de-Tolly, participates in every offensive and retreat until the battle of Paris (30 March); on 31 March triumphantly enters the capital of France; 1st battalion of the regiment has its bivouac near the Palace of Tuileries. After staying in Paris for more than two months the Regiment leaves for Normandy, embarking at Cherbourg on 15 June and on 12 August entering St. Petersburg through the Triumphal arch, constructed by the Emperor's order in the memory of excellent service of the Guard in 1812–1814.
- 1877–1878 – War against the Ottoman Empire.
- 1906 – First Battalion excluded from the regiment and stripped of Life-Guard privileges, instead the new first battalion of the regiment is formed from cavaliers of the Order of St. George and heroes of the Russo-Japanese War.
- 1914–1917 - Participated in World War I.
- 1917 – Garrison battalions participated in the February Revolution mutining on Monday 12 March; leading to the abdication of Tsar Nicholas II. Disbanded in December by Alexander Kutepov, its last commander.
- 2013 – Re-established as the 154th Preobrazhensky Independent Commandant's Regiment.

== Basis of recruitment ==
In the 18th and 19th centuries, officers of the Preobrazhensky Regiment were young Russian aristocrats and appointment was considered a proof of loyalty to the government and the tsar. Among its membership was the Russian composer Modest Mussorgsky.

After 1874 ordinary soldiers of the Preobrazhensky Regiment were mainly conscripts undertaking their obligation to serve for three years in the active army and fifteen years in the reserve (Opolchaniya). For the Preobrazhensky Regiment conscripts were selected for their height and fair hair in order to provide a standardised appearance on parade.

== Flag ==
The regimental flag was of St. George's colours, with the inscription: "For displayed feats in battle of Kulm 17th of August 1813". (29 August 1813 in the Julian calendar).

This colour was given to the regiment in order to celebrate its action at Kulm, where the outnumbered Preobrazhensky regiment withstood the charge of French troops.

== Uniforms ==
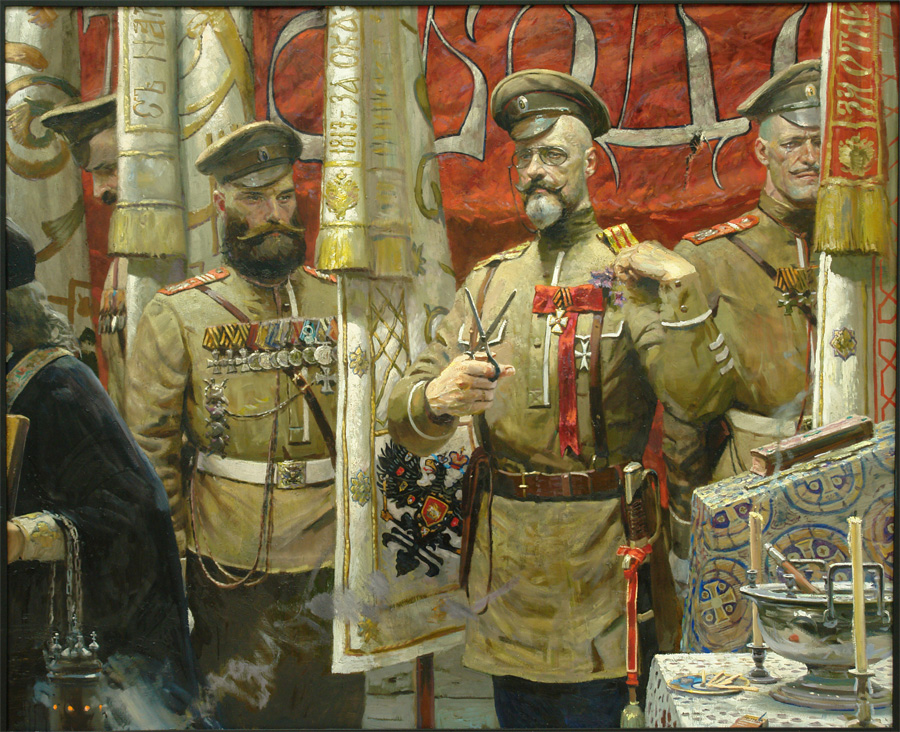
Alexander Kutepov, last commander of the Preobrazhensky Regiment, removing his shoulder straps after hearing of the end of the 304-year Romanov reign.

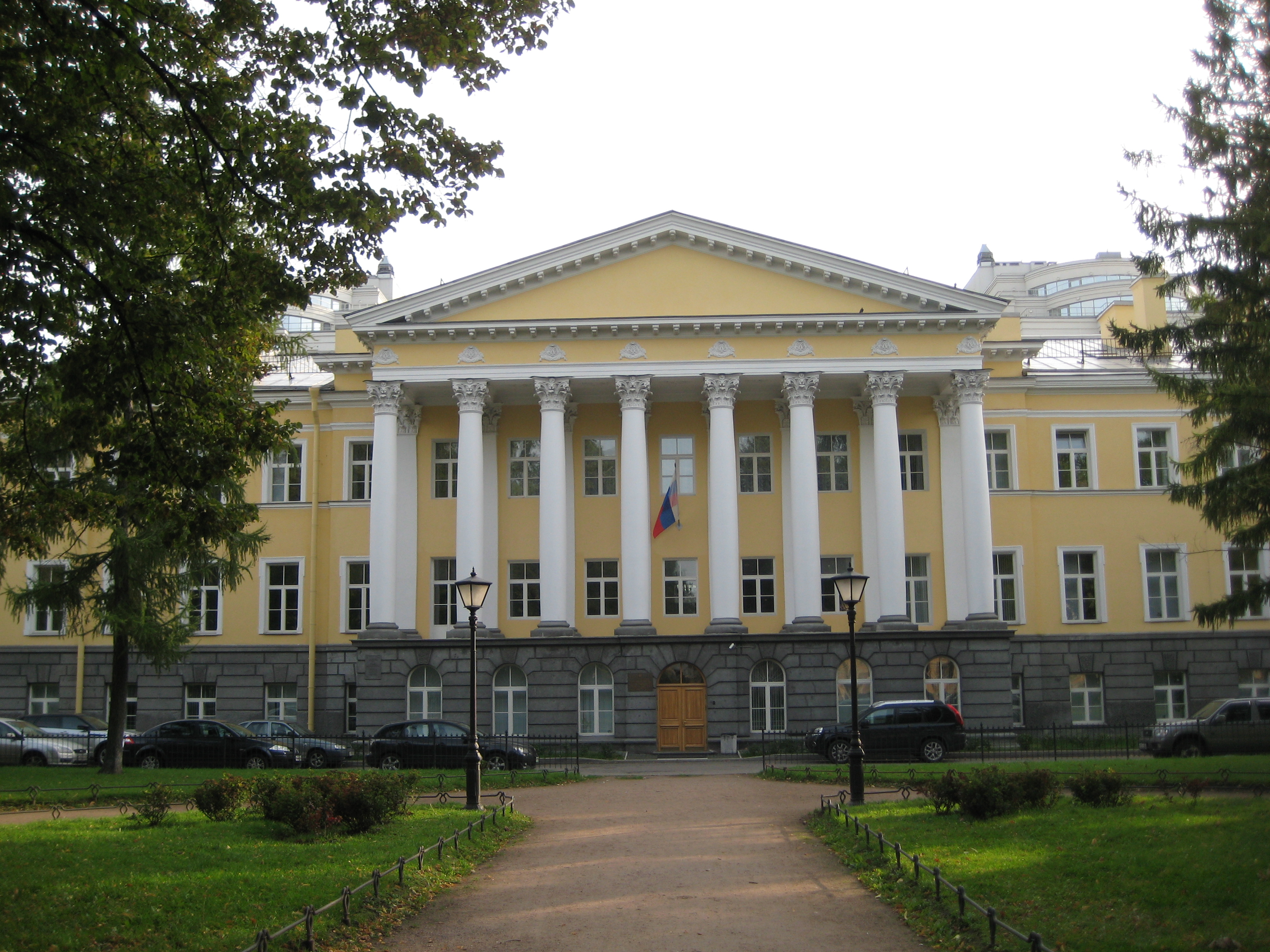
Preobrazhnesky Barracks in St. Petersburg

Throughout its history the regiment wore the standard uniform of the Infantry of the Imperial Guard, which from 1683 to 1914 was predominantly of a dark green (eventually verging on black) colour. The main distinctions of the Preobrazhensky Regiment were the red facings (plastron, collar, cuffs and shoulder straps) edged in white piping. Distinctive regimental patterns of braid (litzen) were worn on the tunic collar, plus the tsar's monogram on the soldiers' shoulder straps and officers' epaulettes.

Following the Russo-Turkish War, the regiment was awarded a small bronze scroll to be worn as a battle-honour on shakos and other headdresses. In 1883, in recognition of its overall distinguished record, officers of the regiment were authorised to wear a large metal gorget inscribed "1683-1850-1883". A second model of gorget, designed in imitation of that worn during the 18th century was approved for the regiment in 1910.

During World War I the Preobrazhensky Regiment retained the distinction of white edgings on the khaki-grey field uniforms adopted in 1909 (see illustration of commanding officer and senior ncos opposite).

=== Rank insignia ===
==== Officers ====
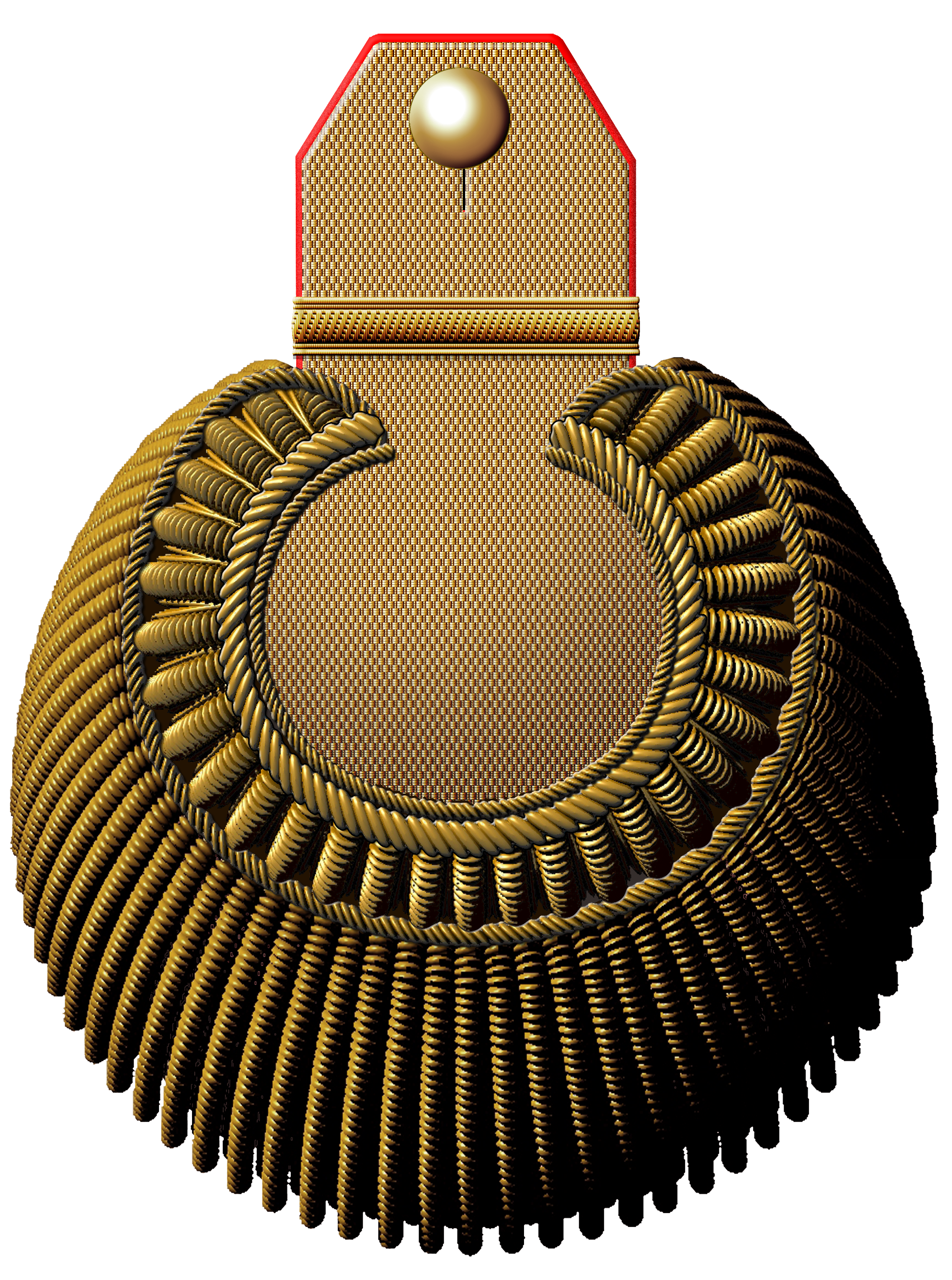
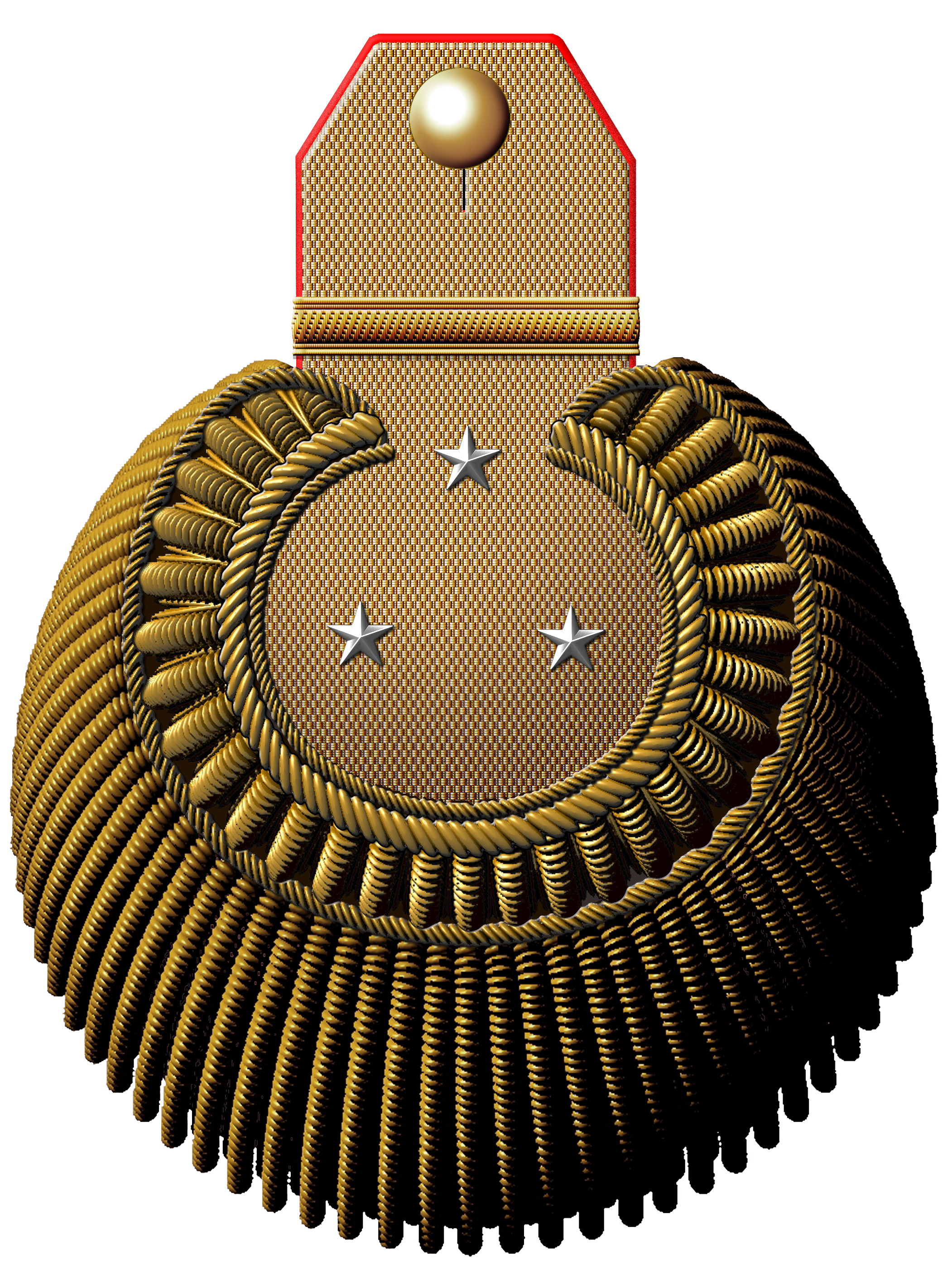
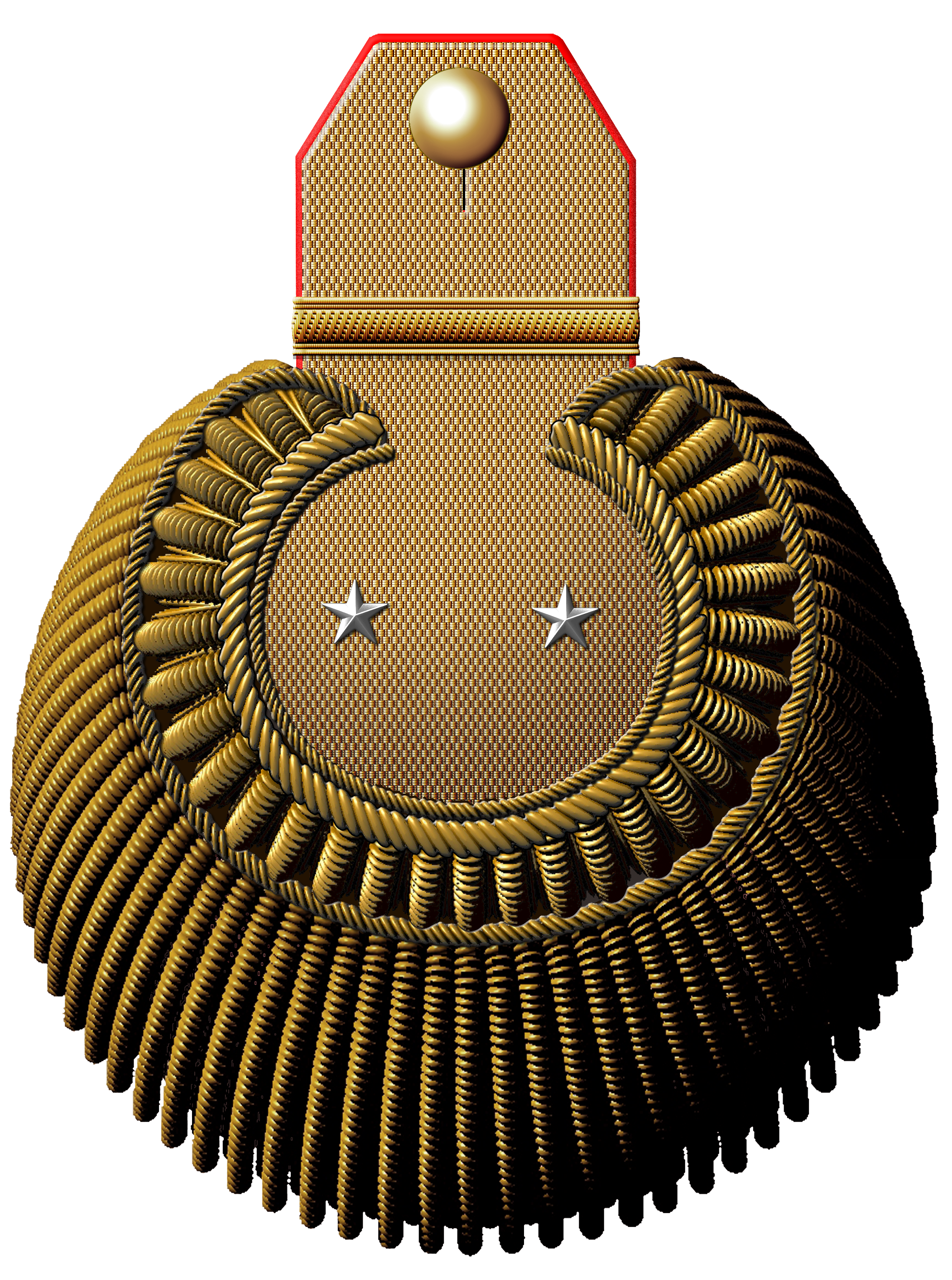
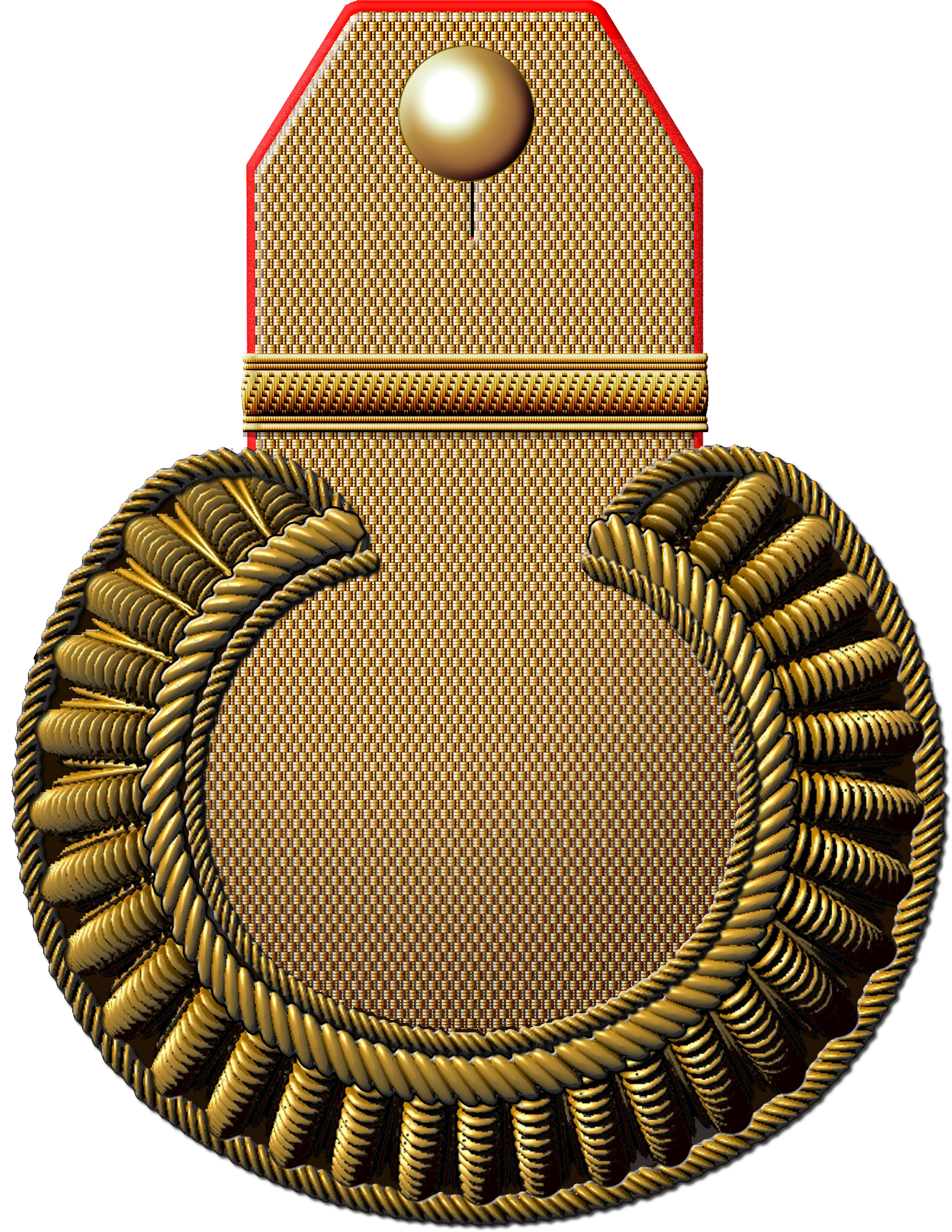
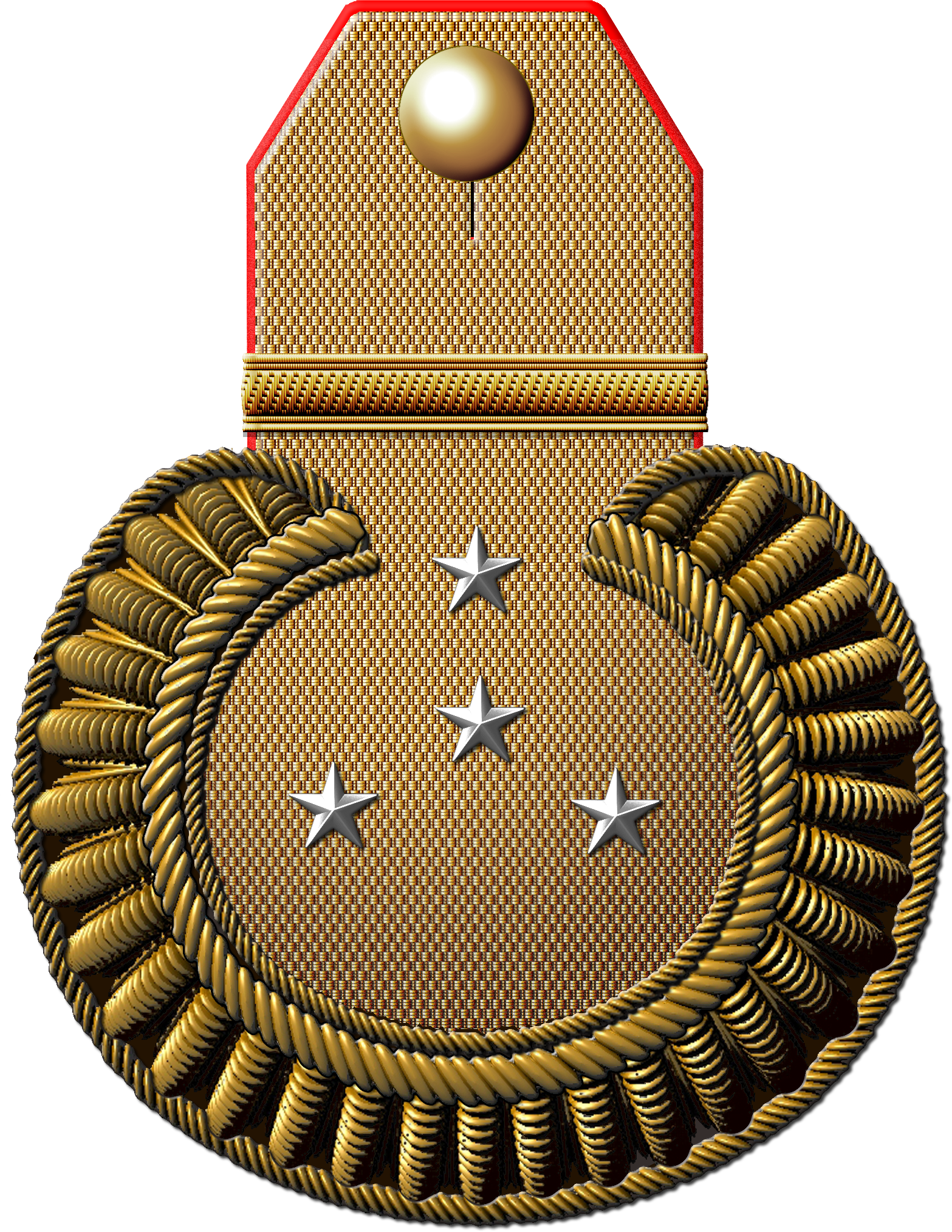
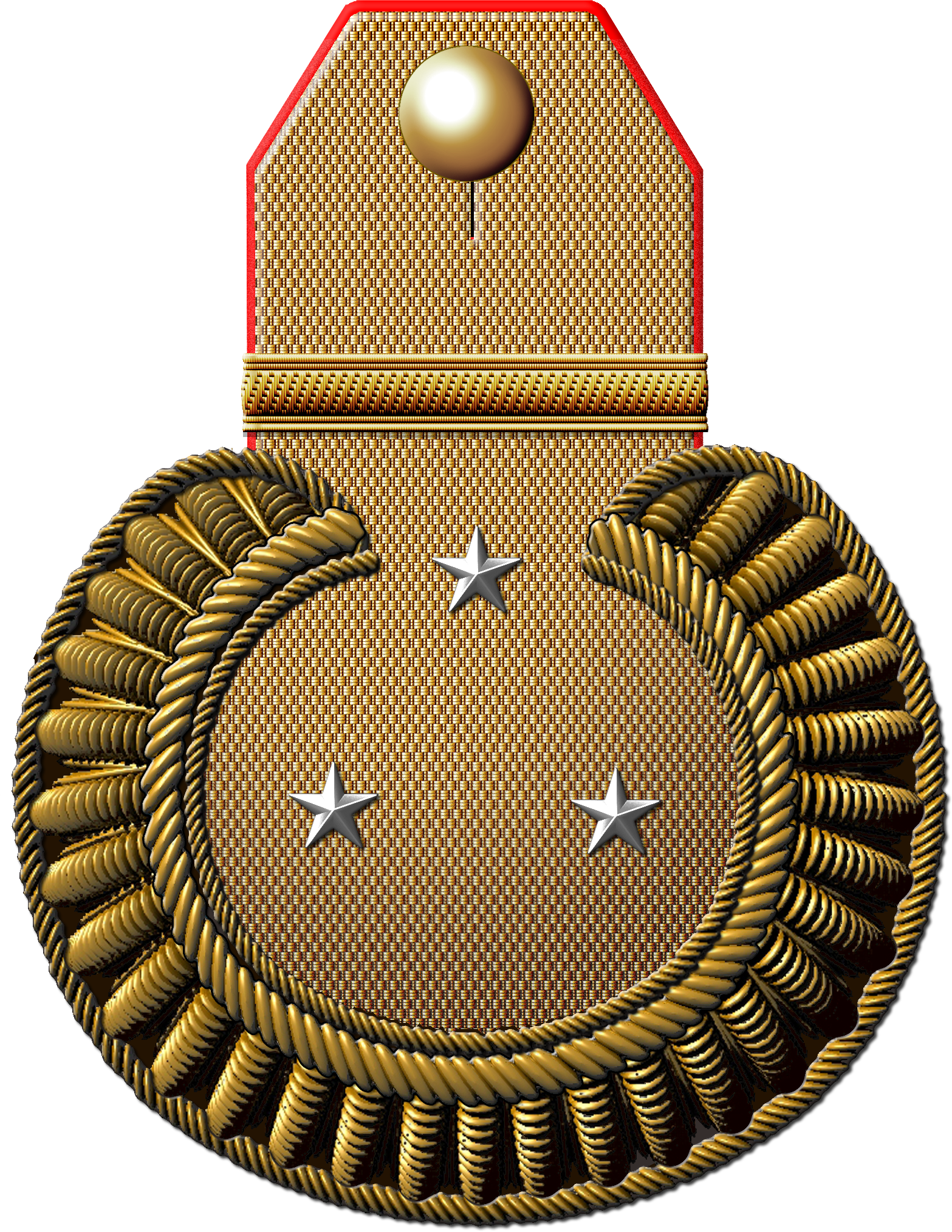
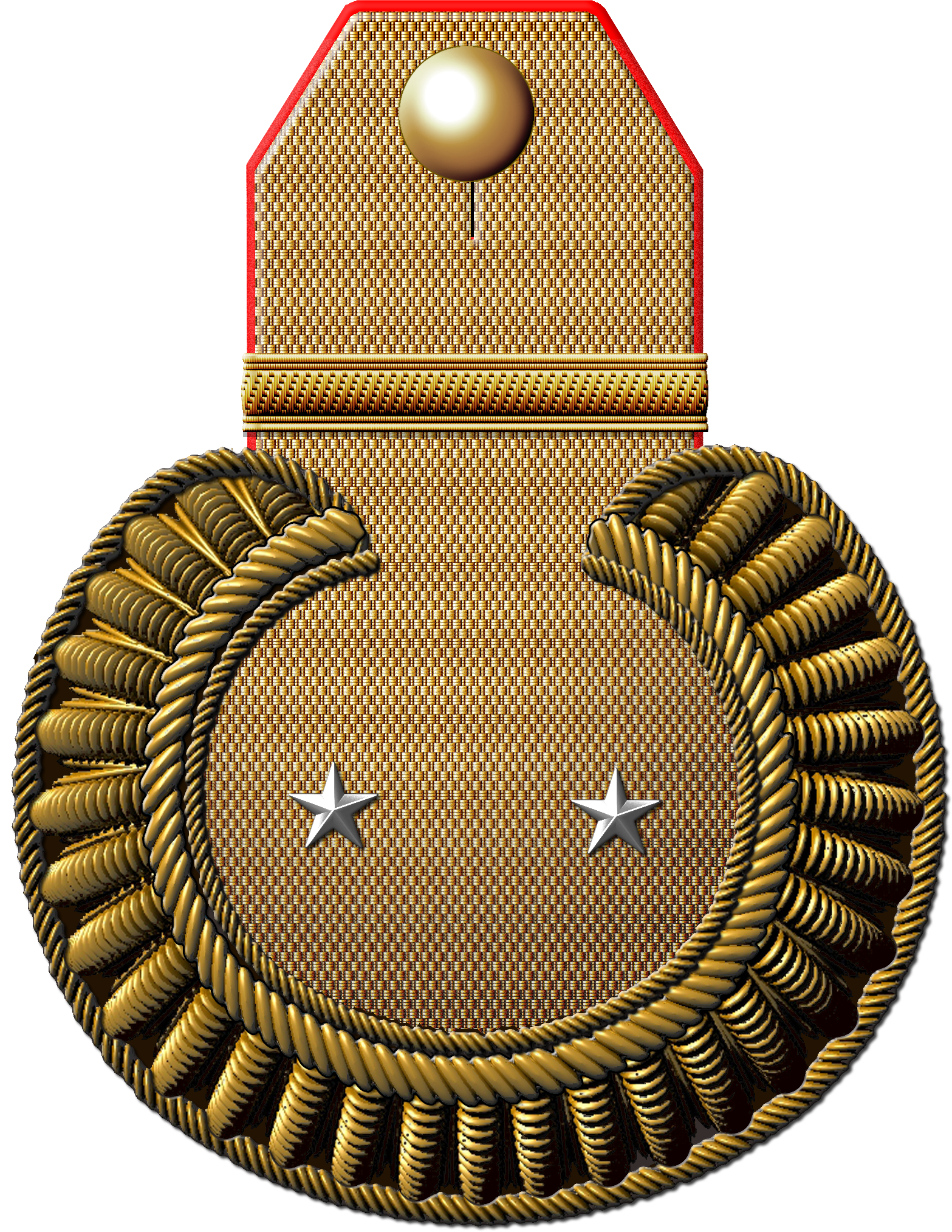
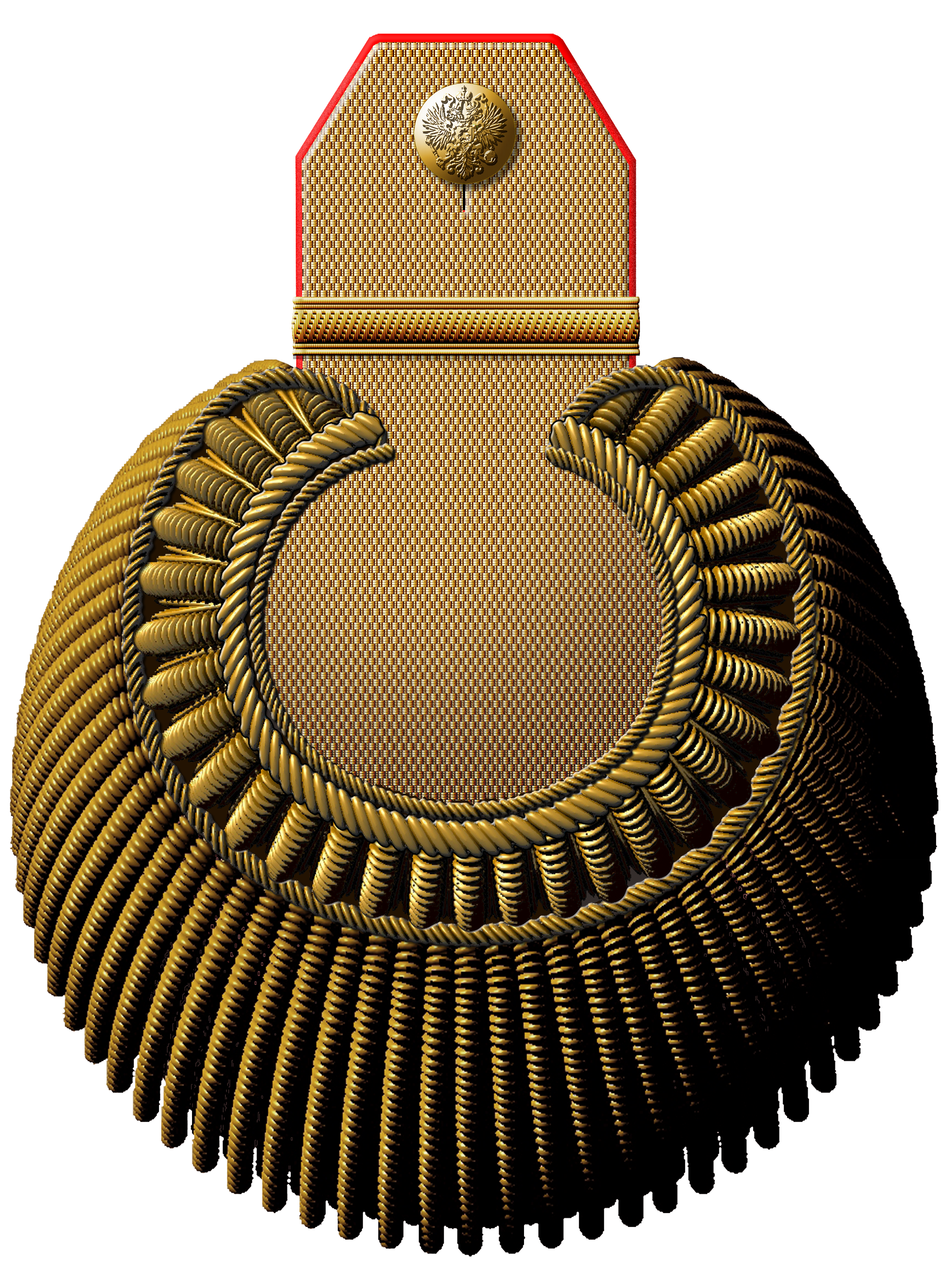
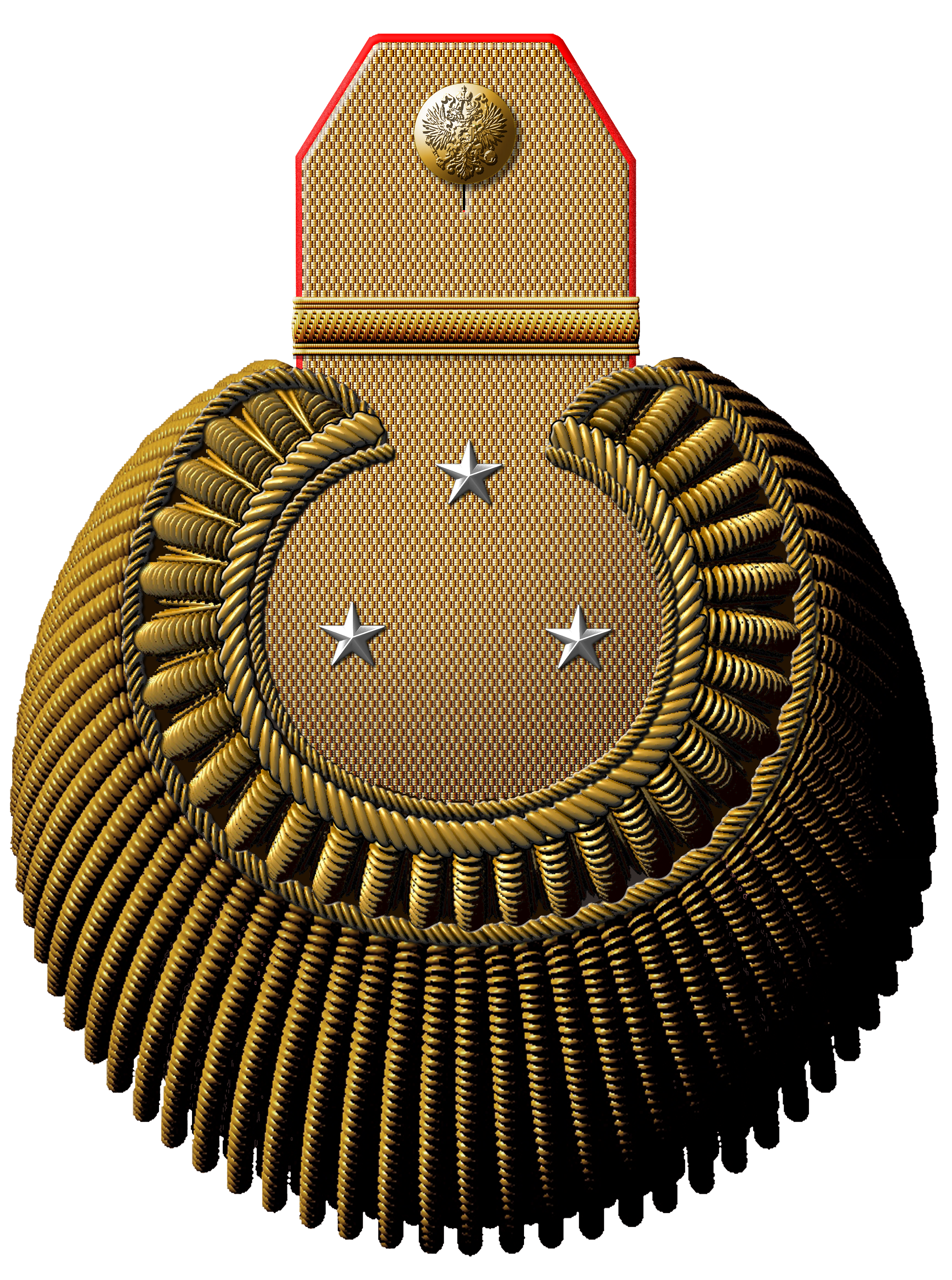
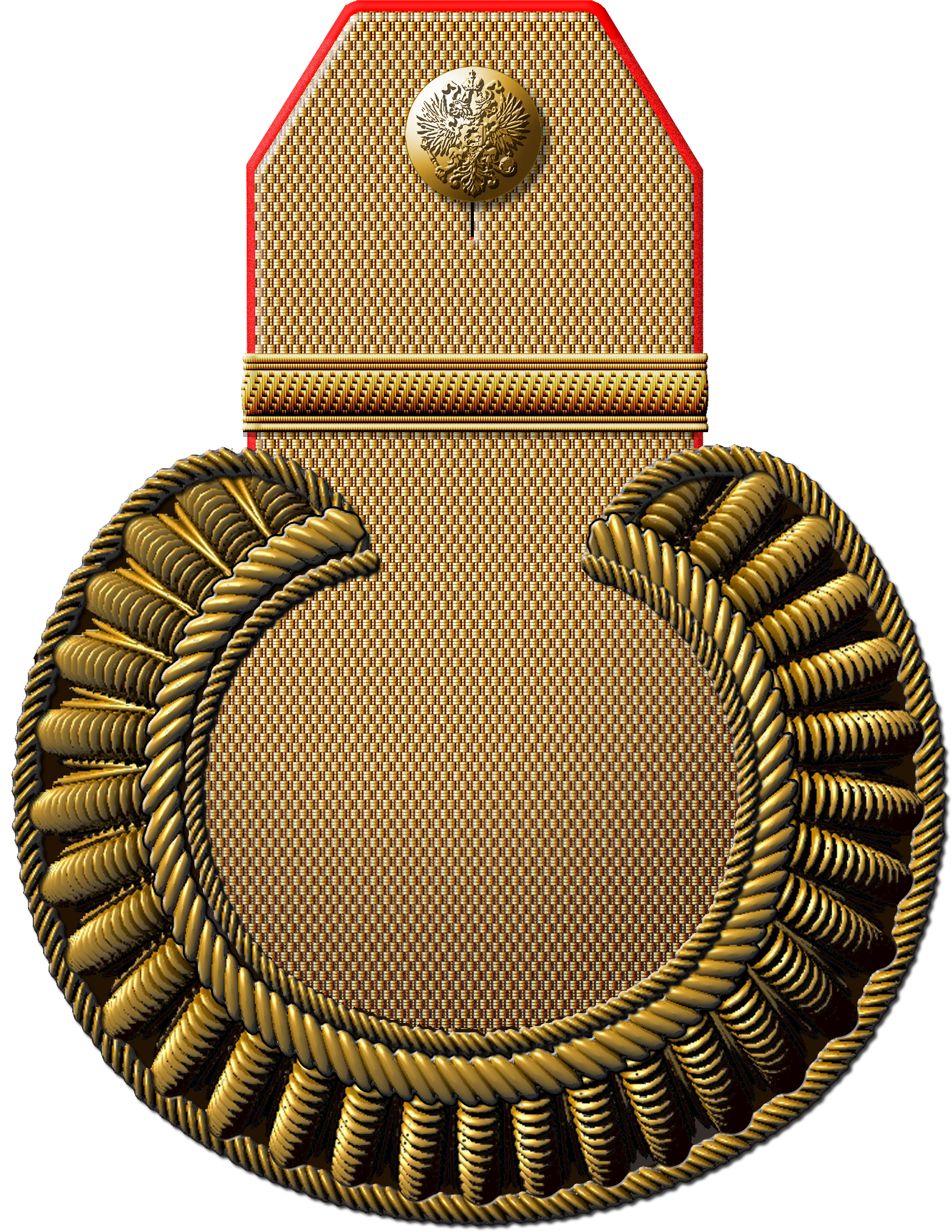
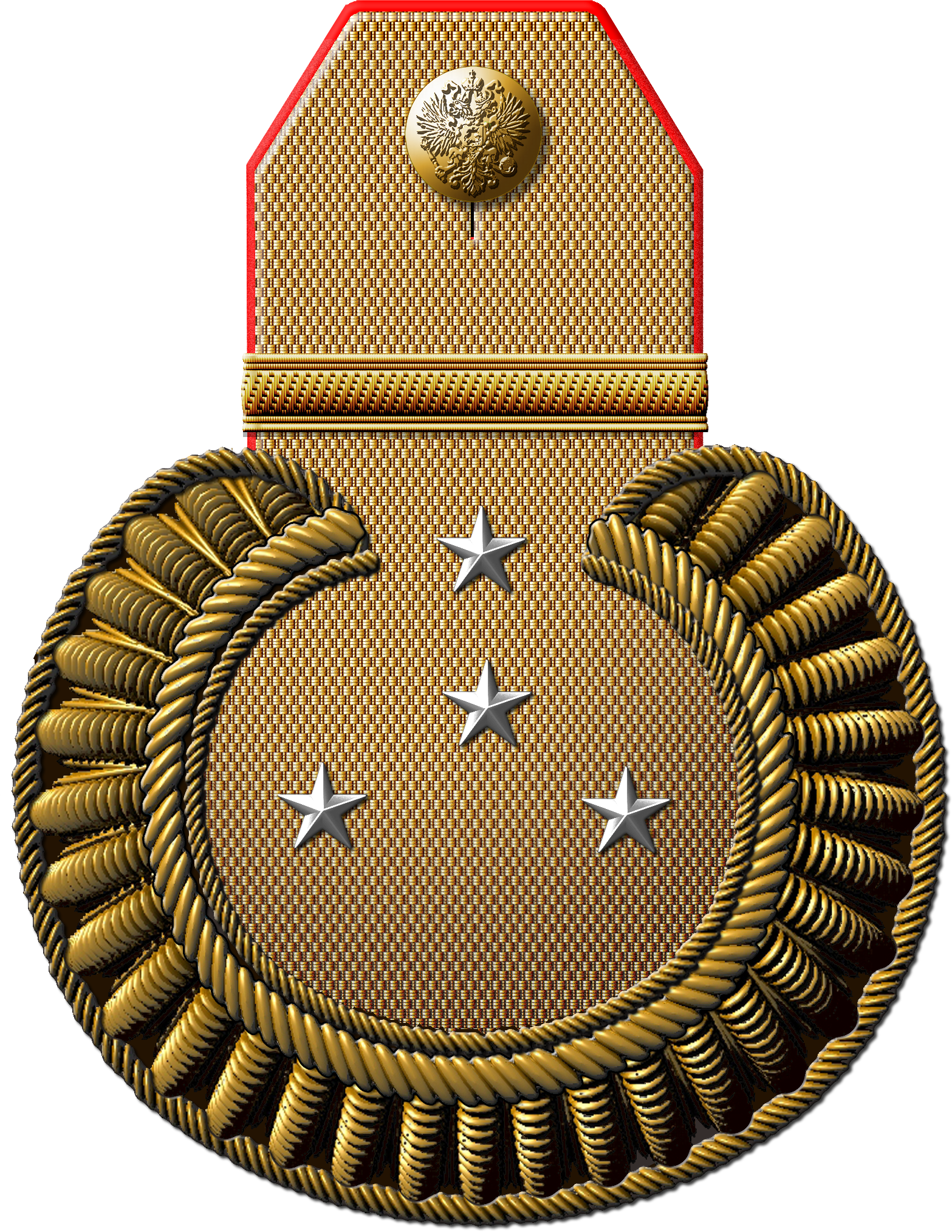
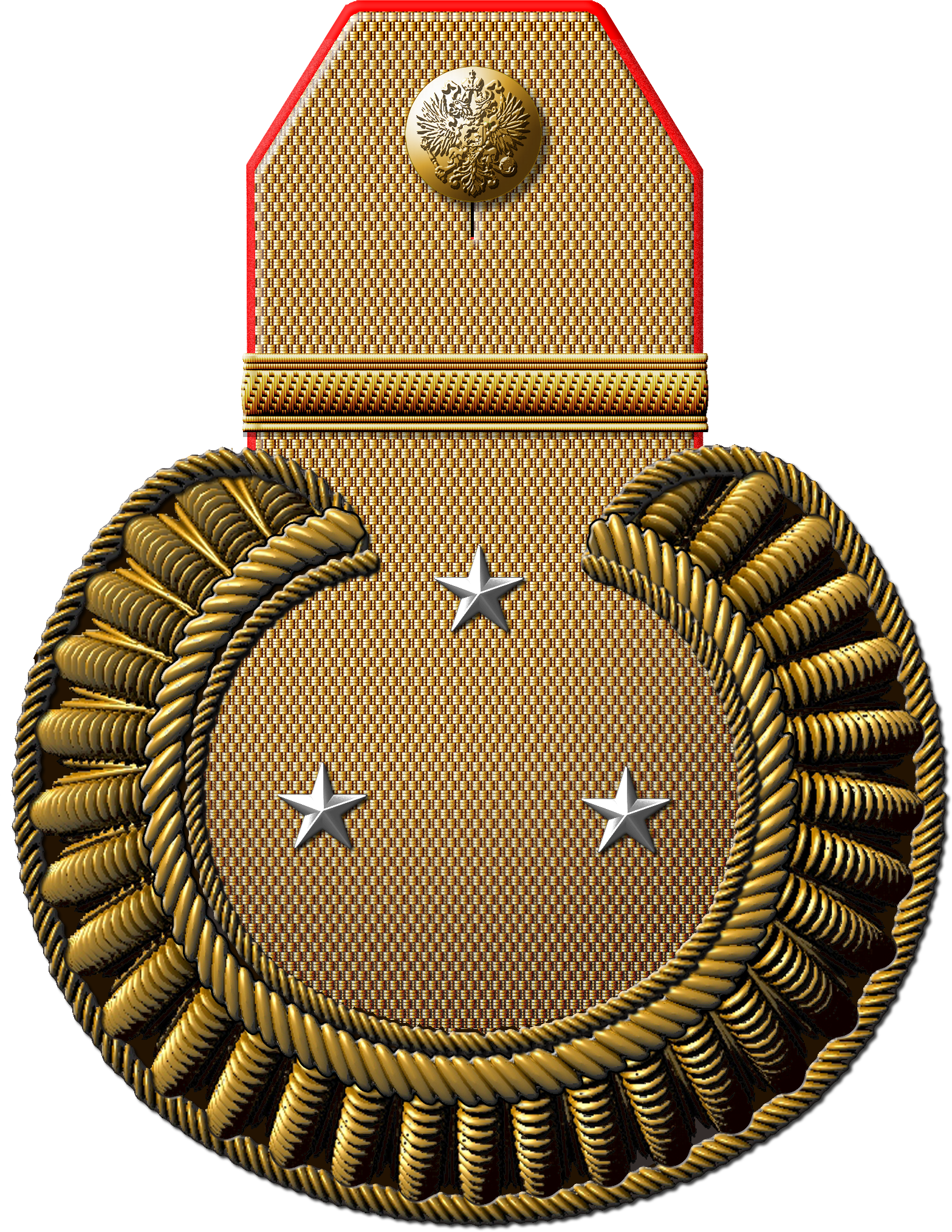
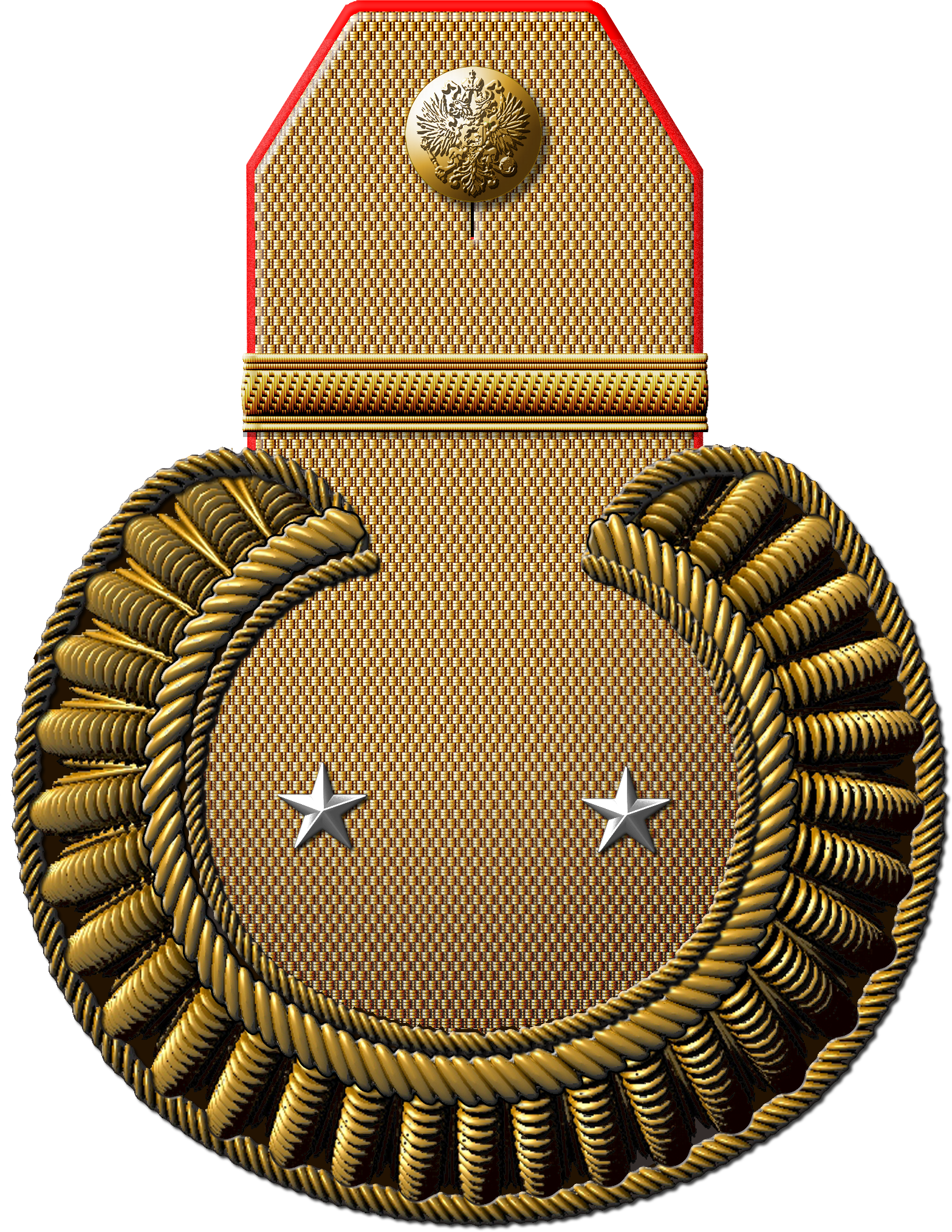
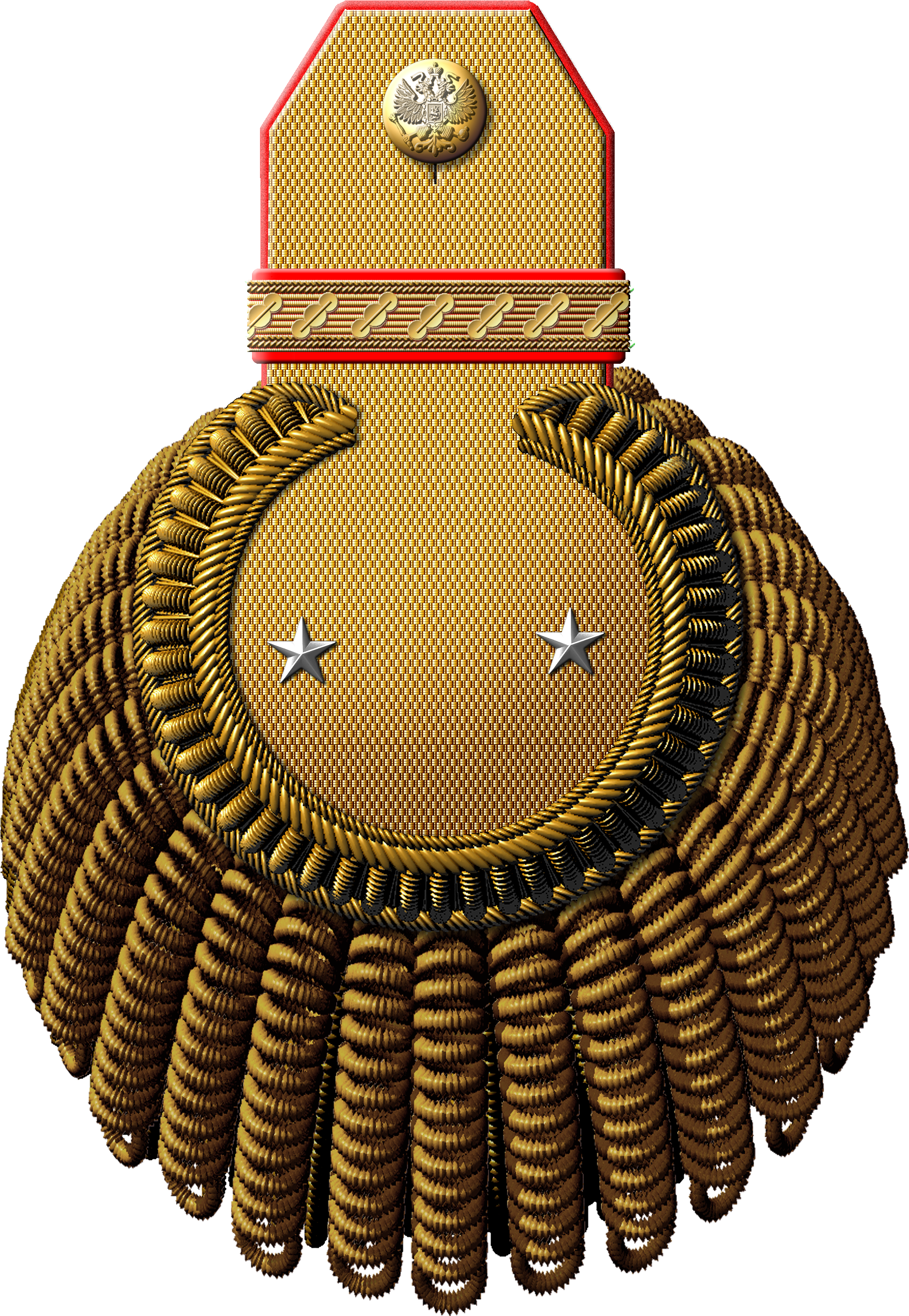
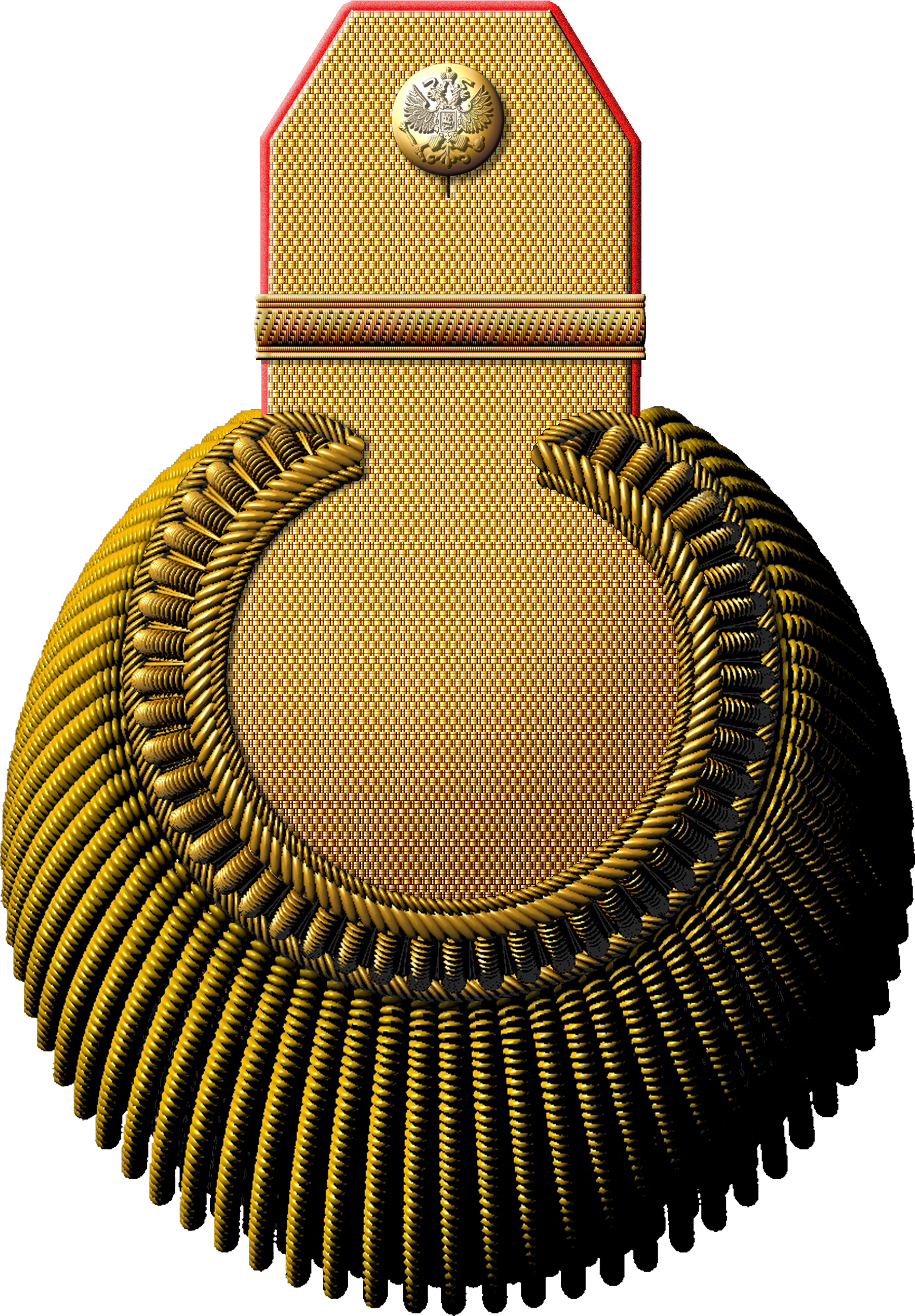
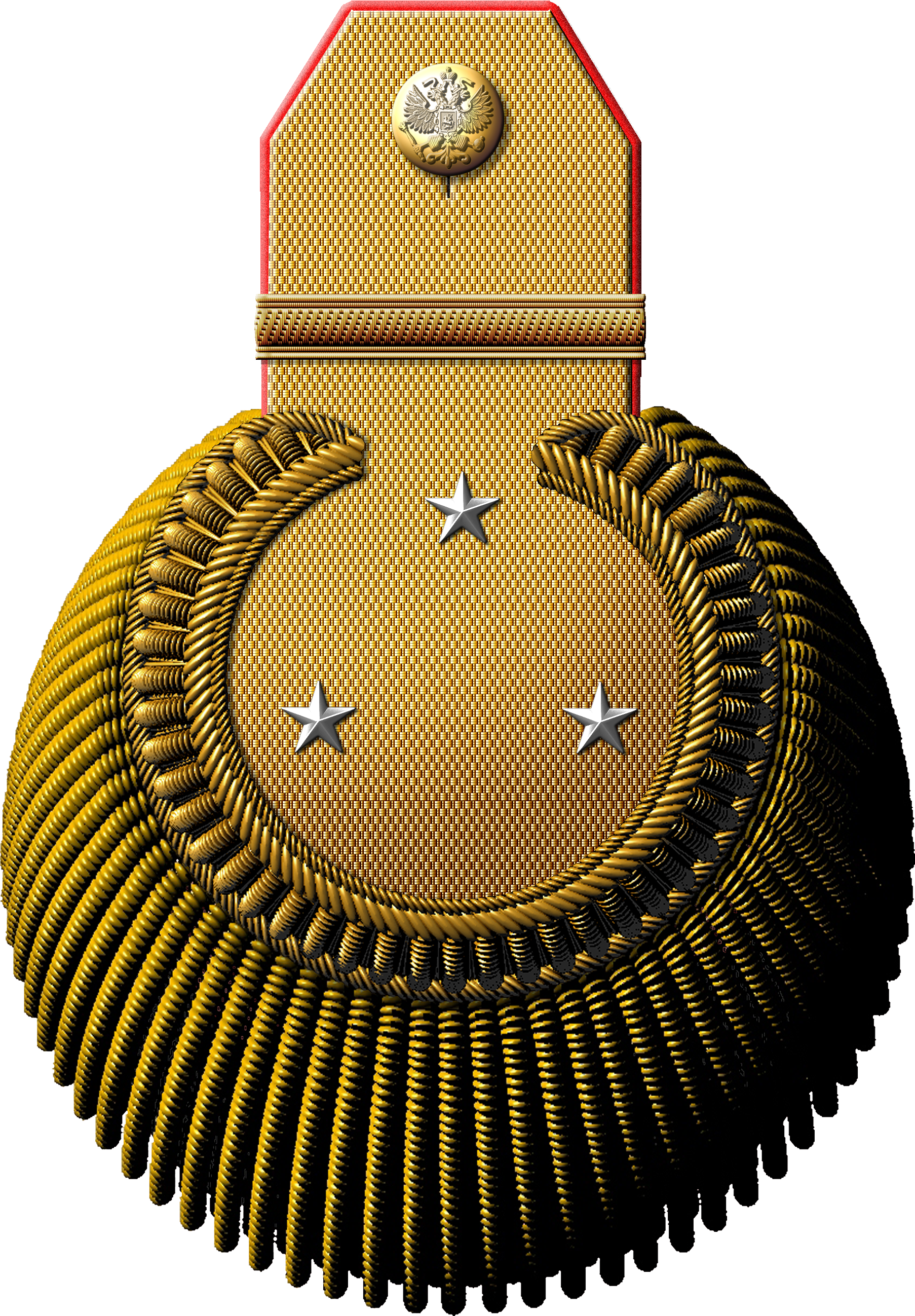
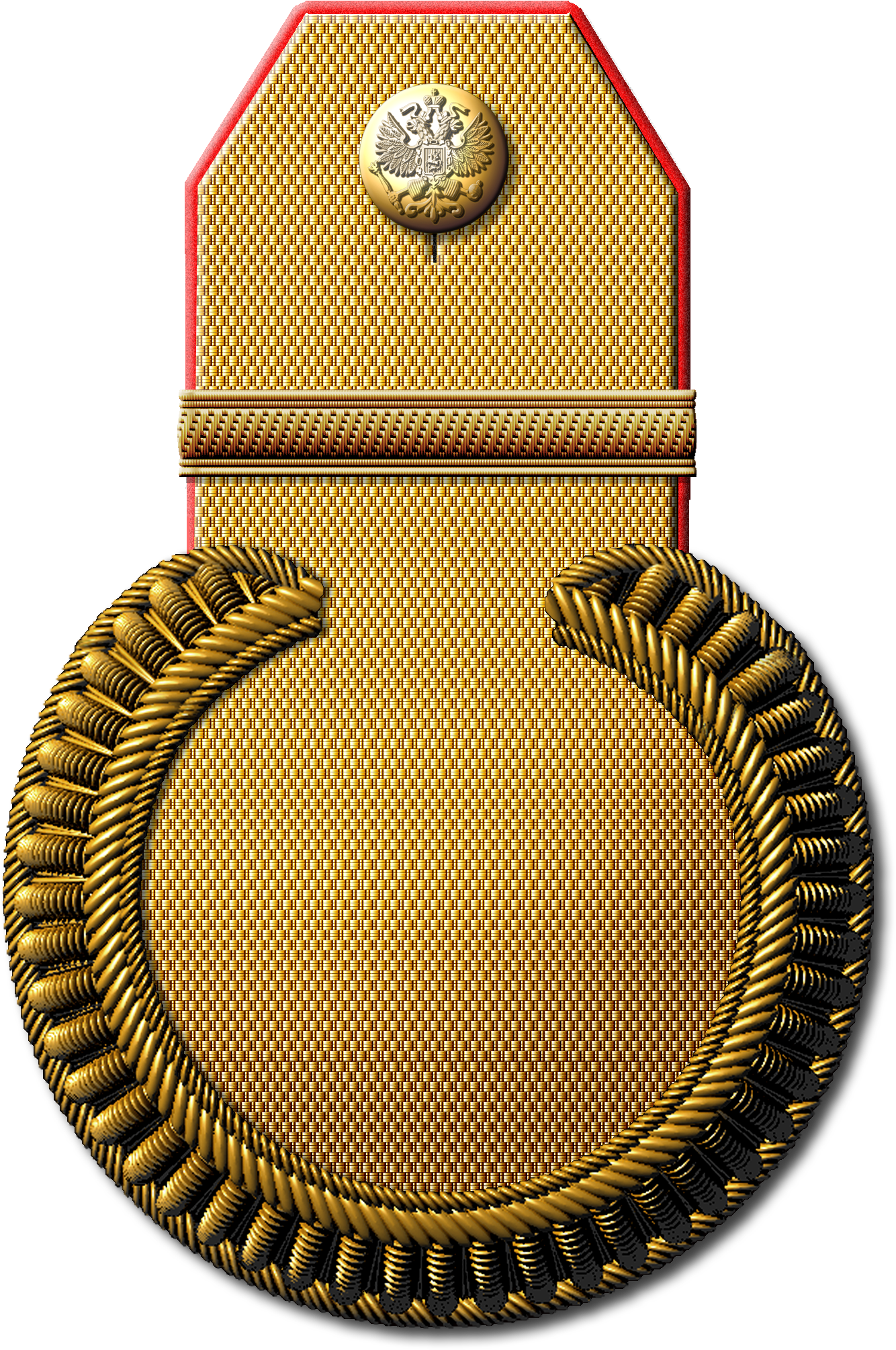
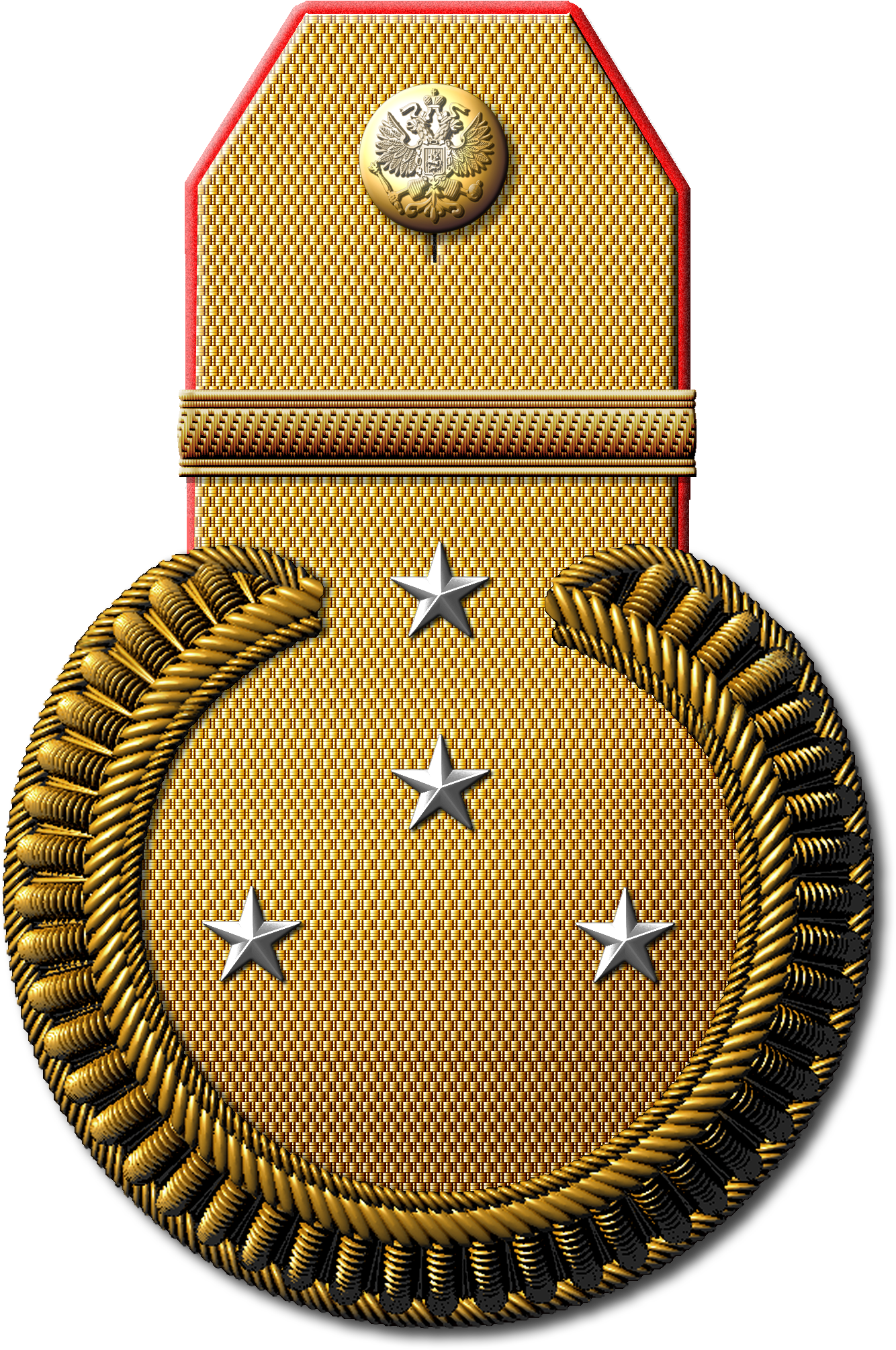
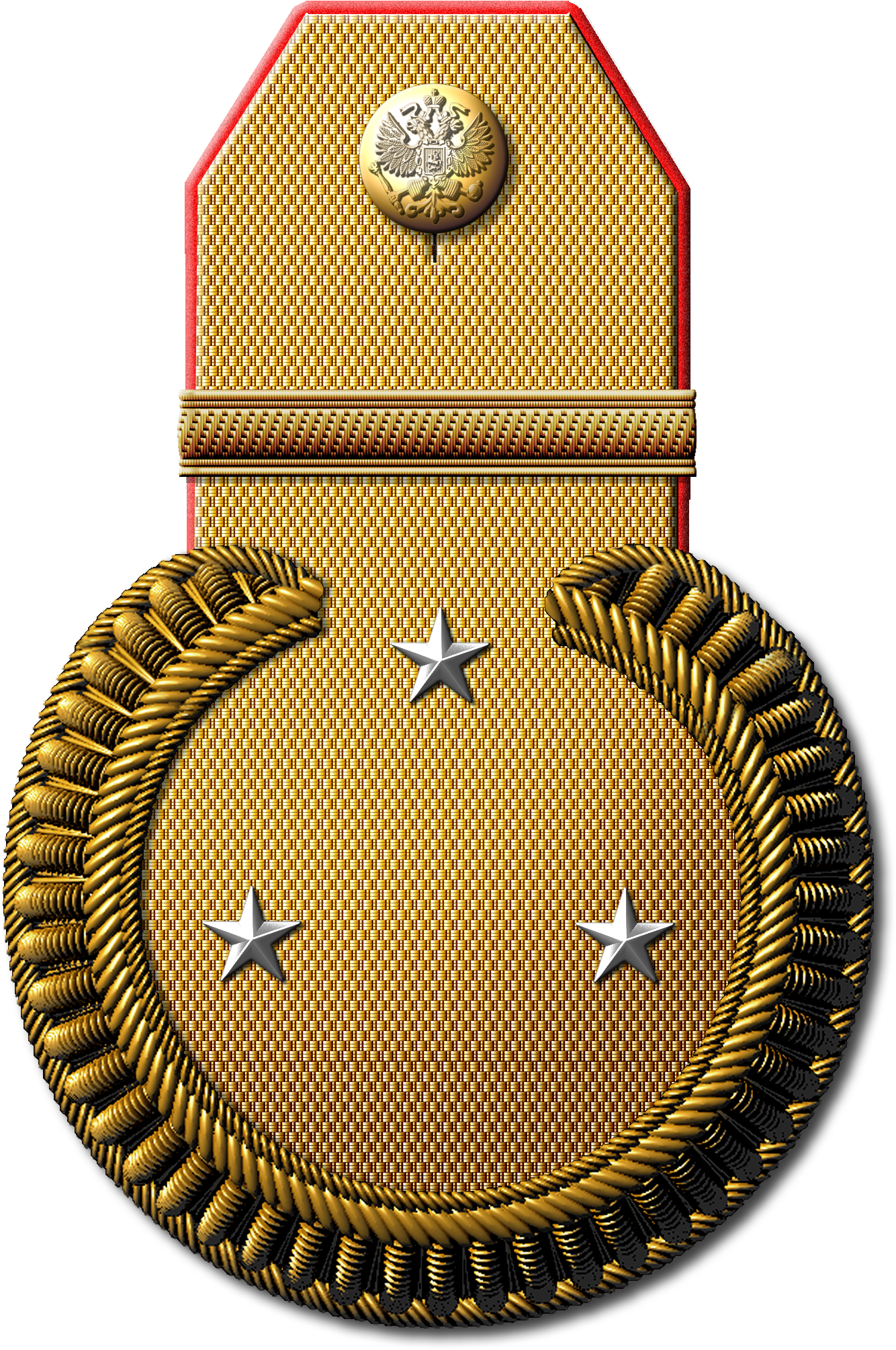
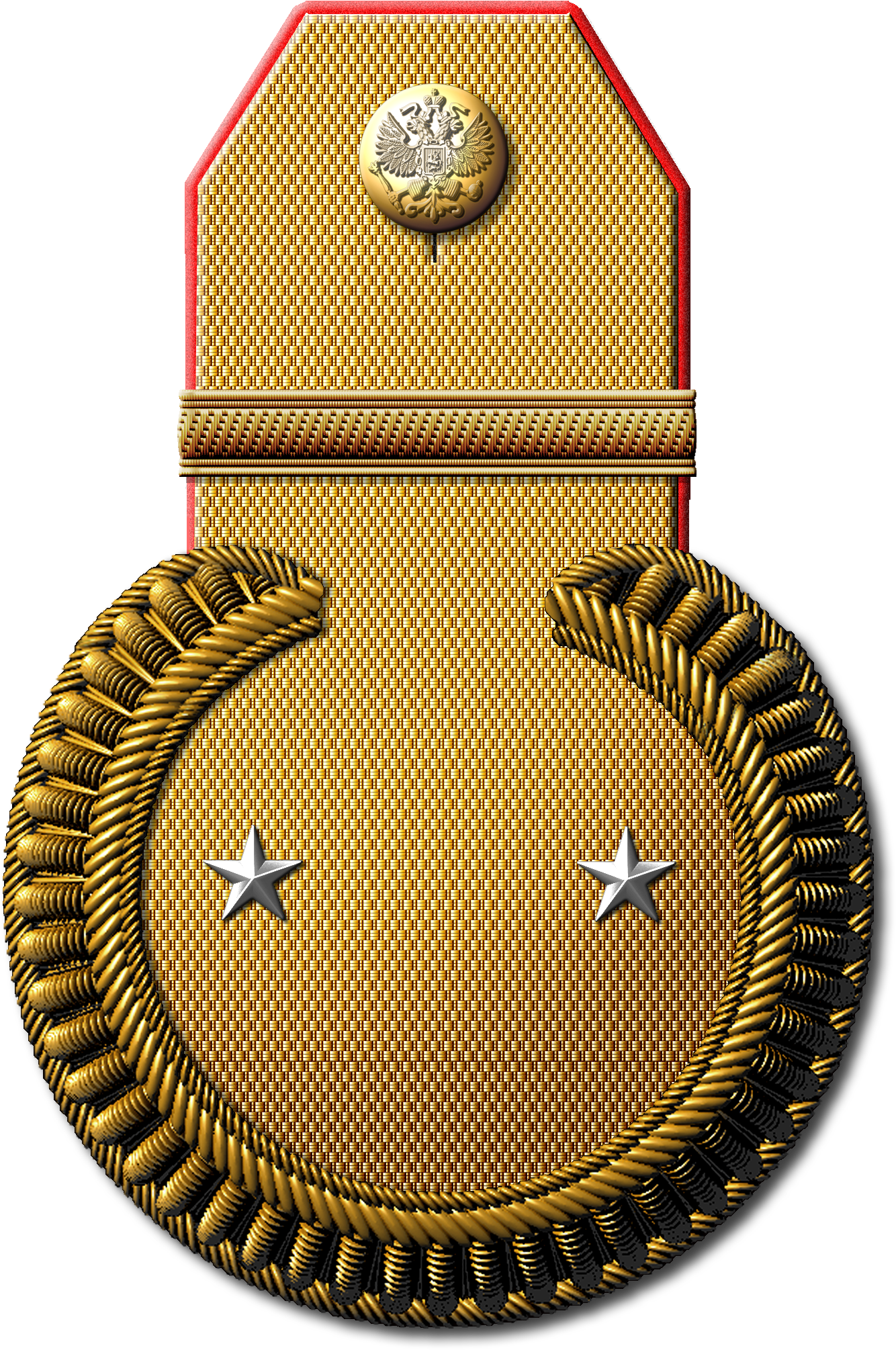
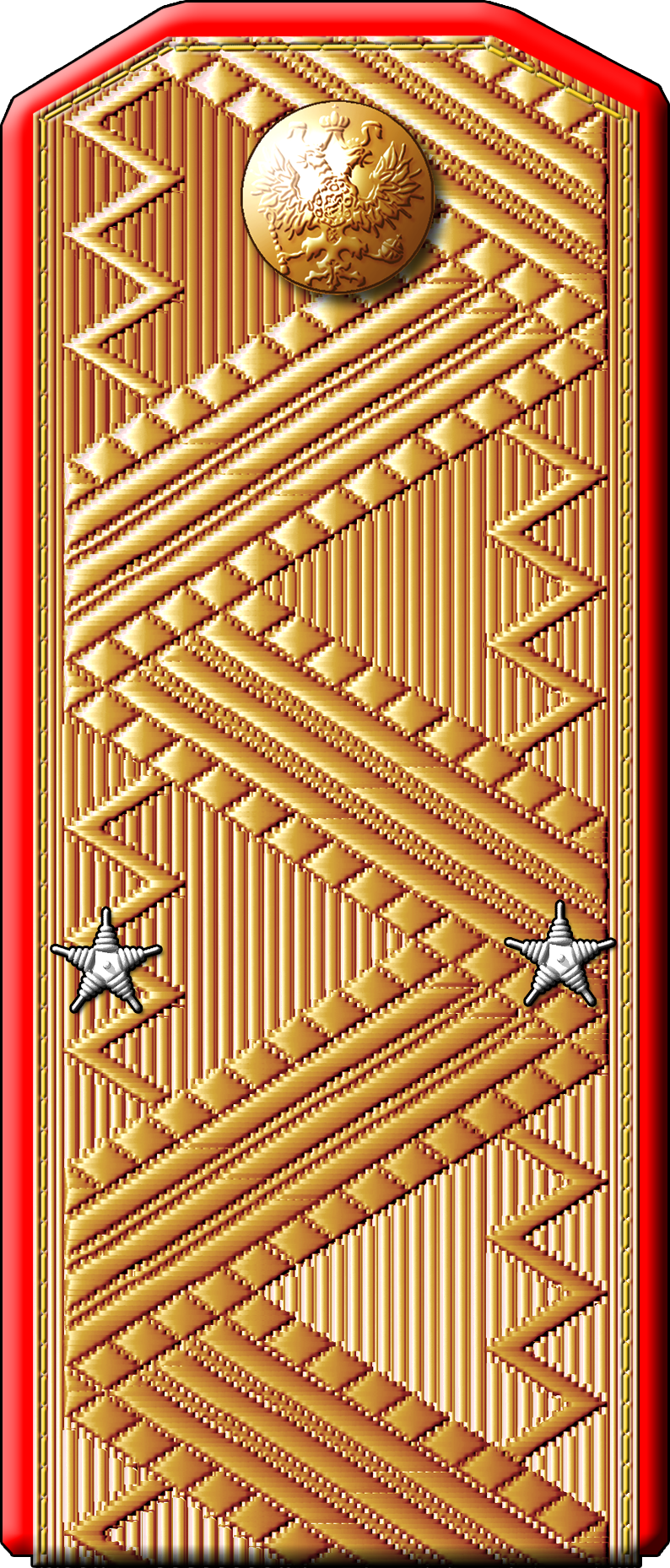
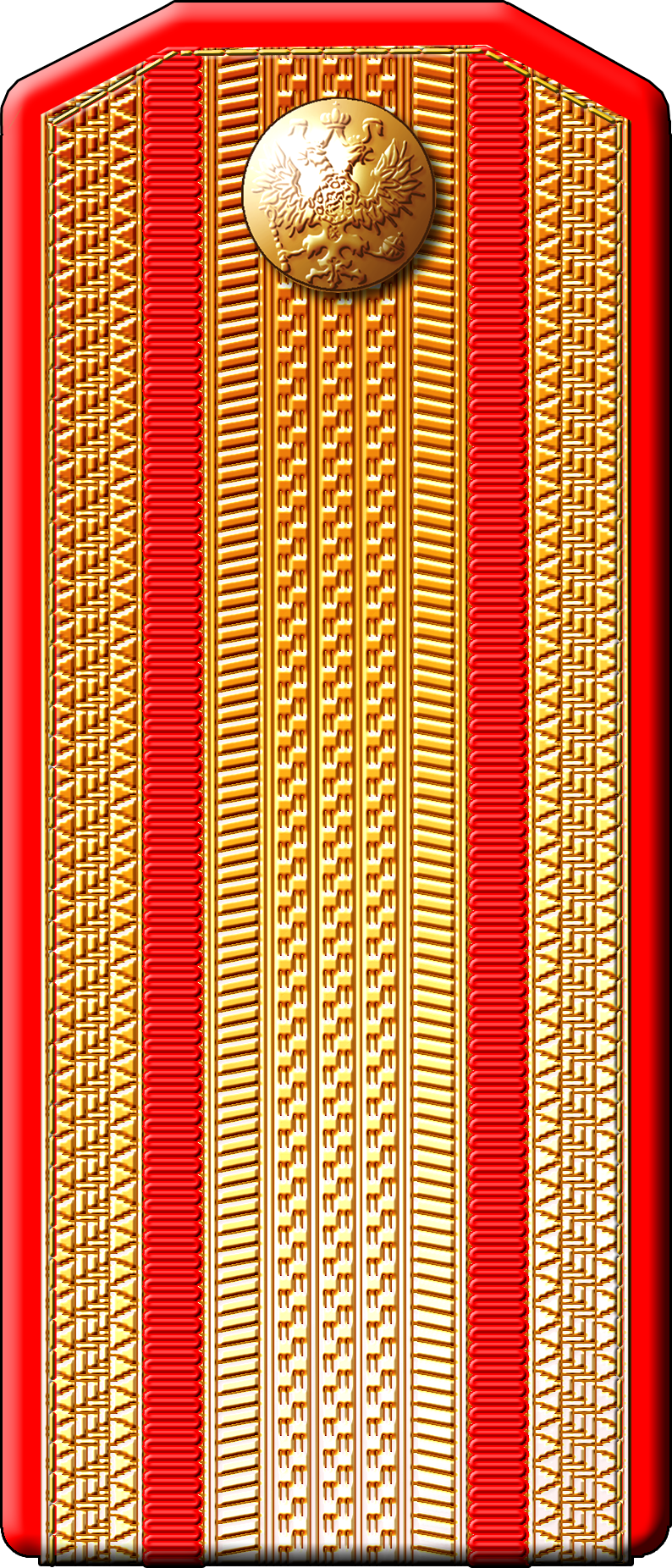
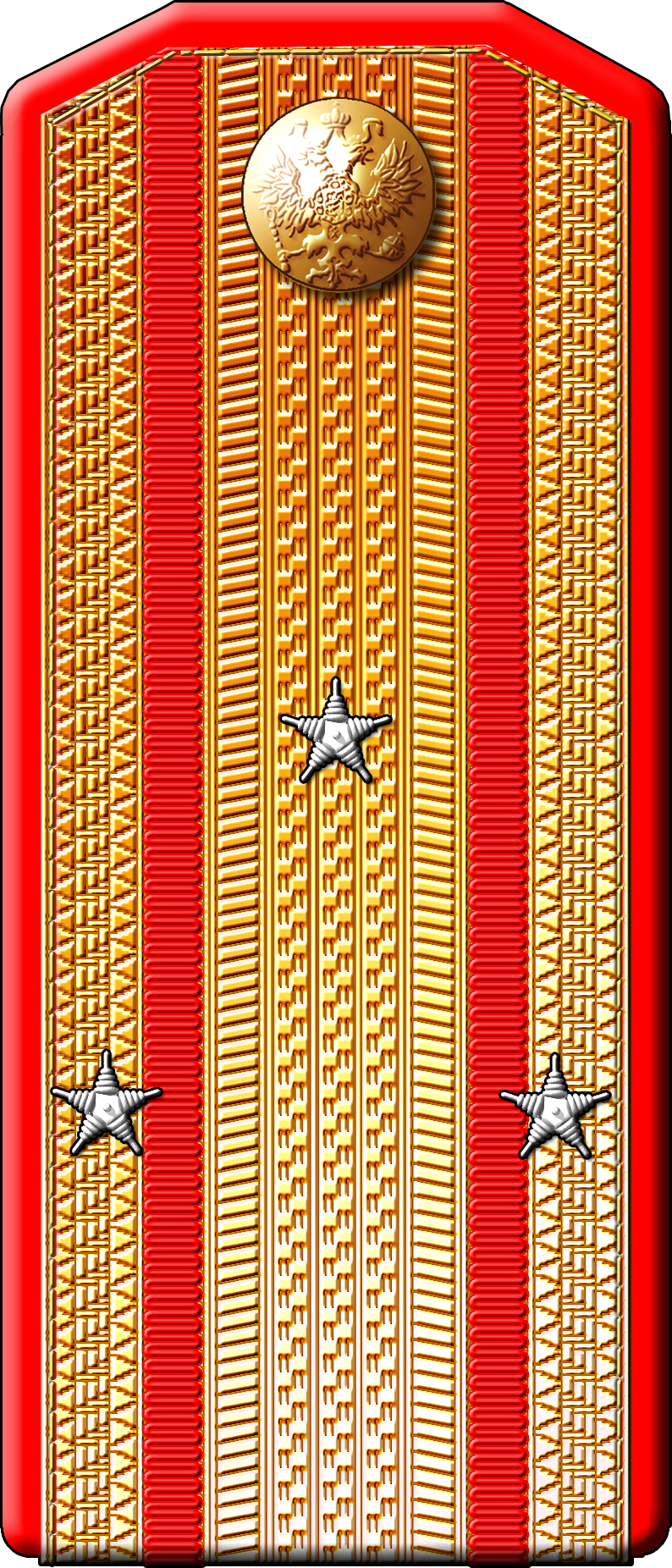
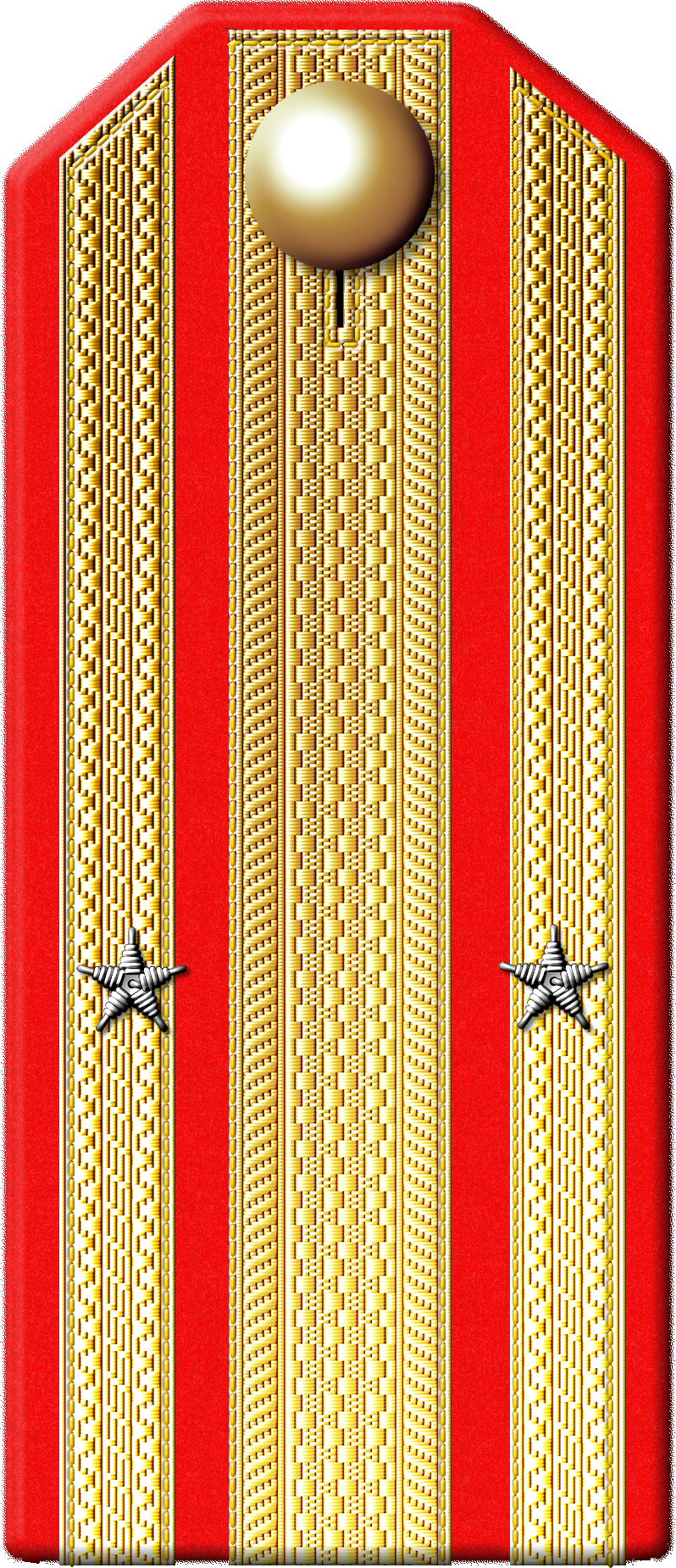
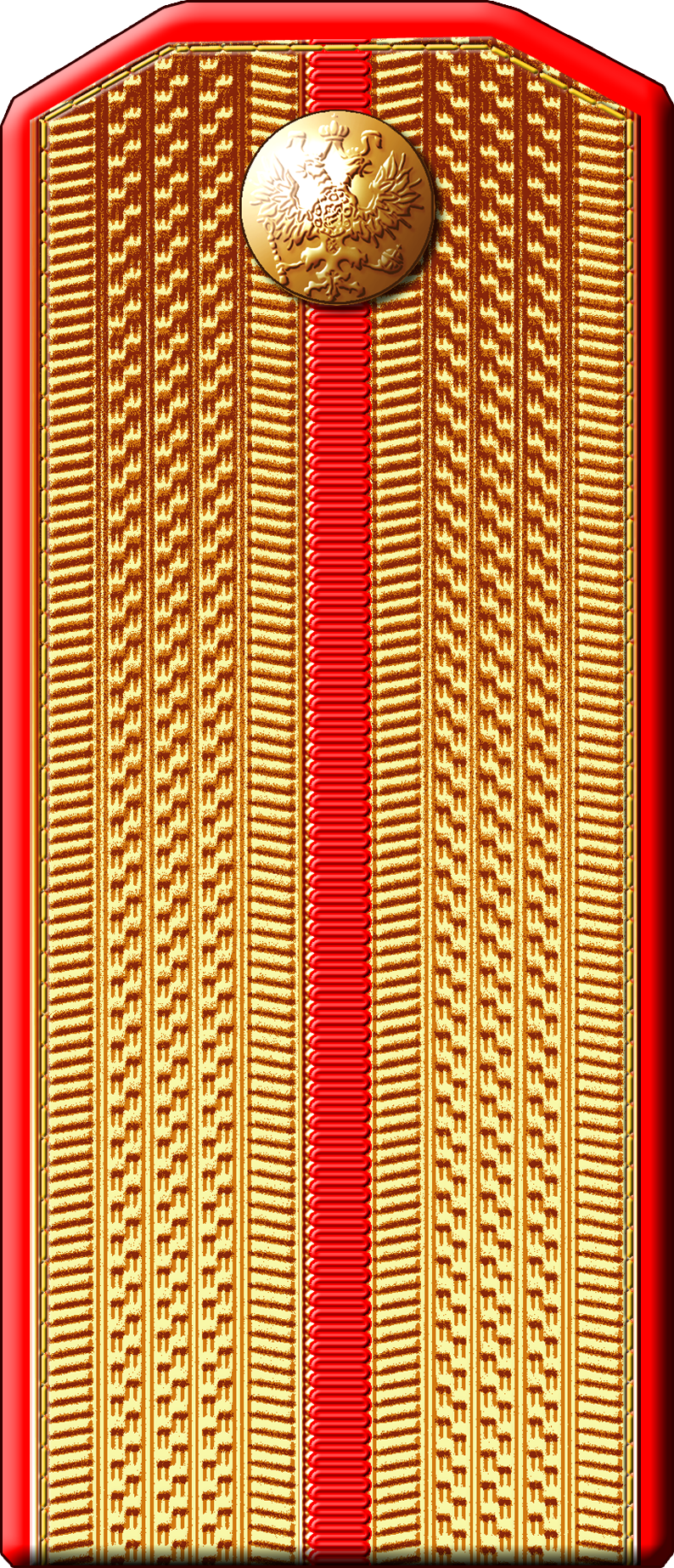
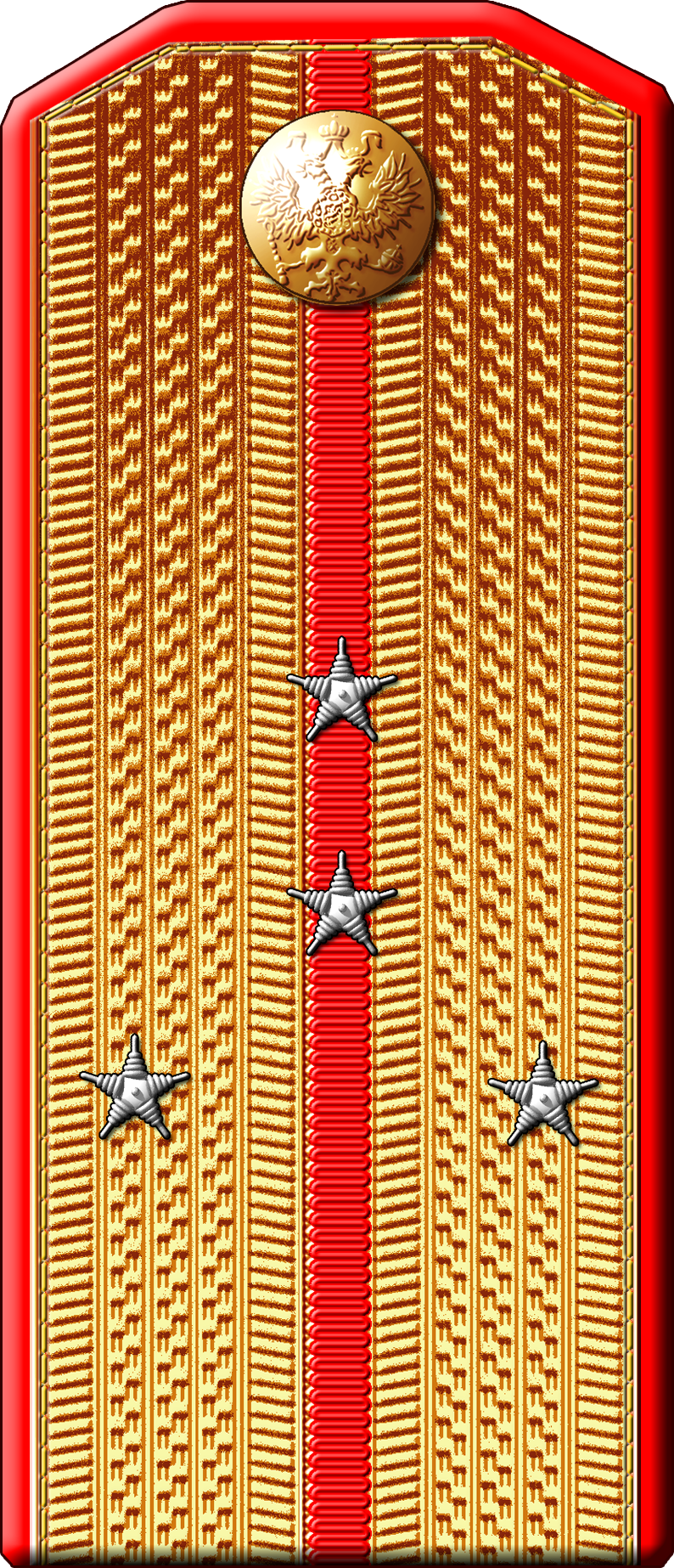
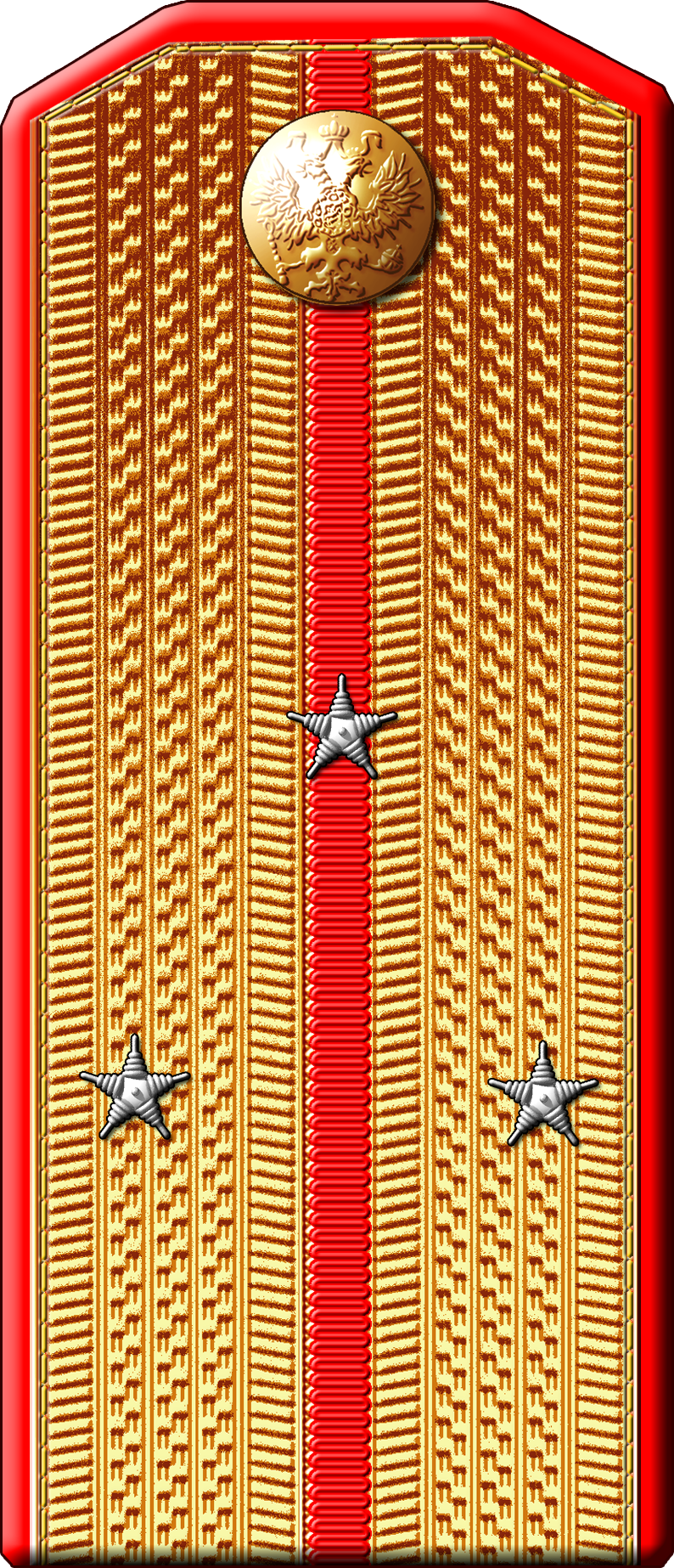
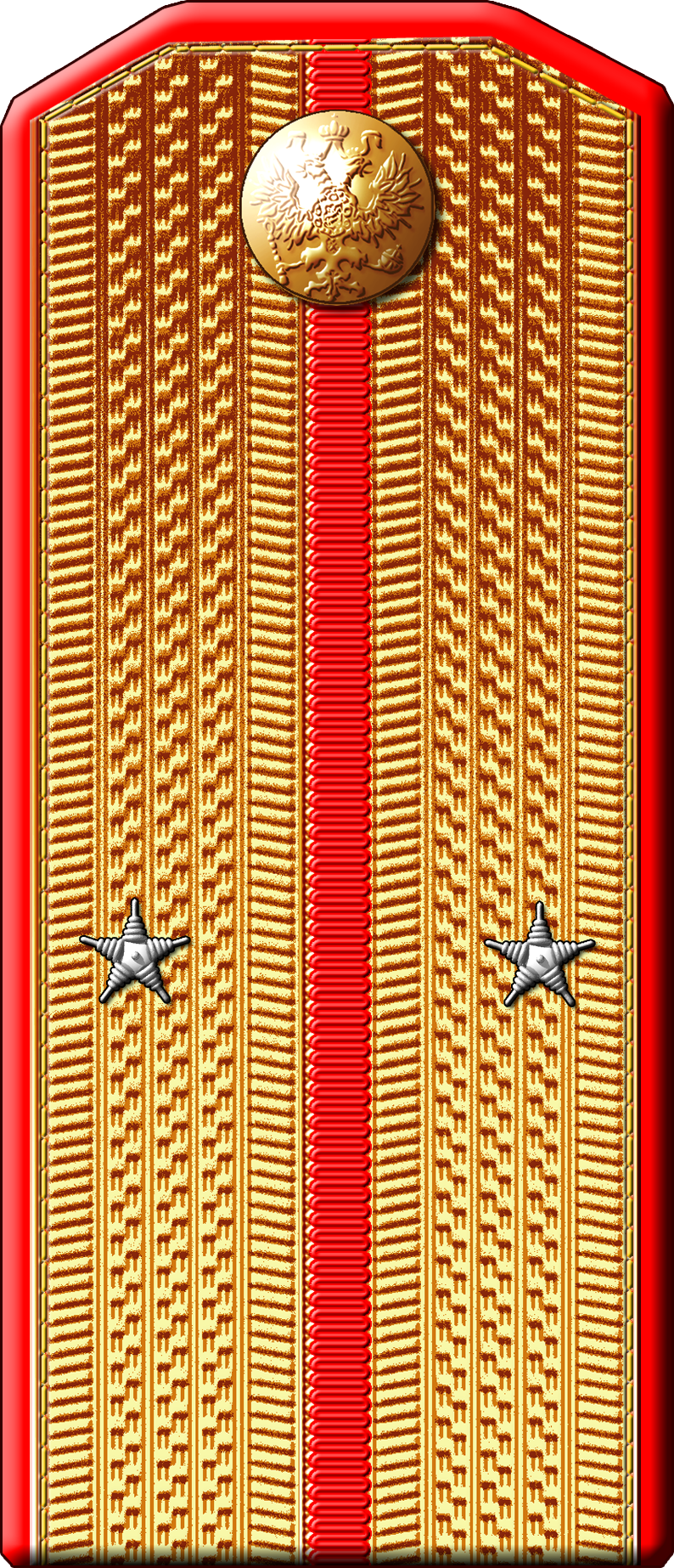
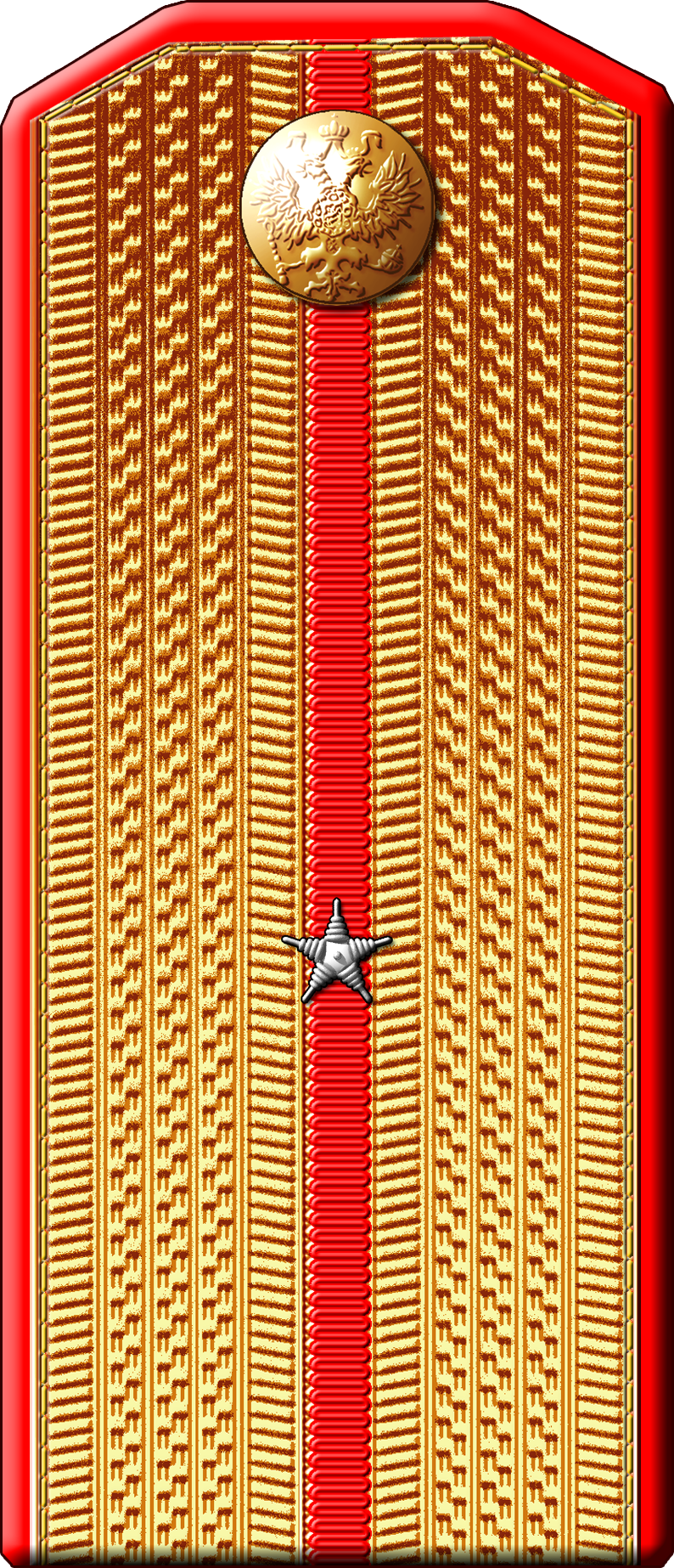
Description	Officer ranks
Years	1857–1904			1880–1884	1857–1904
Epaulettes
Years	1857–1917	1904–1917
Epaulettes
Description	Rank insignia
Shoulderboards
Rank	Major general	Colonel	Lieutenant colonel	Major	Captain	Staff captain	Lieutenant	Junior lieutenant	Ensign
Type	Generals	Senior officers			Junior officers

==== Enlisted and NCOs ====
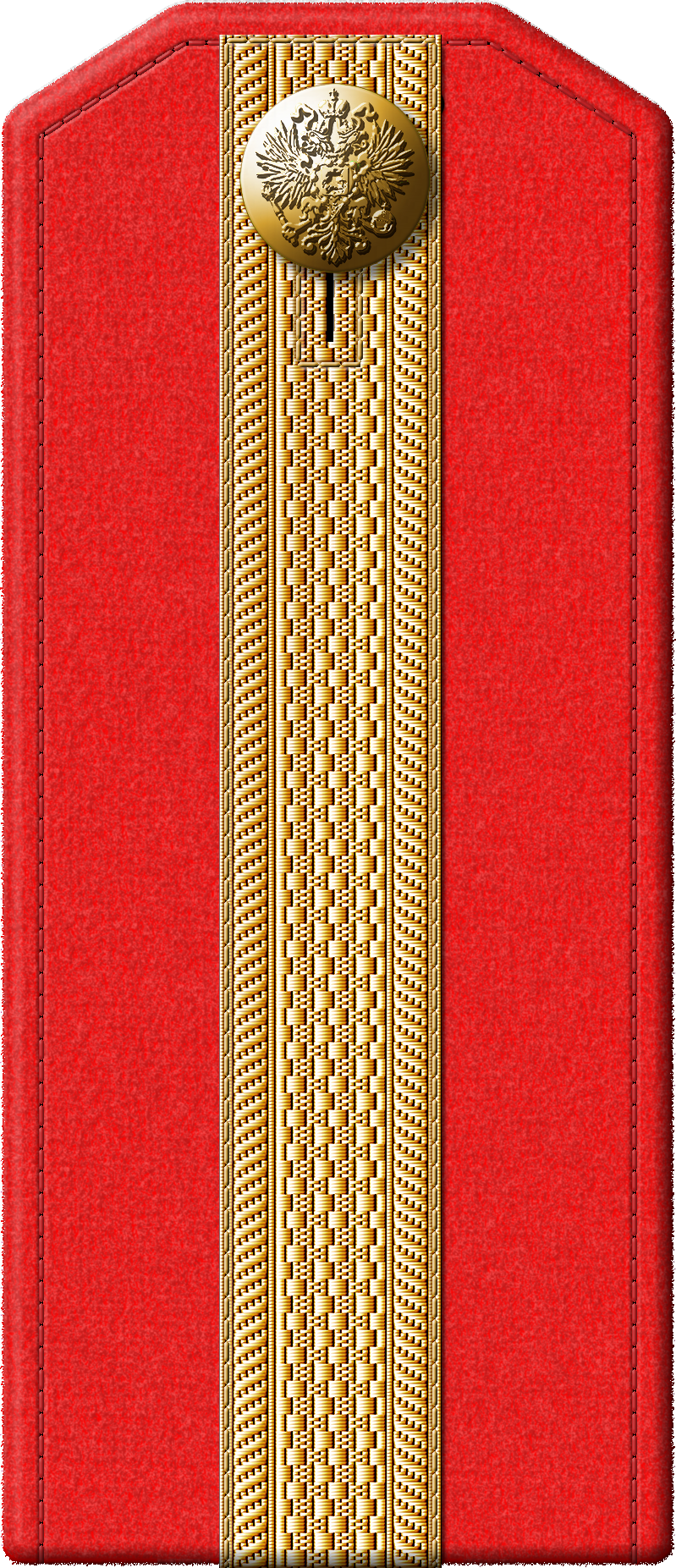
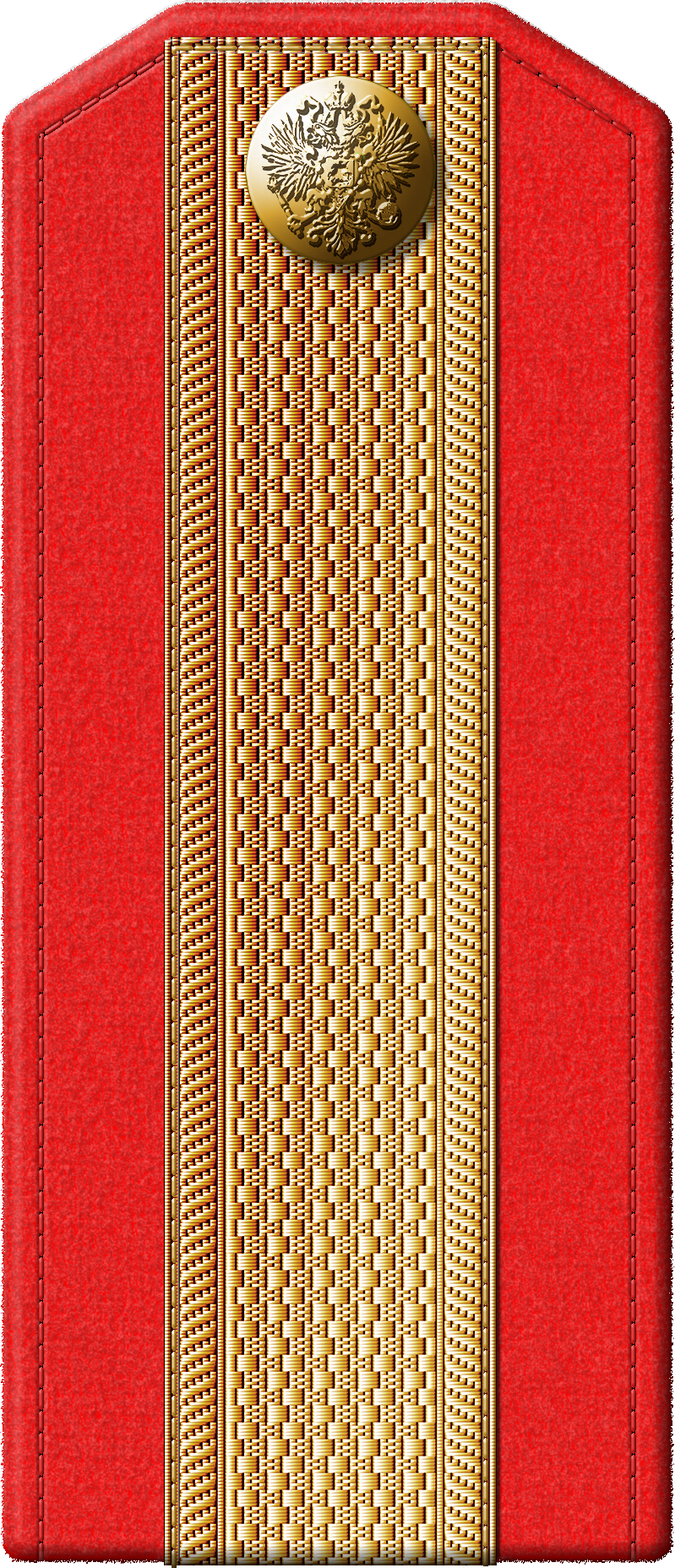
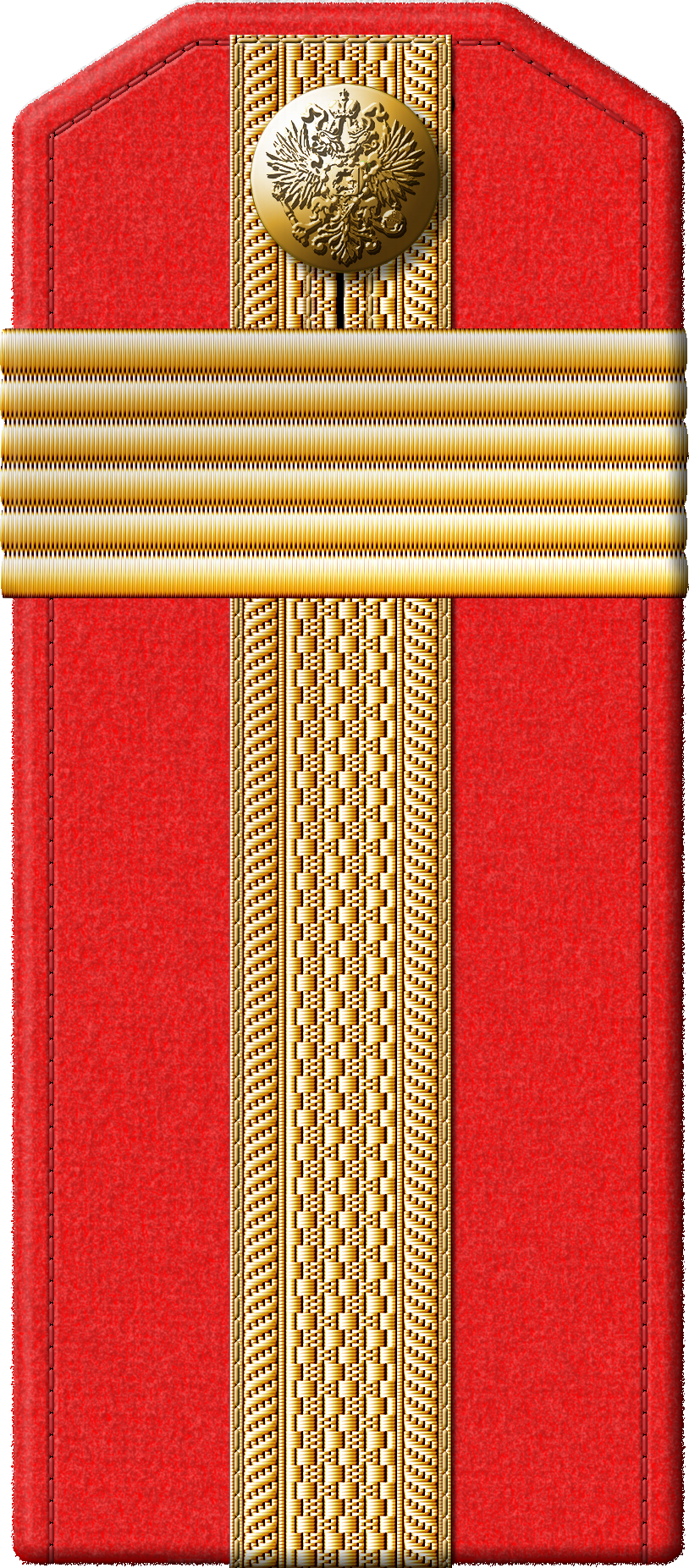
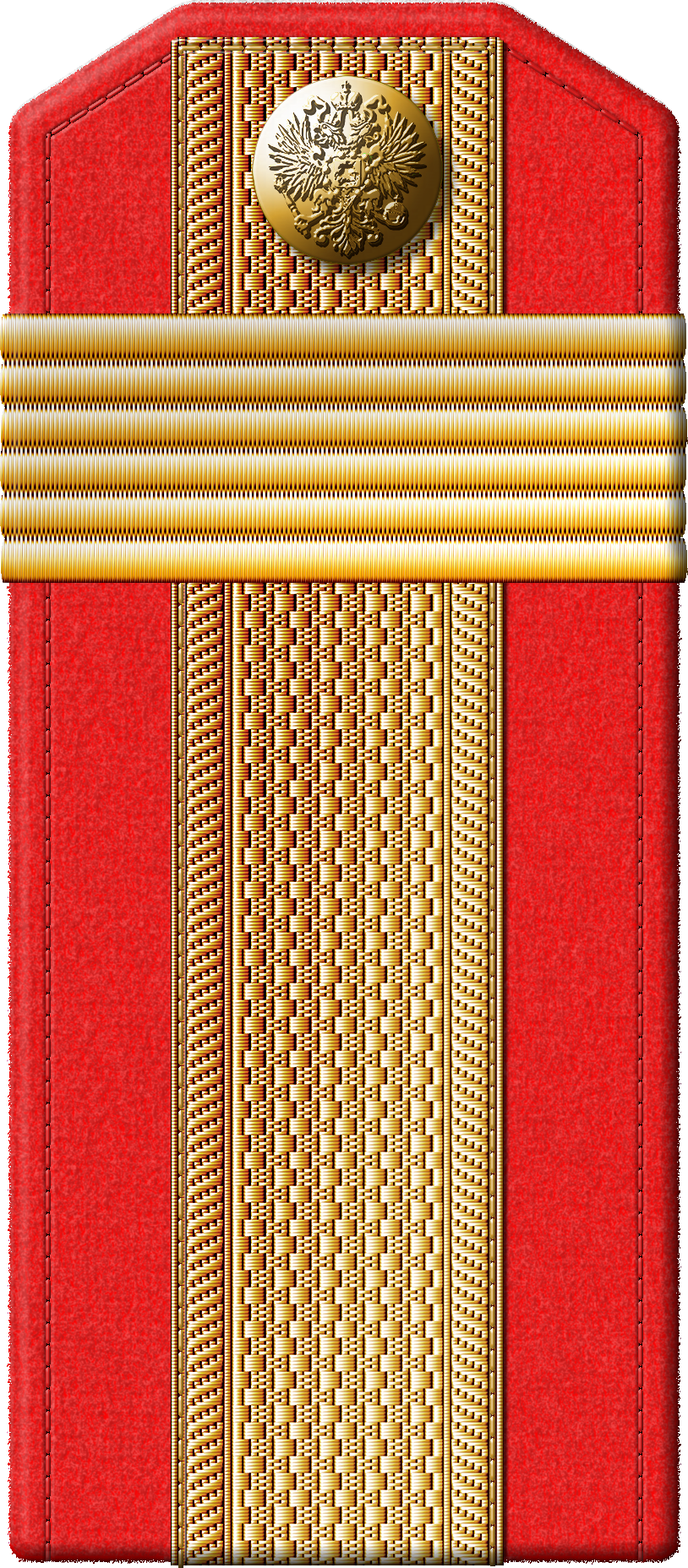
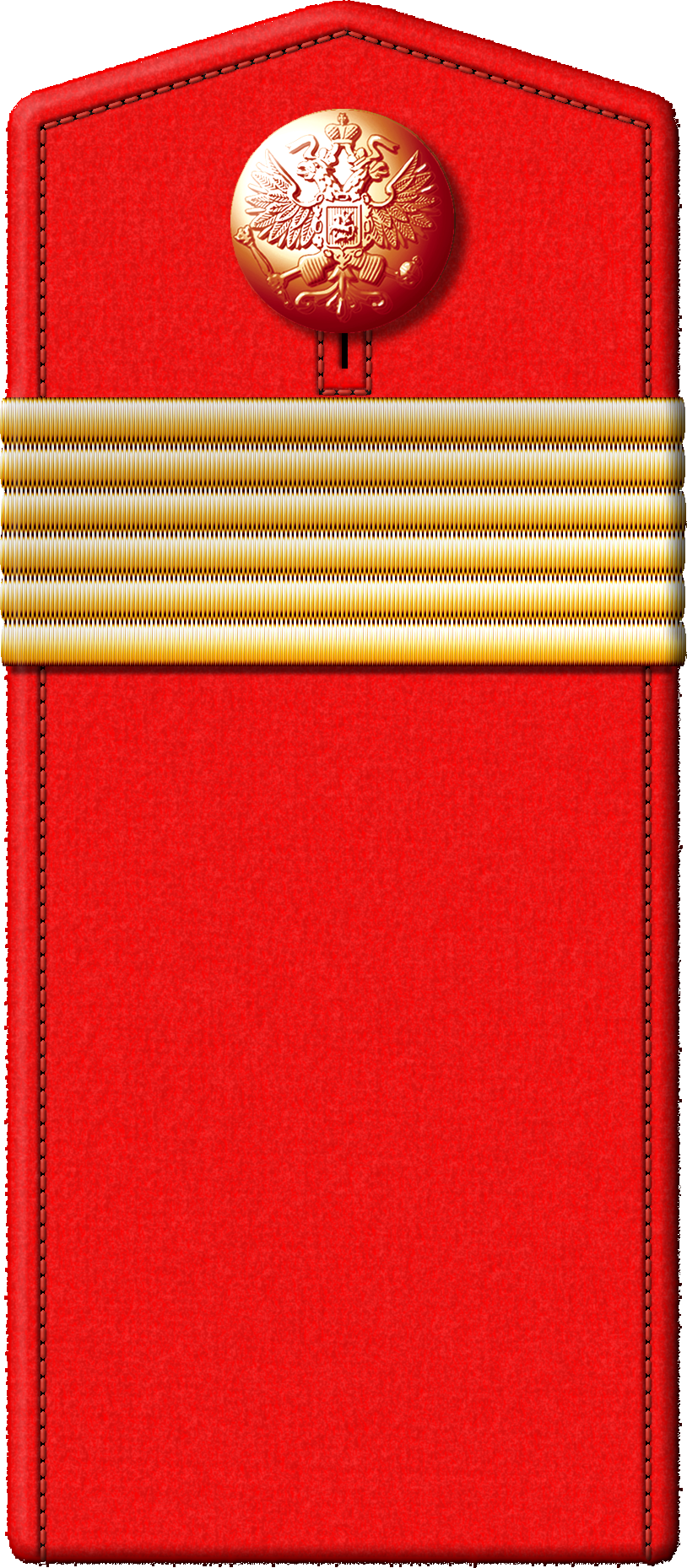
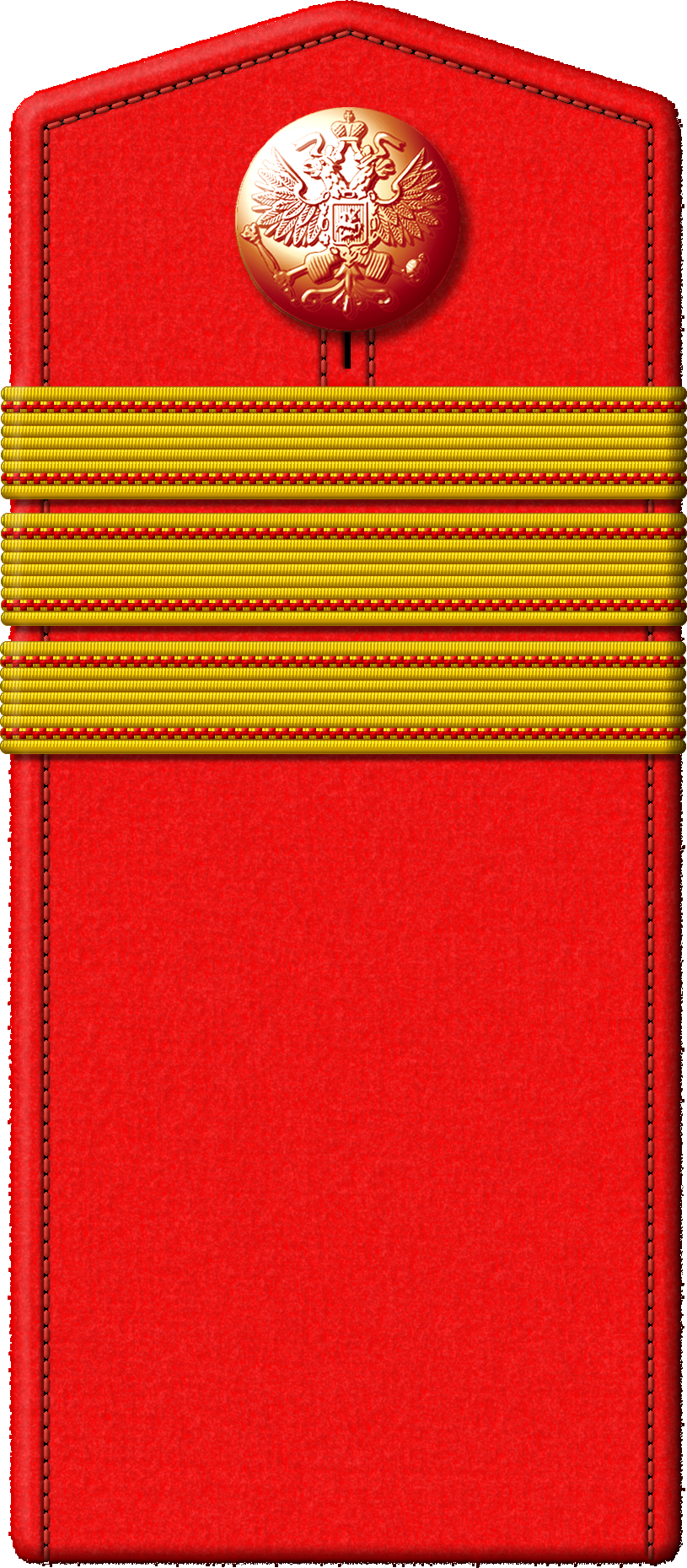
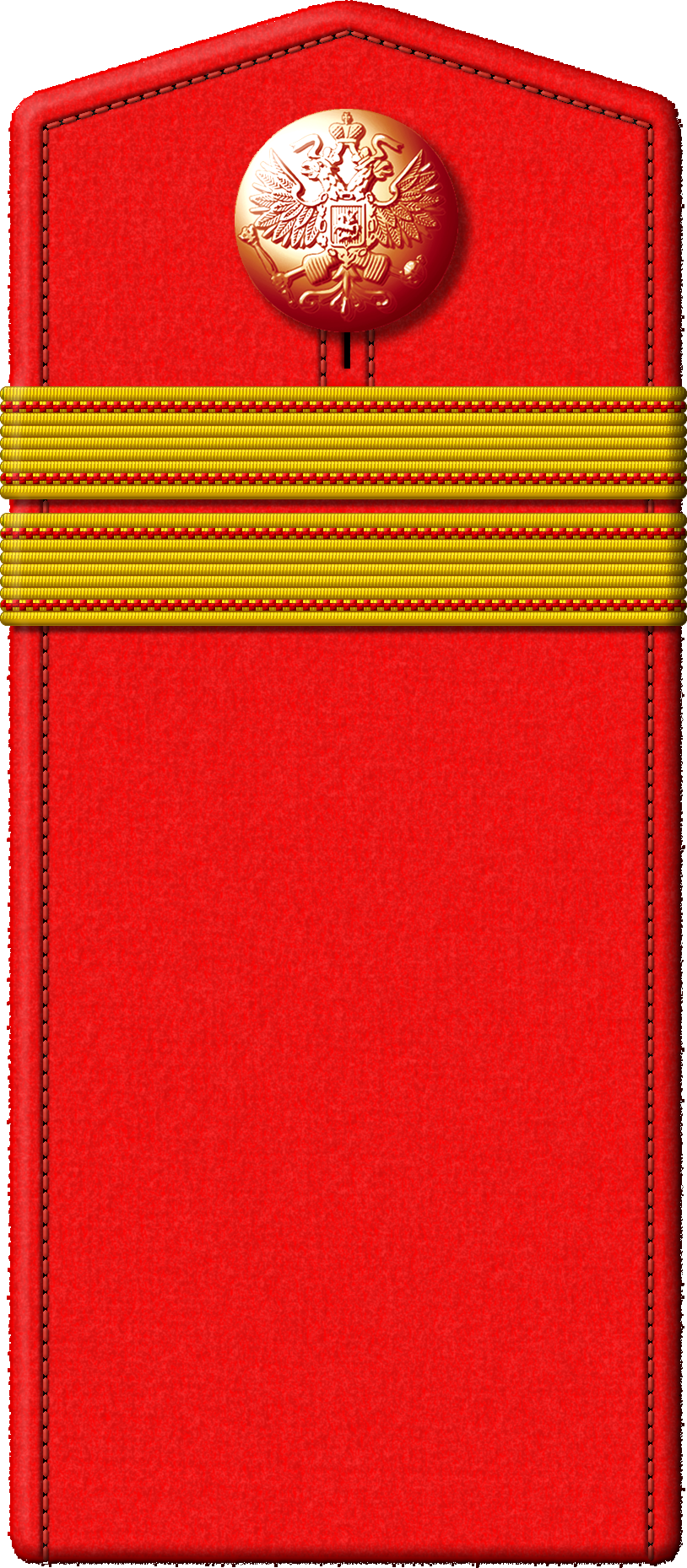
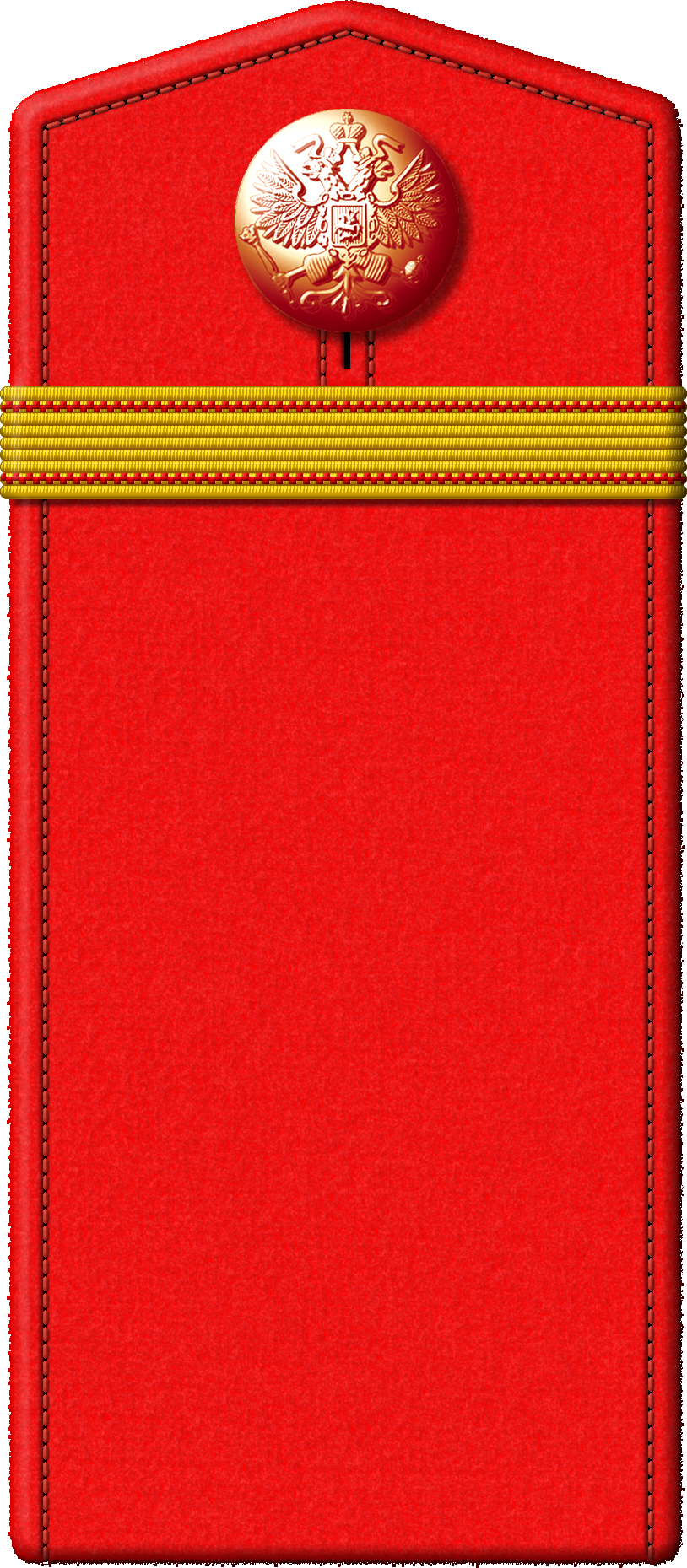
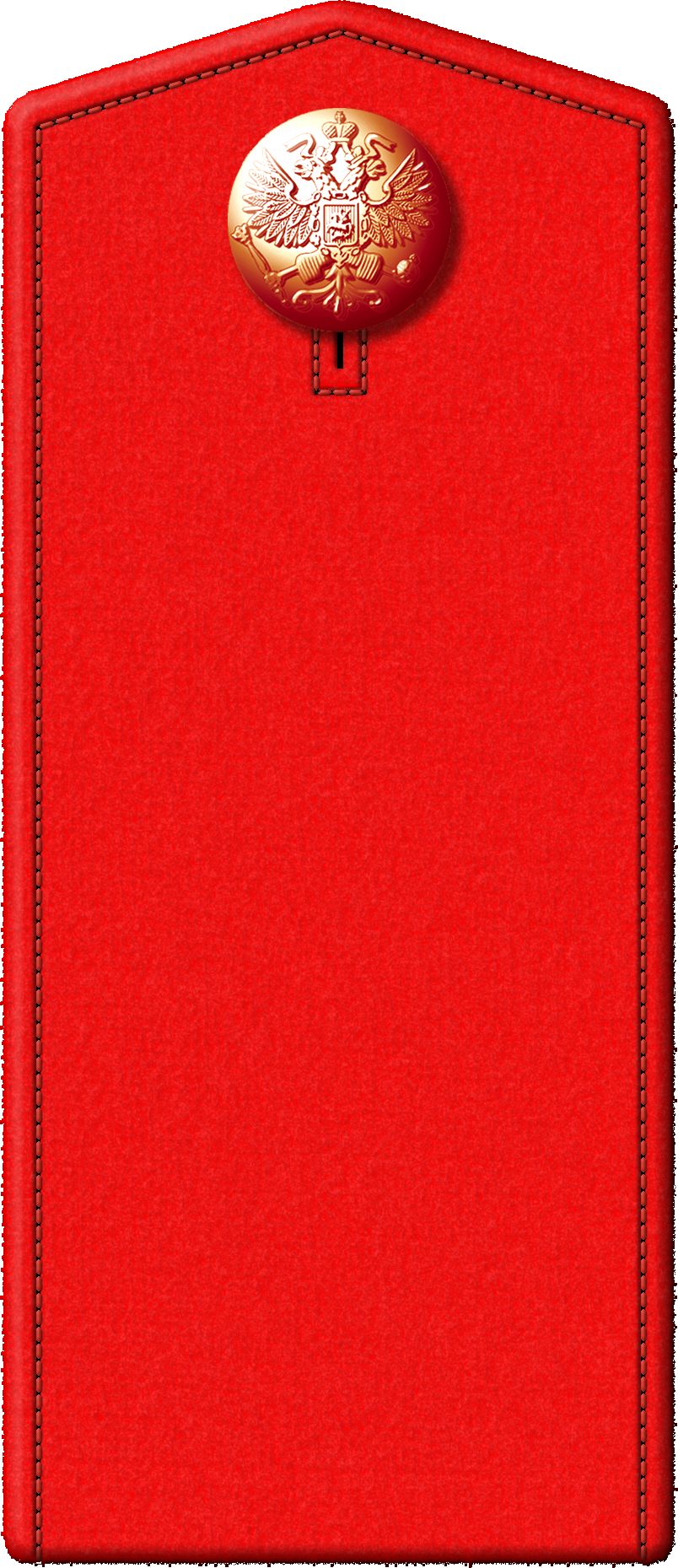
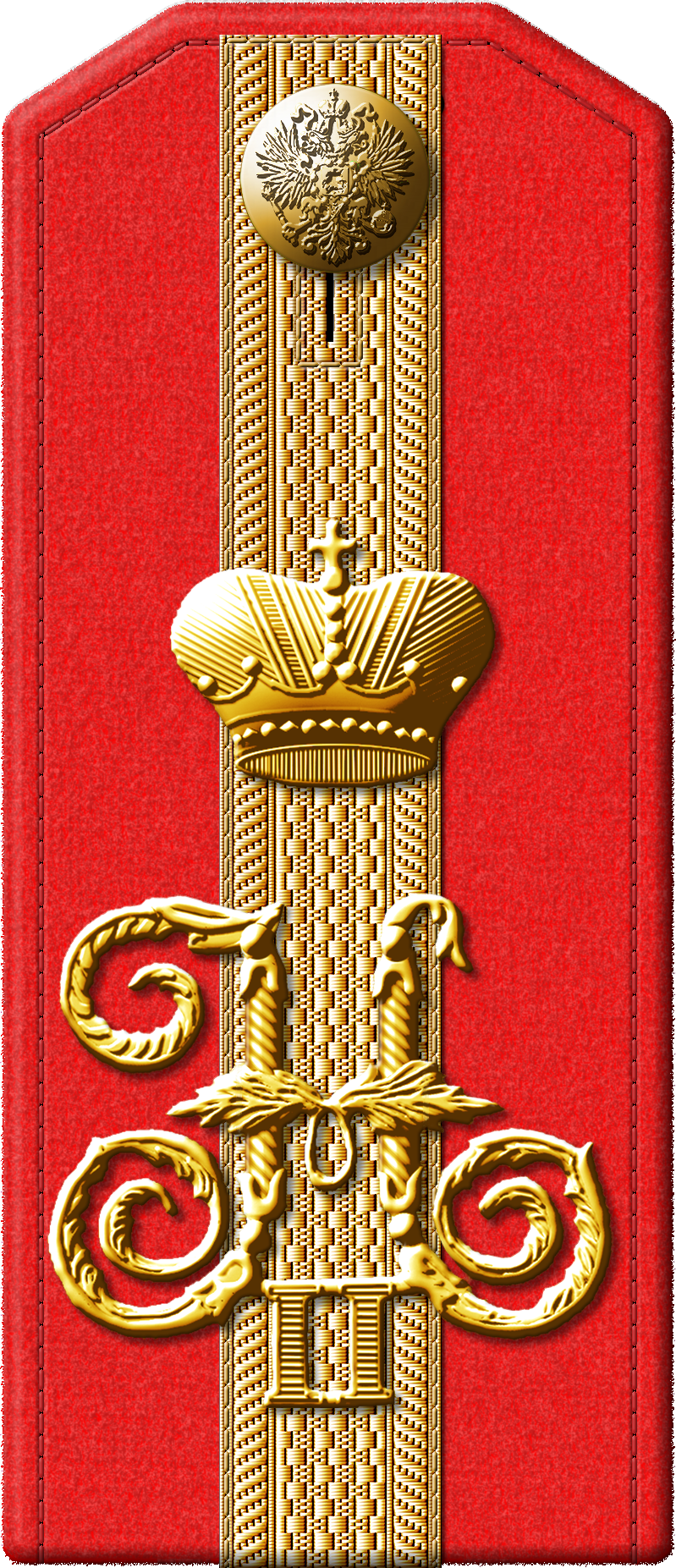
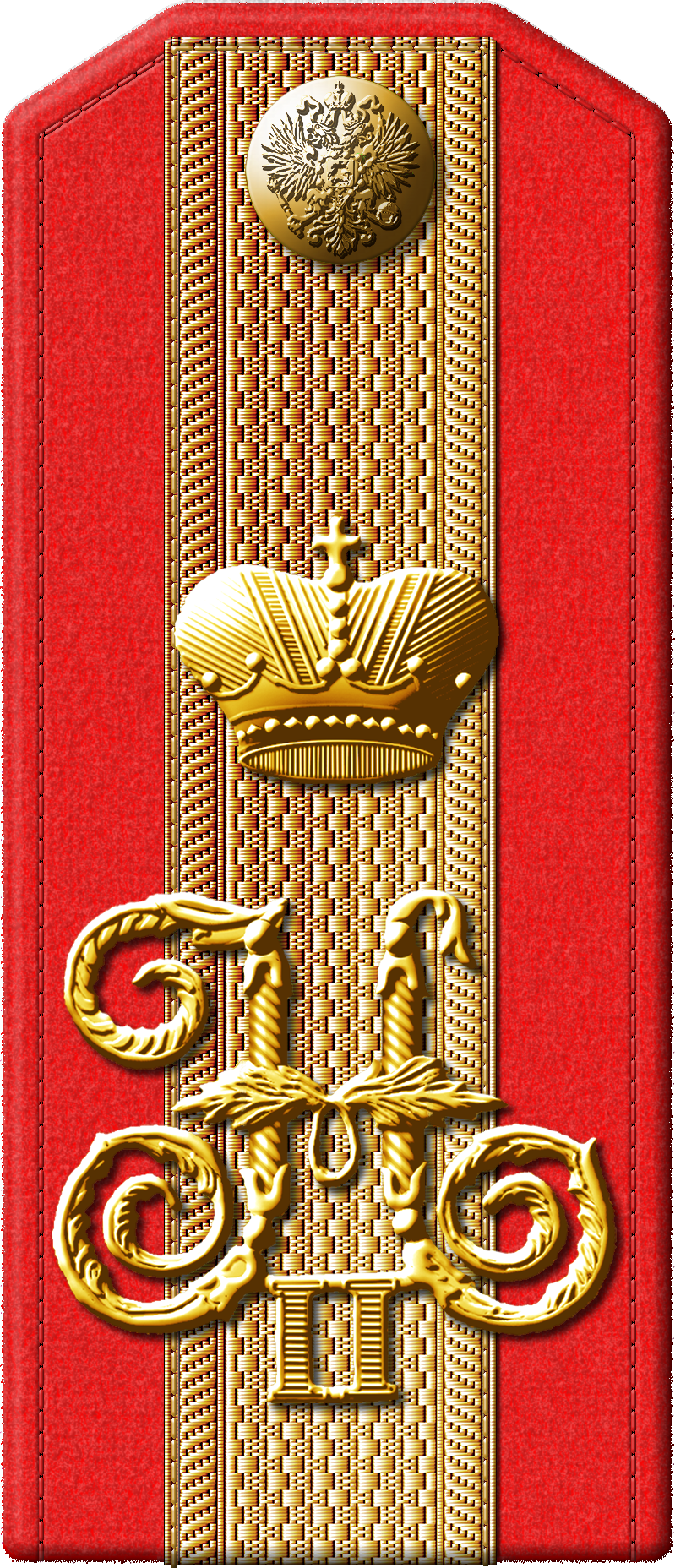
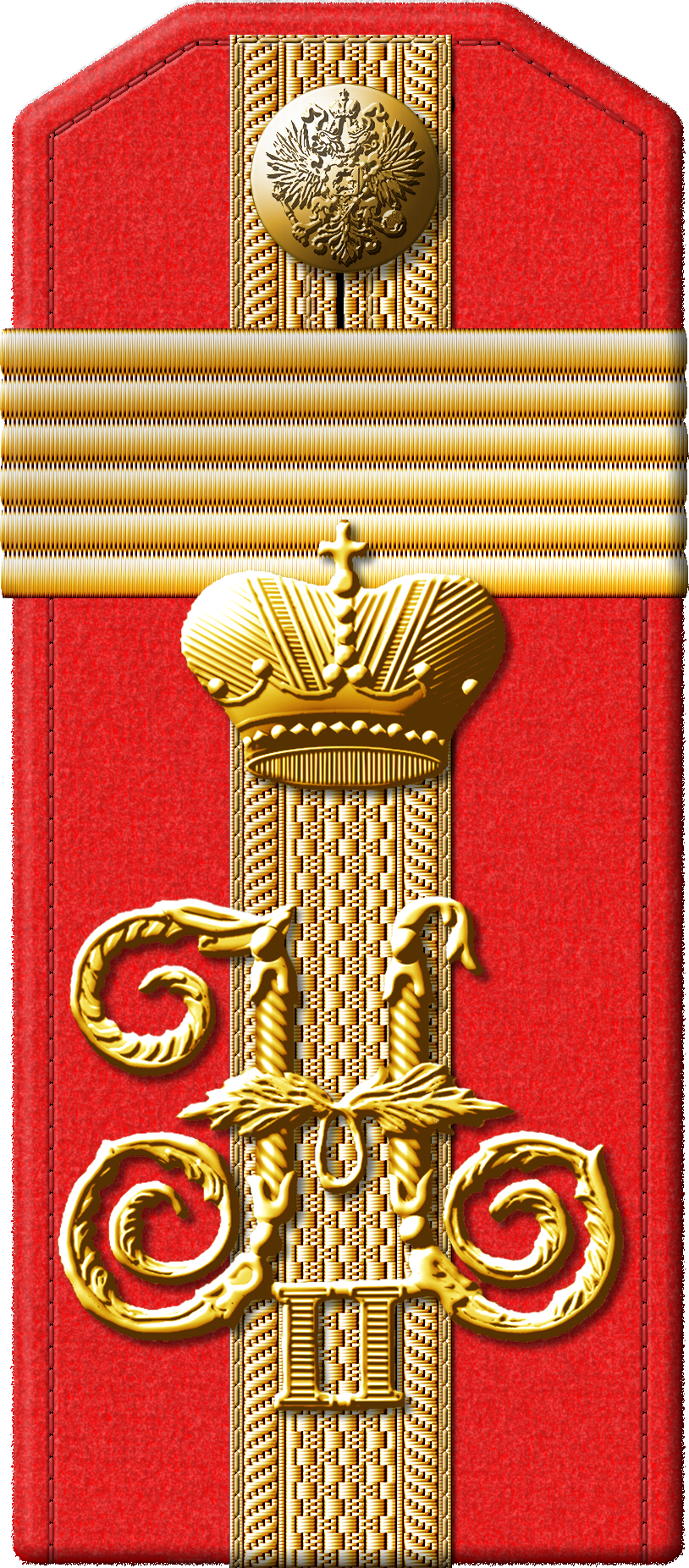
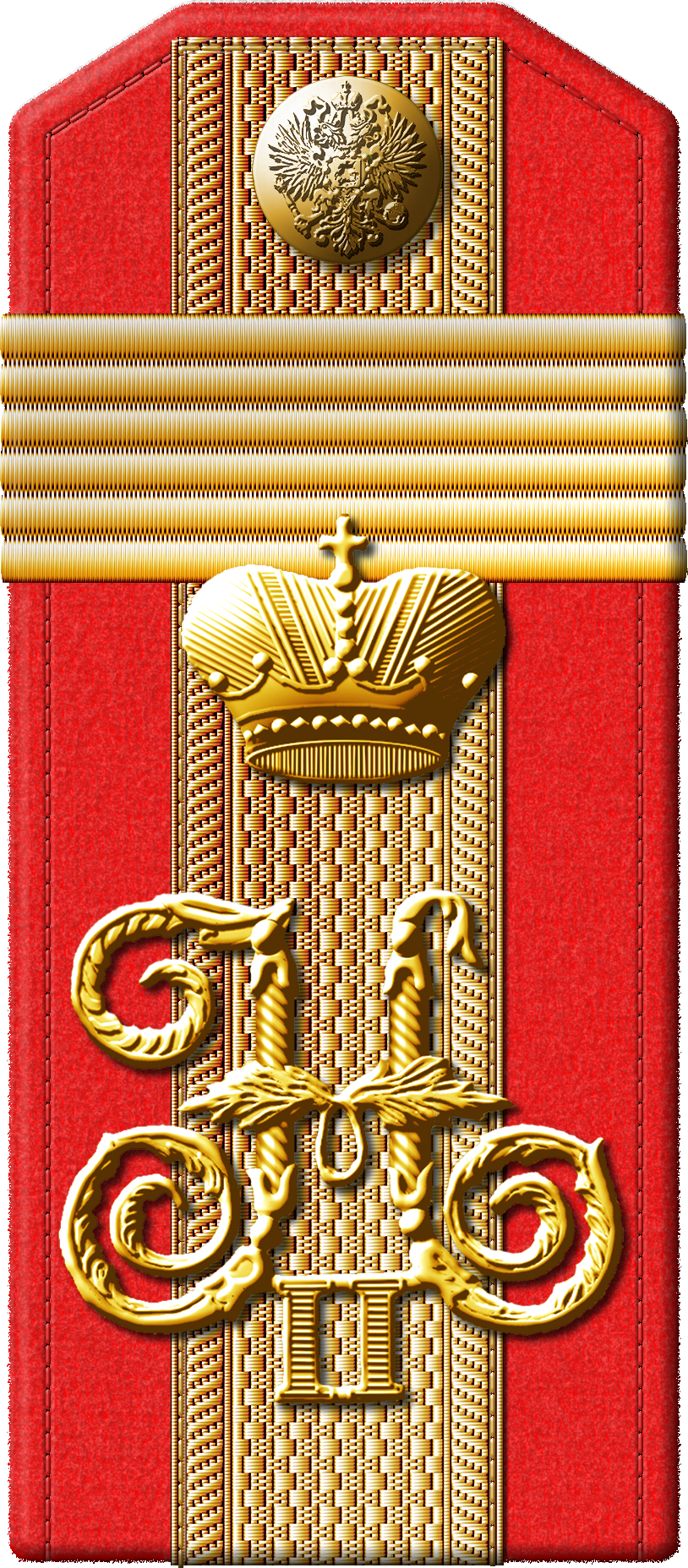
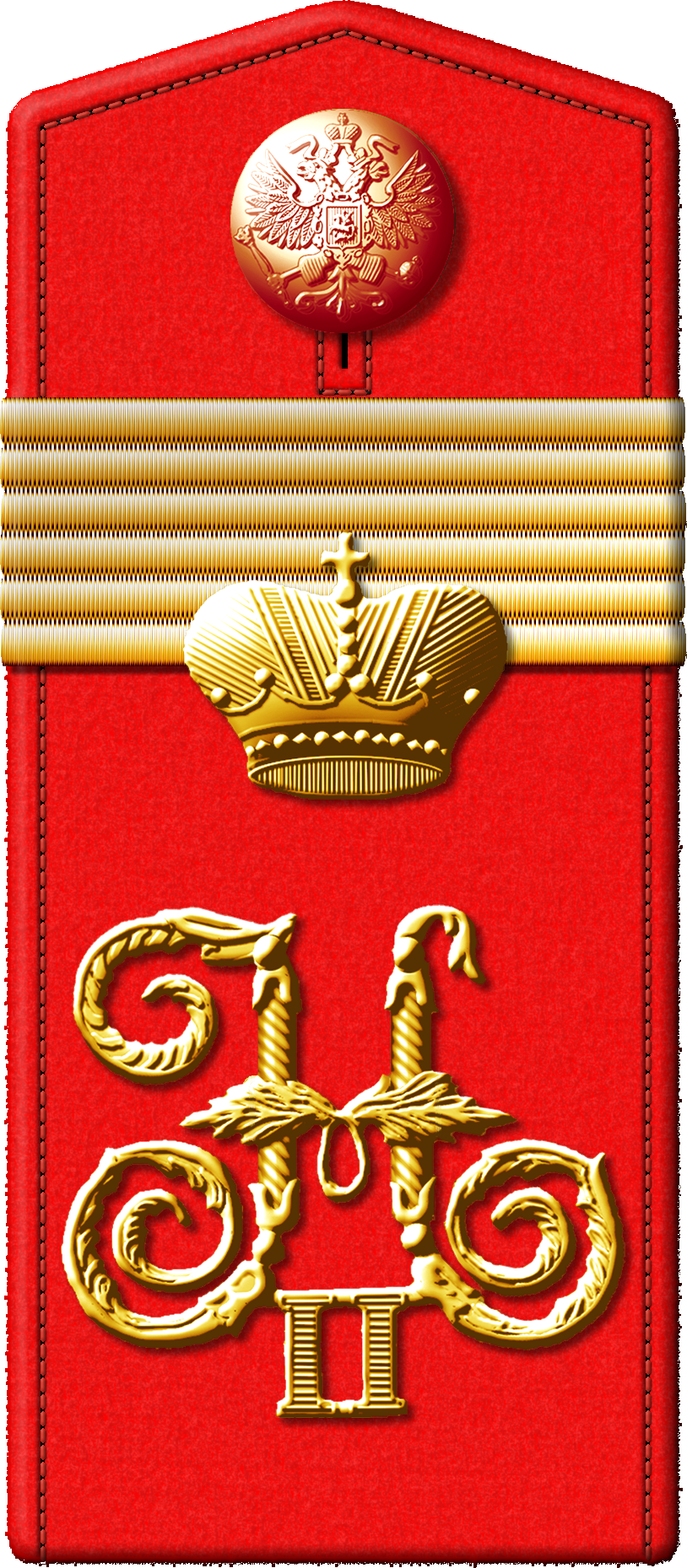
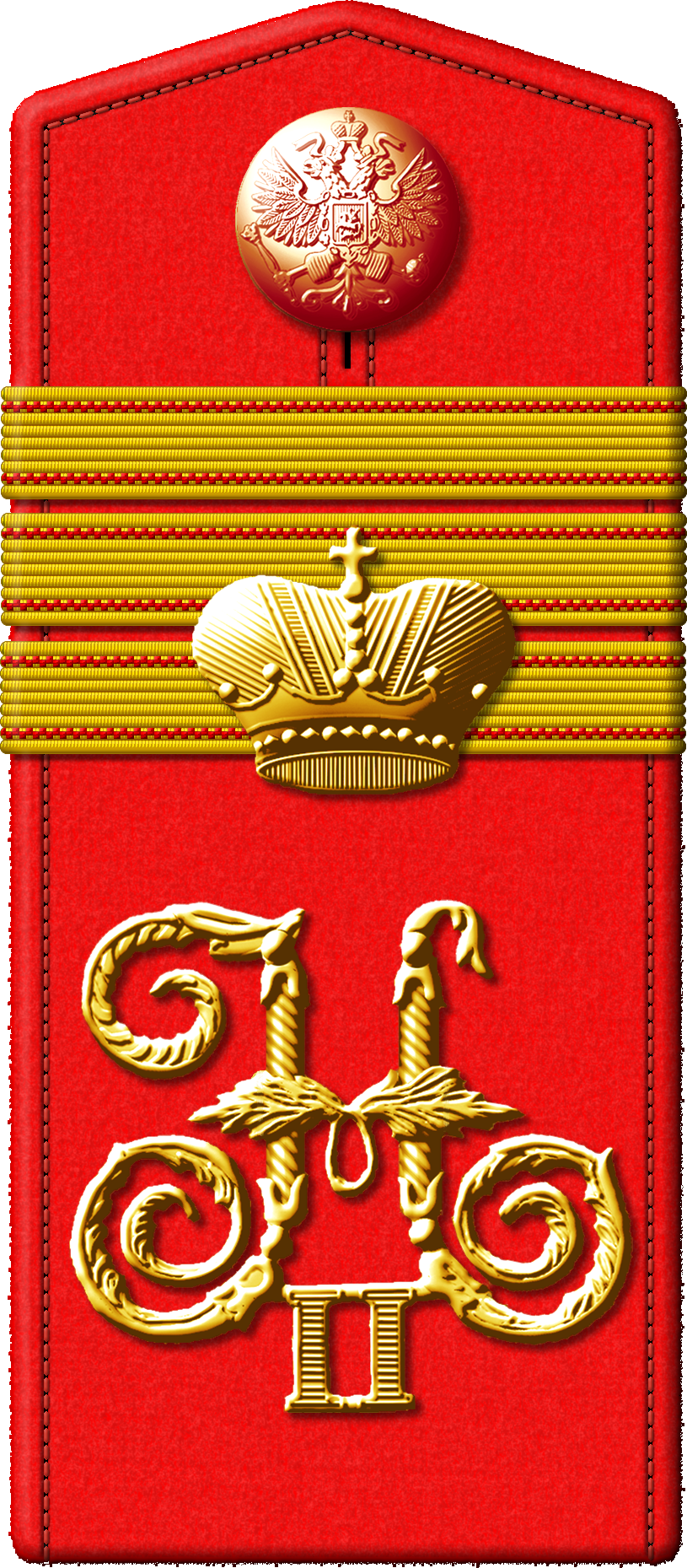
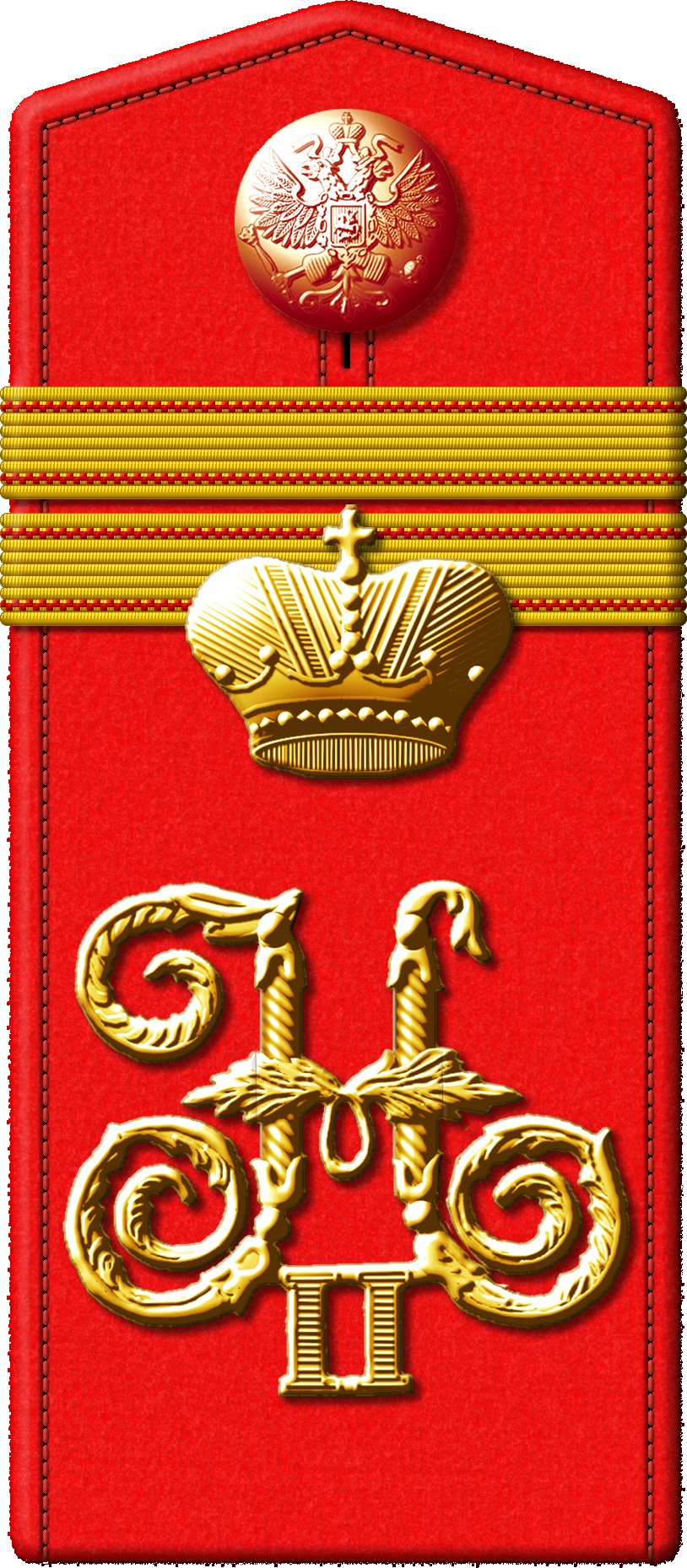
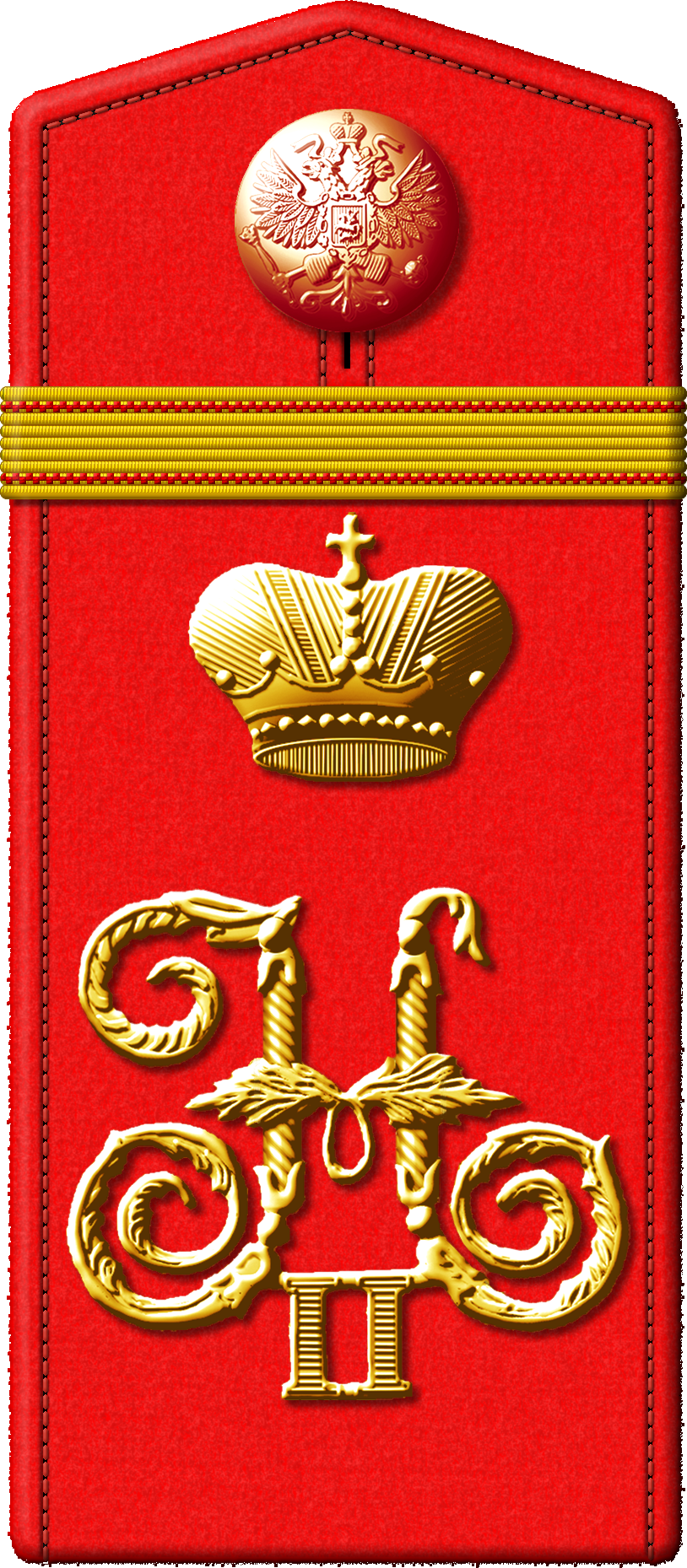
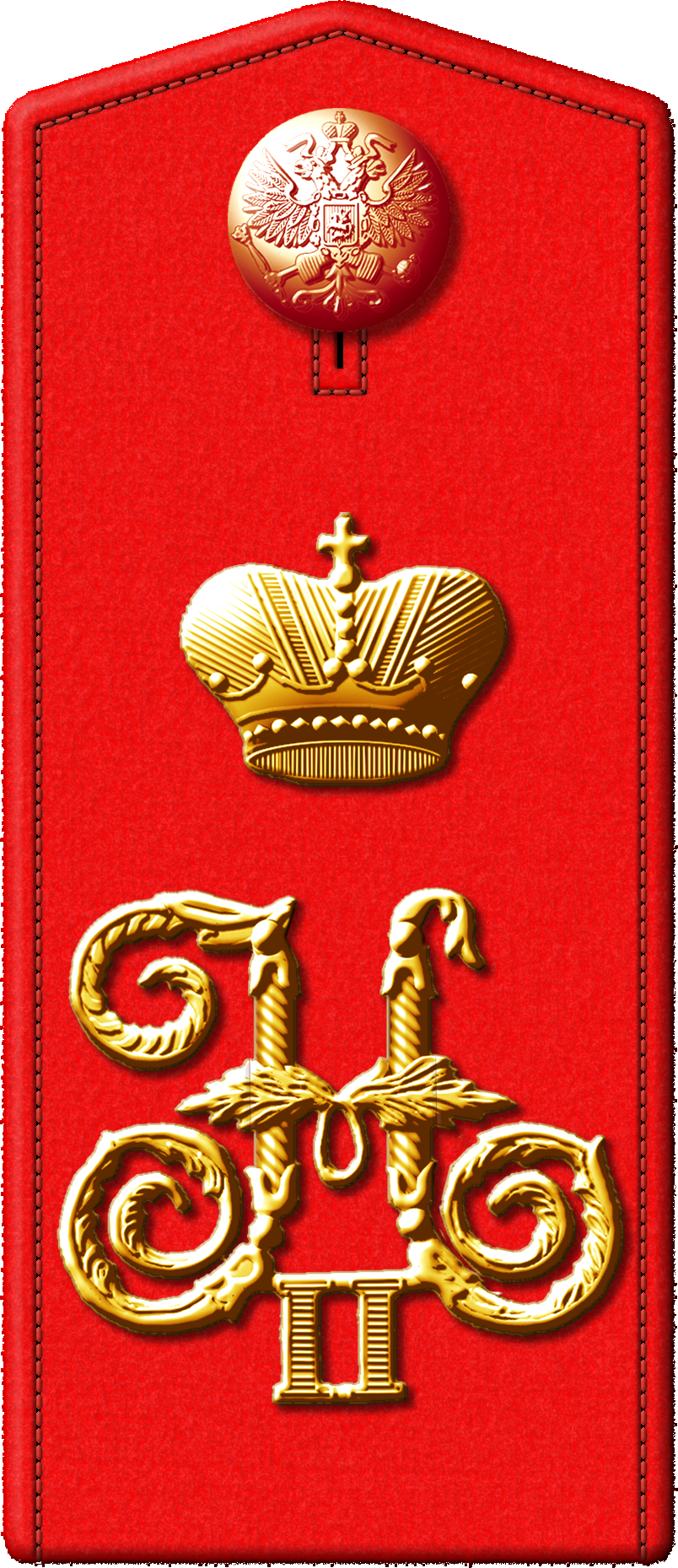
Description	Rank insignia for 1907–1917
Shoulderboards
Description	Rank insignia for 1894–1917
Shoulderboards
Ranks	Sub-Ensign	Subensign serving as Feldwebel	Feldwebel	Senior unteroffizier	Junior unteroffizier	Corporal	Private
Type	NCOs					Enlisted

== Sailors of the Preobrazhensky ==
An unusual feature of the Preobrazhensky Regiment was that it included a small detachment of sailors. Intended to commemorate a period during the reign of Peter the Great when the regiment served on board ship as temporary marines, this unit provided rowers for members of the Imperial Family when embarked on ceremonial barges on the Neva. The Preobrazhensky sailors wore naval dress, distinguished by orange stripes on the neck-collar.

== Preobrazhensky March ==
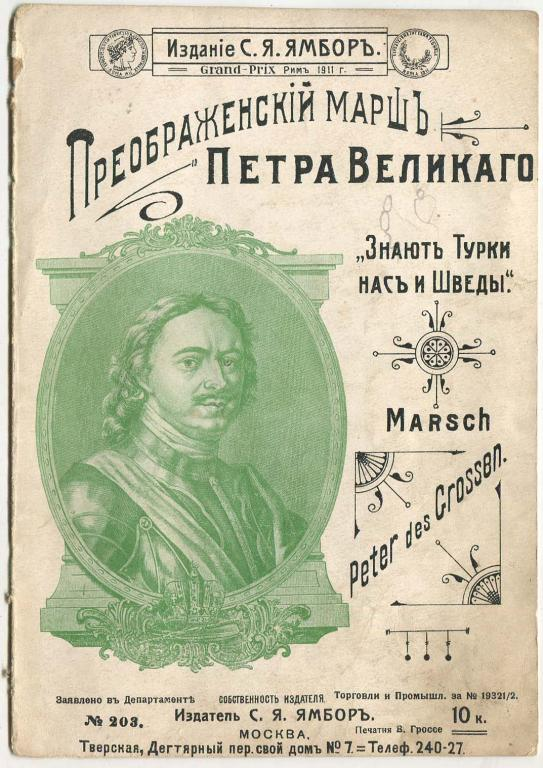
Preobrazhnesky March of Peter The Great, 1911

The "Preobrazhensky Regiment March" (Russian: Марш Лейб-гвардии Преображенского полка) is one of the most famous Russian military marches. It was used as an unofficial national anthem in imperial times. The march has been often used in modern Russia, particularly in the annual Victory Day Parade for the trooping the colours and the inspection of troops.

The March was used since 1725, and was made in reference to the role of the regiment in the 1709 Battle of Poltava. The composer is not known. In 1816 the March of the Preobrazhensky Life Guards Regiment was entered into the official catalog military music and later became known as the main march of the Russian Empire, being played at parades, other official functions of the Imperial family, and at receptions of foreign ambassadors. After the Russian Revolution it was used as an unofficial Russian anthem by some White émigrés.

Before World War I it was used as the presentation march in several military formations in Prussia Since 1964 it has been used as the slow march of the Royal Marines.

Several lyrics are known for the march.

== Notable people who served in the Preobrazhensky Regiment ==
- Abram Petrovich Gannibal (1696–1781)
- Gavrila Derzhavin (1743–1816)
- Modest Mussorgsky (1839–1881)
- Alexander Kutepov (1882–1930)

== See also ==
- 154th Preobrazhensky Independent Commandant's Regiment
- Russian Imperial Guard

== Sources ==
- Massie, Robert K. (2011) [1980]. Peter the Great: His Life and World. New York: Random House. ISBN 978-0-307-81723-5.
- Wildman, Allan (1987). The End of the Russian Imperial Army: The Road to Soviet Power and Peace. Vol. II. Princeton: Princeton University Press. ISBN 0-691-05504-1.
