= Hetman Bohdan Khmelnytsky Regiment =

Hetman Bohdan Khmelnytsky Regiment is the name of:

- 1st Bohdan Khmelnytskyi Ukrainian regiment unit of Ukrainian People's Army in times of First liberation struggle in 1917.
- Hetman Bohdan Khmelnytsky Presidential Regiment modern unit of Ukrainian Armed Forces, household troops for President of Ukraine.

== See also ==
- Bohdan Khmelnytsky
- Bohdan Khmelnytskyi 14th Radio Technical Brigade (Ukraine), a modern unit of Ukrainian Air Force
- Bohdan Khmelnytskyi National Academy of the State Border Service of Ukraine, the academy of the State Border Service of Ukraine
- Bohdan Khmelnytskyi Military Institute of Missile Troops and Artillery, the former higher military educational institution of Ukraine, 1994–2007
