= Albert Jacques Verly =

Jacques Albert Verly
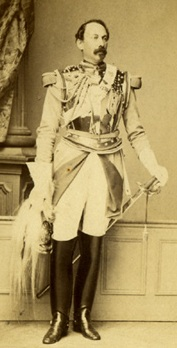
- Colonel Baron Jacques Albert Verly, commanding officer of the Cent-Gardes.
- Born: 5 January 1815; Kingston, Jamaica
- Died: 25 July 1883 (aged 68); Paris, France
- Occupation: Commander

Jacques Albert Verly was born in Kingston, Jamaica, on 5 January 1815, was a French commanding officer of Emperor Napoleon III, accompanying him in many battles, and a member of the Cent-gardes Squadron created in May 1854. He died in Paris on 25 July 1883.

== Biography ==
Jacques Albert Verly was the son of a plantation owner of Saint-Domingue. Orphan at age 6, he studied in France and then enlisted in the cavalry in 1833. Becoming officer in 1841, he was appointed Lieutenant to the 6th Chasseurs Regiment in July 1843, and Lieutenant in 1847. In 1848 he becomes commanding officer of the armed forces of the Alps. Promoted to captain in 1852, he moved on to the Regiment of Guides, embryo of the guard which provided security for the Prince President. This contact with the future Emperor favors him and then he moves on to the Cent-gardes Squadron.

In the middle of his social life, richly married, he took part in military campaigns accompanying the Emperor Napoleon III. He was seriously wounded in the arm on 24 June 1859 at Solferino. Lieutenant Colonel in October 1859, and then again Colonel on 26 October 1864, he is kept commanding the Cent Guards as a sign of imperial favor. He is made Baron of the empire in 1867, Commander of the Legion of Honor in 1869, receiving numerous foreign decorations thereafter. Despite being linked to the splendor of the empire, he suddenly falls prisoner of the emperor in Sedan. Verly is set to compulsory retirement by the republic in October 1870.

== See also ==
- Louis Lepic
- Jean Jules Bousson
- Arnaud Ernest Junqua
