= Jean-Ernest Ducos de La Hitte =

French major general and politician

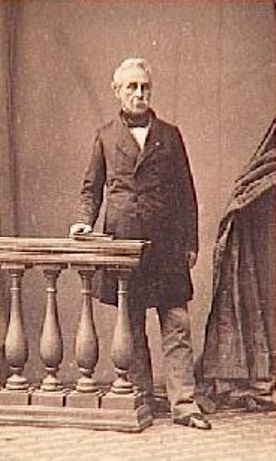
Jean-Ernest Ducos de La Hitte

Jean Ernest Ducos de La Hitte, Viscount (5 September 1789 – 22 September 1878), was a French major general and politician. He was a senator, Foreign Minister, and the implementer of the La Hitte system of rifled guns in 1858.

== Life ==
He was born on 5 September 1789 in Bessières, Haute-Garonne. He entered the Ecole Polytechnique in 1807. He fought in Spain as an artillery lieutenant, in the campaigns of 1810, 1811, 1812, 1813 and 1814. He was in particular noticed at the siege of Cádiz. He became Brigadier general on 22 February 1829, at 39 years of age. One year after (1830), he commanded the artillery in Africa during the capture of Algiers.

He was President of the Artillery committee during the Revolution of 1848. He became Minister for Foreign Affairs from November 1849 until 9 January 1851.

He created the La Hitte system of rifled muzzle-loading guns in 1858:

"It would be unjust to omit on this occasion the name of General La Hitte, who at once took upon himself the responsibility of the new principles, and has continued with the utmost ability to carry them into execution. It is mainly to his firm adherence to these principles, and to the general uniformity of the system he established, that the success of the new arm is to be attributed"

— Lieutenant-colonel Treuille de Beaulieu, Report of the London International Exhibition, 1862.

He died on 22 September 1878 in Gragnague.

Political offices
Preceded by Alphonse de Rayneval	Minister of Foreign Affairs; 1849–1851	Succeeded by Édouard Drouyn de Lhuys
