= Dobrobat =

Ukrainian volunteer organization

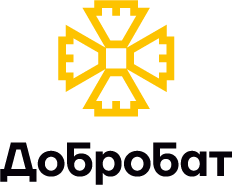
- Formation: 2022
- Purpose: Restoration of housing for Ukrainian citizens damaged by Russian aggression
- Head: Dmytro Ivanov
- Website: www.dobrobat.in.ua

Dobrobat (Ukrainian: Добробат) is a volunteer movement established in early April 2022 by public figure and former advisor to the Minister of Internal Affairs of Ukraine, Viktor Andrusiv, and former advisor to the Head of the Office of the President of Ukraine, Rostyslav Smirnov. Volodymyr Kreidenko, a member of the Ukrainian Parliament, serves as the movement's Ambassador.

The organization focuses on the rapid restoration of housing for Ukrainian citizens and social infrastructure damaged as a result of Russian aggression. It operates as a "construction battalion," coordinating thousands of volunteers across various regions of Ukraine to perform debris removal and emergency repairs.

"Dobrobat" actively collaborates with the Ministry of Internal Affairs of Ukraine and the State Emergency Service of Ukraine. All sites where volunteers operate undergo prior demining clearance to ensure safety. The movement's primary objective is to clear rubble and perform emergency repairs to make premises habitable, facilitating full-scale reconstruction in the long term.

The organization was the first volunteer association to assist the Irpin City Council in clearing debris from private and multi-story residential buildings following the hostilities in the Kyiv region in 2022.

On July 18, 2023, the "Dobrobat" team was strengthened with the appointment of Dmytro Ivanov as the new head of the organization.

In early March 2026, the movement's Ambassador, Member of the Parliament of Ukraine Volodymyr Kreidenko, established the International Parliamentary Coalition in support of "Dobrobat" volunteers.

== Activities ==
"Dobrobat" has established regional branches in the following regions: Kyiv, Chernihiv, Sumy, Lviv, Poltava, Kropyvnytskyi, Dnipro, Kharkiv, Zaporizhzhia, Odesa, Mykolaiv, Kherson, Ivano-Frankivsk, and Chernivtsi.

Volunteer construction battalions focus on:

- Debris removal from destroyed buildings;
- Dismantling of damaged structures;
- Emergency repairs, including roofing and the installation of windows and doors.

The organization plays a significant role in the national recovery effort alongside government authorities. With financial support from the Ministry for Communities, Territories and Infrastructure Development of Ukraine (formerly the Ministry of Infrastructure of Ukraine), "Dobrobat" implemented the restoration of the Ivanivka community in the Chernihiv region. Over the years of its operation, the founders have signed several memorandums of cooperation, including agreements with the Irpin City Council, the Hostomel Settlement Military Administration, and regional administrations in the Kharkiv and Kyiv regions.

"Dobrobat" is supported by a wide range of partners who provide construction materials, logistics, and meals for volunteers. The movement also collaborates with prominent Ukrainian figures, including actors, musicians, and influencers, who organize fundraising campaigns and provide information support.

Volodymyr Kreydenko, a Member of the Parliament of Ukraine and the project's Ambassador, is actively involved in securing international partnerships, fundraising, and grant programs. In cooperation with state executive authorities, these efforts are focused on the systematic restoration of homes destroyed during the conflict.

On October 13, 2022, founders Rostyslav Smirnov and Viktor Andrusiv, together with "Made in Ukraine" founder Yulia Savostina, launched the "Zihriy" (Warm Up) volunteer movement. The primary goal of this initiative is to provide Ukrainian defenders on the front lines with warm, hand-knitted clothing during the winter months.
