= Junqua =

Junqua may refer to:

- Junqua Ibis, 1990s light aircraft

== People with the name ==
- Arnaud Ernest Junqua (1816-1893), French military officer
- Sam Junqua (born 1996), American soccer player
