= Cent-gardes Squadron =

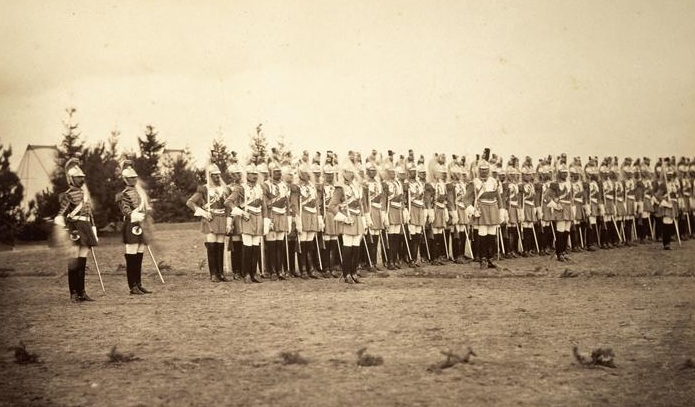
- Cent-garde squadron, c. 1870.
- Active: 24 March 1854 – 1 October 1870
- Country: France
- Branch: French Army
- Type: Cavalry
- Role: Lifeguard; Ceremonial Guard
- Size: Squadron
- Part of: Imperial Guard
- Garrison/HQ: Paris – Tuileries Palace
- Nickname: Cent-gardes

Commanders
- Ceremonial chief: Louis-Napoléon Bonaparte
- Notable commanders: Louis Lepic (1854); Albert Jacques Verly (1855); Jean Jules Bousson (1856); Armand Ernest Junqua (1857)

The Cent-gardes Squadron (French: L'Escadron des Cent-gardes), also called Cent Gardes à Cheval (Hundred Guardsmen on Horseback), was an elite cavalry squadron of the Second French Empire primarily responsible for protecting the person of the Emperor Napoleon III, as well as providing security within the Tuileries Palace. It also provided an escort for the emblems of the Imperial Guard and their award ceremony with flag and standard bearers.

The squadron was created by decree on 24 March 1854 by the Emperor. Comparisons were made between the new unit and the British Life Guards. When on duty the Cent-Gardes had to stand absolutely still and render honours only to the Emperor and members of the Imperial family. Although not formally part of the Imperial Guard, they were under the orders of the Grand Marshal of the Palace.

== Description ==
=== Headquarters and soldiers ===
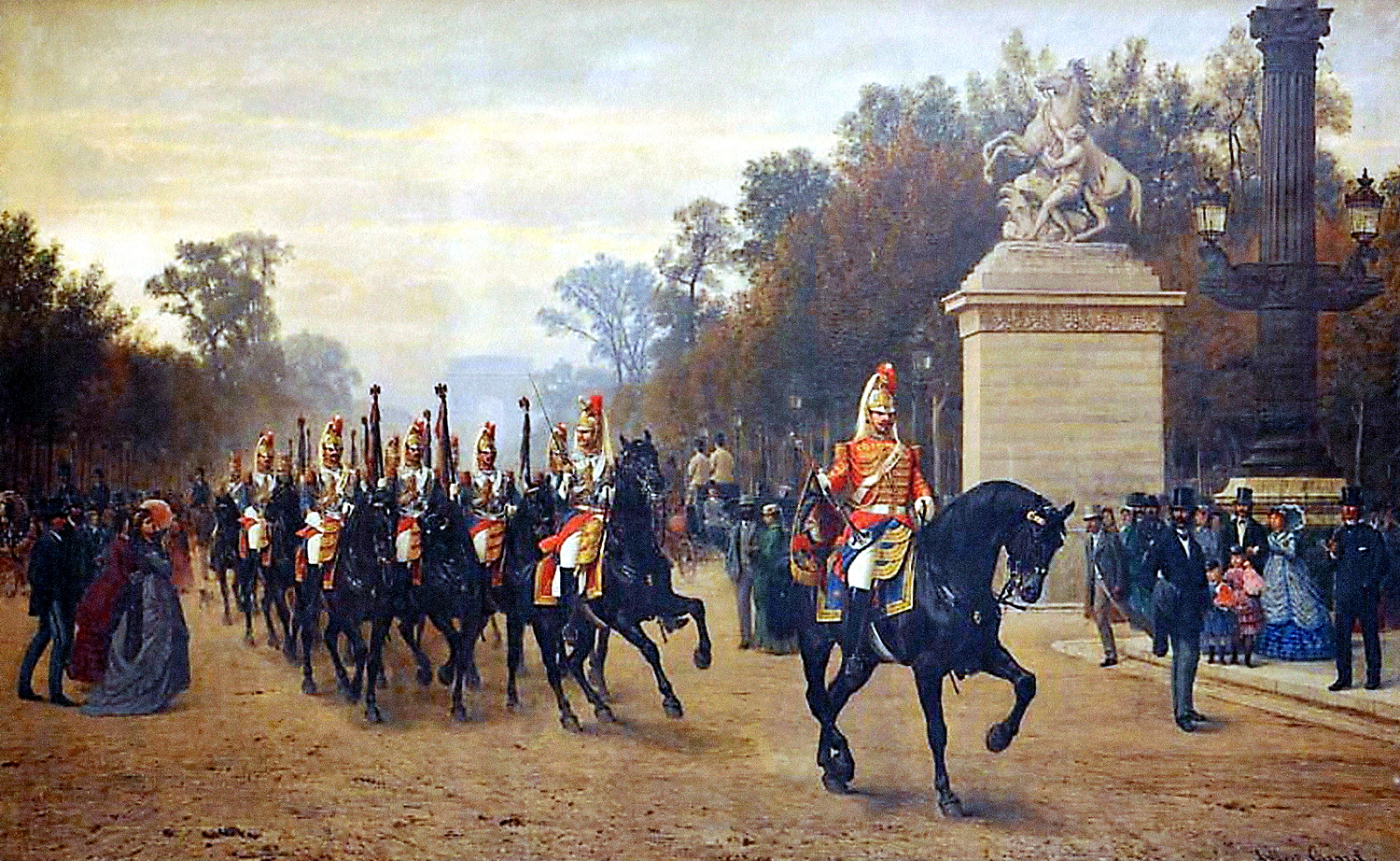
Cent-gardes parading in Paris

The Cent-Gardes squadron consisted of a headquarters, 11 officers and 137 privates, totalling 148 men at the time the unit was created, Later they would be increased to 190, including officers, and finally numbered 221 commissioned officers and guardsmen, including a lieutenant colonel, at the time that they were finally disbanded.

The soldiers of the squadron were recruited from the cavalry regiments of the Imperial Guard or from those of the line, and they had to be at least 1.80m tall. Their salary was 1,000 gold francs a year for guardsmen and trumpeters, an amount which was particularly high at the time. After completing seven years of service, their rate of pay increased by 80 additional cents per day.

The headquarters of the Cent-gardes were located in the Pentemont Abbey, a former convent which had also served as headquarters for the Imperial Guard. Their original barracks were in Sevres in the old farm of La Belle Polle. Napoleon III however had a farm built in the Swiss-style to lodge the Cent-gardes squadron and their horses in the new Pavillon des Cent-guardes in Marnes-la-Coquette, near the castle, in the area of Villeneuve-l'Étang.

Upon establishment the role of the Cent Gardes was defined as being to guard the Emperor and to provide services at the imperial palaces. In practice the latter function involved guarding the palace interior, including the door to the imperial bed chamber. In 1855 they were viewed by the visiting Queen Victoria, who described the unit as "very like our Life Guards, magnificent men of six foot and upward . . . and their dress very handsome".

=== Uniforms and weaponry ===
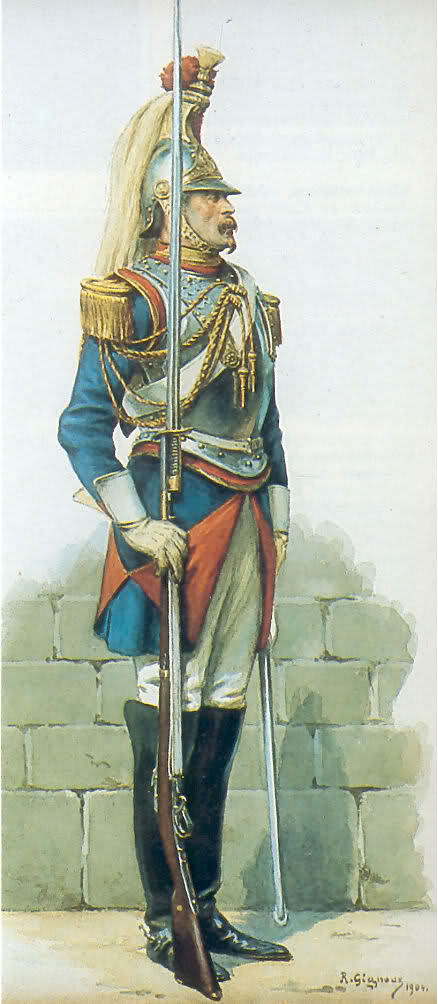
A Cent-Garde in full dress.

For off-duty wear (tenue de ville), their attire comprised a sky-blue tunic lined with red silk, red trousers with black stripes plus a cocked hat and sword. In full dress, the Cent-gardes wore white breeches with their light blue tunics plus a breastplate embossed with the French Imperial Eagle and a helmet with a white plume. On Palace guard duty, the Cent-gardes were issued with a surcoat of fine chamois cloth, decorated with gold braid on the chest' and embroidered with the Imperial coat of arms.

Their weapons consisted of a snap-clasped Treuille-de-Beaulieu breech-loading falling-block pinfire carbine, 9 mm caliber, unusual in that it fired from an open bolt. The straight cavalry sword issued to Cent-Gardes could be fixed to this carbine as a sword-bayonet, forming together a monstrous, more than 2 meters long fusil-lance (pictured here). A more usual smallsword was worn with walking out dress.

=== Campaigns ===
In 1854 the Lieutenant colonel Jacques Félix Auguste Lepic was the commanding officer succeeded in 1855 by Colonel Baron Albert Jacques Verly. The latter remained in command of the squadron until 1870, with Captain Arnaud Ernest Junqua as his second-in-command from 1857. The Cent-gardes escorted the Emperor during the Second Italian War of Independence at Magenta and Solferino where Verly, serving in the field as commander, was wounded in his arm.

During the Franco-Prussian War of 1870 part of the squadron accompanied the Emperor to Metz, and during the Battle of Sedan they were constantly at his side. The squadron was disbanded by a decree of 1 October 1870 and the serving Cent-gardes were transferred to the Second Regiment of Cuirassiers, which served dismounted in the defense of Paris following the dissolution of the Second Empire. The black horses of the Cent-gardes were amongst the animals butchered to feed the starving population during the Siege of Paris.

== See also ==
- Grenadiers à Cheval de la Garde Impériale

== Bibliography ==
- Albert Verly, L'escadron des cent-gardes, Ollendorff, Paris (1895). Illustrations in colour and in black and white by Félix Régamey.
