= Volodymyr Kreidenko =

Ukrainian politician

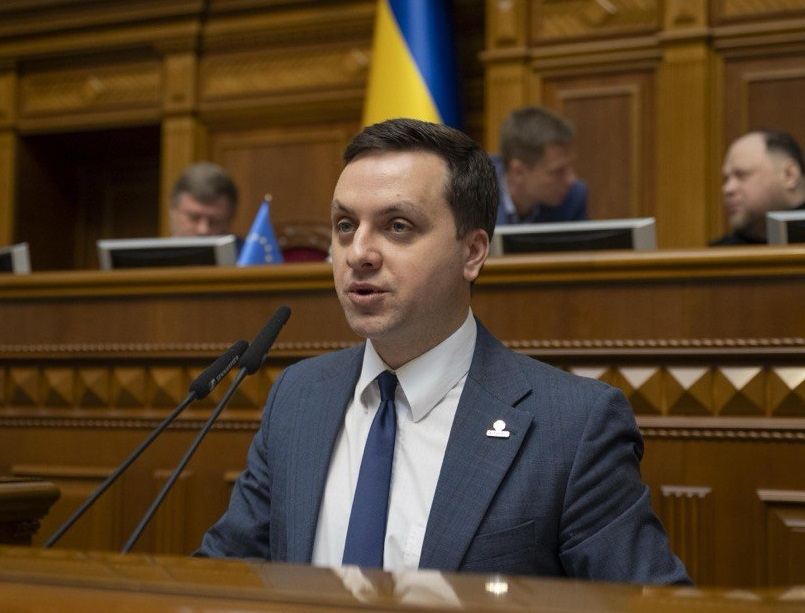
- Born: 8 May 1987 (age 39); Melitopol, Zaporizhzhia Oblast, Ukrainian SSR
- Education: Kyiv International University, National Academy for Public Administration under the President of Ukraine
- Occupations: Politician, Member of the Verkhovna Rada of Ukraine

Volodymyr Viktorovych Kreidenko (Ukrainian: Володимир Вікторович Крейденко born 8 May 1987, Melitopol, Zaporizhzhia Oblast, Ukrainian Soviet Socialist Republic) is a Ukrainian politician serving as a People's Deputy of Ukraine in the 9th convocation since 2019, representing the Servant of the People party. He is the Deputy Chairman of the Verkhovna Rada Committee on Transport and Infrastructure.

He holds a Candidate of Sciences degree (the equivalent of a PhD) and served as an Associate Professor at the Department of Parliamentarism and Political Management of the National Academy for Public Administration under the President of Ukraine.

Since 2022, he has been an Ambassador of the Dobrobat Volunteer Construction Battalion. Since March 2026, he has been the founder of the International Parliamentary Coalition in Support of Dobrobat Volunteers.

== Education ==
- 2004–2009 : Kyiv International University, Master of Political Science
- 2010–2012 : Сompleted postgraduate studies at the Department of Political Analytics and Forecasting of the National Academy for Public Administration under the President of Ukraine.
- 2024: Completed a military training program for reserve officers at the Bohdan Khmelnytskyi National Academy of the State Border Guard Service of Ukraine, Junior Lieutenant.
