= Alphonse de Rayneval =

French politician

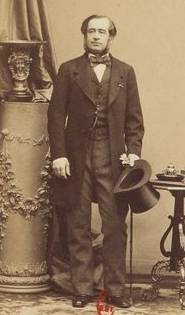
Portrait of Count Alphonse de Rayneval

Alphonsus comte de Rayneval (1 August 1813 – 10 February 1858) was a French politician, diplomat and aristocrat who was briefly Minister of Foreign Affairs in 1849, French Ambassador to the Holy See from 1850 to 1857, and French Ambassador to Russia from 1857 to 1858.

== Biography ==
He was born in Paris, the son of Francis, comte de Rayneval, Undersecretary of State for Foreign Affairs of the Restoration. His sister was Clemence de Rayneval, a model for Jean-Auguste-Dominique Ingres.

He was undersecretary to the French Ambassador to Rome and ministre plénipotentiaire in Naples (1848-1849).
He was Minister of Foreign Affairs from 31 October 1849 to 17 November 1849, in the Government of Alphonse Henri, comte d'Hautpoul. After that, he was Ambassador of France to the Holy See (1850-1857) and to Russia (1857-1858).

He died in Paris and is buried at Père Lachaise Cemetery.

Political offices
Preceded by Alexis de Tocqueville	Minister of Foreign Affairs; 31 October 1849 - 17 November 1849	Succeeded by Jean-Ernest Ducos, vicomte de La Hitte
