= Lancers of the Imperial Guard =

Second empire

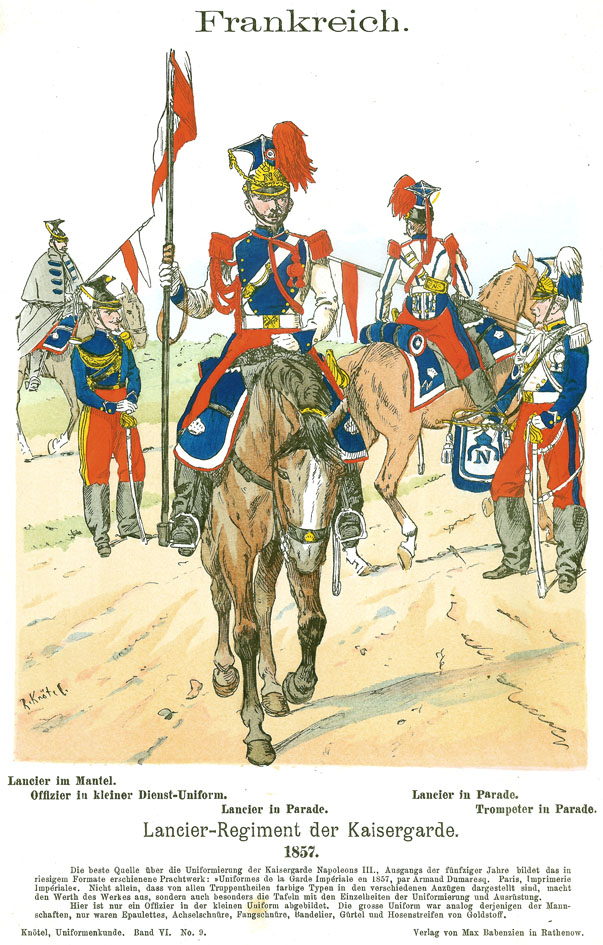
- Lancers of the Imperial Guard, 1857. Richard Knötel, Uniformenkunde, 1890, volume VI, plate 9.
- Active: December 20th, 1855 - October 28th, 1870
- Country: France
- Allegiance: Second French Empire
- Branch: Cavalry
- Type: Regiment
- Engagements: Second Italian War of Independence: Battle of Solferino; Franco-Prussian War: Battle of Mars-la-Tour; Siege of Metz

The regiment Lancers of the Imperial Guard was a French cavalry unit of the Second Empire, forming part of the Imperial Guard. Set up in 1855, it was disbanded with the rest of the Guard by decree on October 28, 1870.

Organized in Melun, the regiment underwent various upheavals before being definitively reduced to six squadrons in 1867. During the fifteen years of its existence, the lancers provided an escort for Napoleon III during the Orsini assassination attempt in Paris; in the field, they also followed the Emperor, but rarely took part in combat. During the Franco-Prussian War of 1870, the corps under Colonel Latheulade took part in the battle of Mars-la-Tour, shortly before the final French defeat that led to its demise.

The uniform is characterized by the Polish czapka and spear. The rest of the uniform features a white suit with a blue bib and scarlet passementarie, which led military painter Lucien Rousselot to describe it as "one of the most brilliant of the Second Empire".

== History ==
=== Organization ===
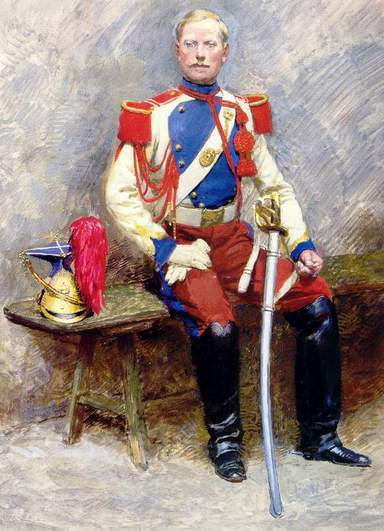
Imperial Guard lancer in full regalia, by Édouard Detaille.

In 1854, two years after the Second Empire came to power, Napoleon III re-established the Garde Impériale, an elite military corps attached to his person. The Guard took up the traditions of the first Imperial Guard, formed in 1804 by Napoleon I and disbanded in 1815. The Guard's cavalry, originally made up of two regiments - cuirassiers and guides - was gradually expanded to include new units. On December 20, 1855, an imperial decree created four additional cavalry regiments, including the Imperial Guard Lancers.

The brand-new regiment was quartered at Melun, where it would join the six squadrons provided for in the edict. The dissolution of the 2nd cuirassiers de la Garde regiment in 1865 increased the number of squadrons to eight, which was reduced to five on November 15 of the same year for reasons of economy. The corps finally returned to six squadrons in early February 1867. In the meantime, the Lancers had already seen two colonels: Valentin Auguste Lichtlin, future major general, and, from 1860, Jacques Louis Eugène Begougne de Juniac, who later became brigadier general. Charles Alphonse Aimé Yvelin de Béville, a veteran of the 6th cuirassiers, held his post until 1869, when he was replaced by Henri Jean Baptiste de Latheulade, who commanded the regiment during its last campaign.

In 1862, the Guard's lancers left their barracks in Melun for those in Fontainebleau, where they spent five years until 1867. At this point, they moved to Paris to provide security for foreign monarchs visiting the Exposition Universelle (1867), before returning to Melun at the end of 1869. The corps was dissolved on October 28, 1870, with the rest of the Imperial Guard and its elements incorporated into the marching regiments of the French cavalry. The last squadron merged on April 13, 1871 in Lyon with the 9th regiment of chevau-légers lancers.

=== "Baptism of fire" for the Orsini attack ===
On January 14, 1858, Napoleon III and his court attended a gala evening at the Opéra Le Peletier. The moment was chosen by Italian conspirator Felice Orsini to make an attempt on the sovereign's life. One of his accomplices threw a bomb under the horses of the escort, which that day consisted of a squadron of Imperial Guard lancers commanded by Lieutenant Noguet. The explosion spared the Emperor, but the lancers in his wake paid a heavy price: 12 of them were wounded - 7 of them seriously - as were some 20 horses. A maréchal des logis positioned at the left door of the imperial carriage received three wounds; "not one of the men of the escort whose effects bear no trace of the explosion". Fleury and Sonolet, in Historia n° 134, report the following anecdote:

"A moment later, one of the doctors on duty came to warn the Emperor that a lancer from the escort, mortally wounded and deposited in a nearby pharmacy, had just entered agony. He rose to his feet, but was stopped at the corridor door by the peace officer Hébert. "Sir," the latter respectfully objected, "the perpetrators of the attack have not yet been arrested. Your Majesty would be acting prudently if he didn't leave his dressing room. Whatever!" replied the Emperor, in a tone that brooked no reply, "I want to see this lancer. Accompanied by a few of his retinue, he went downstairs to the pharmacy. The unfortunate soldier he had come to see was lying on a mattress and had just regained supreme consciousness. Without a word, Napoleon III took the small diamond cross he wore on the lapel of his black suit and attached it to the dying man's uniform".

=== Battles and campaigns ===
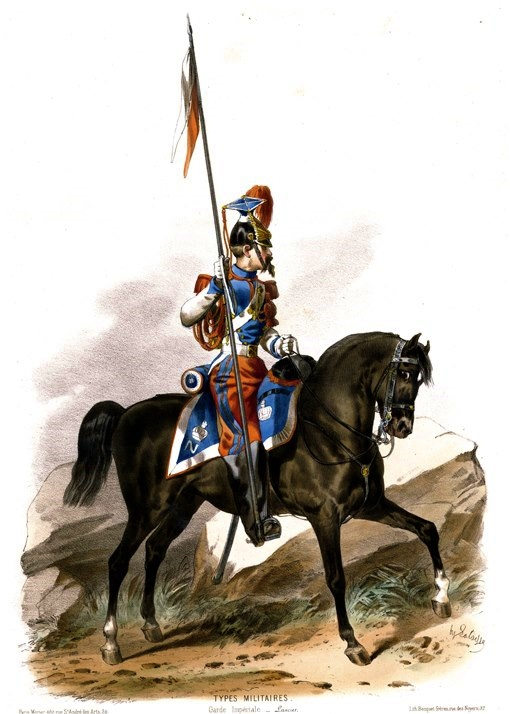
Imperial Guard lancers, by François Hippolyte Lalaisse.

The Italian campaign began in April 1859, when France joined forces with the Kingdom of Piedmont-Sardinia against the Austrian Empire. The Guard lancers left Compiègne on May 7 with 45 officers and 684 men, arriving in Genoa on the 28th to join the Guard cavalry division commanded by General Louis-Michel Morris. Together with the Empress's dragoons, they formed the 2nd brigade. The regiment's role was however modest. It was present at the Battle of Solferino on June 24, 1859, but was not involved, and had to content itself with acting as liaison between the 2nd and 4th French corps. The maneuver, however, came under fire from Austrian artillery, which wounded two lancers. The regiment was awarded two Legion of Honor crosses and two military medals at the end of the campaign.

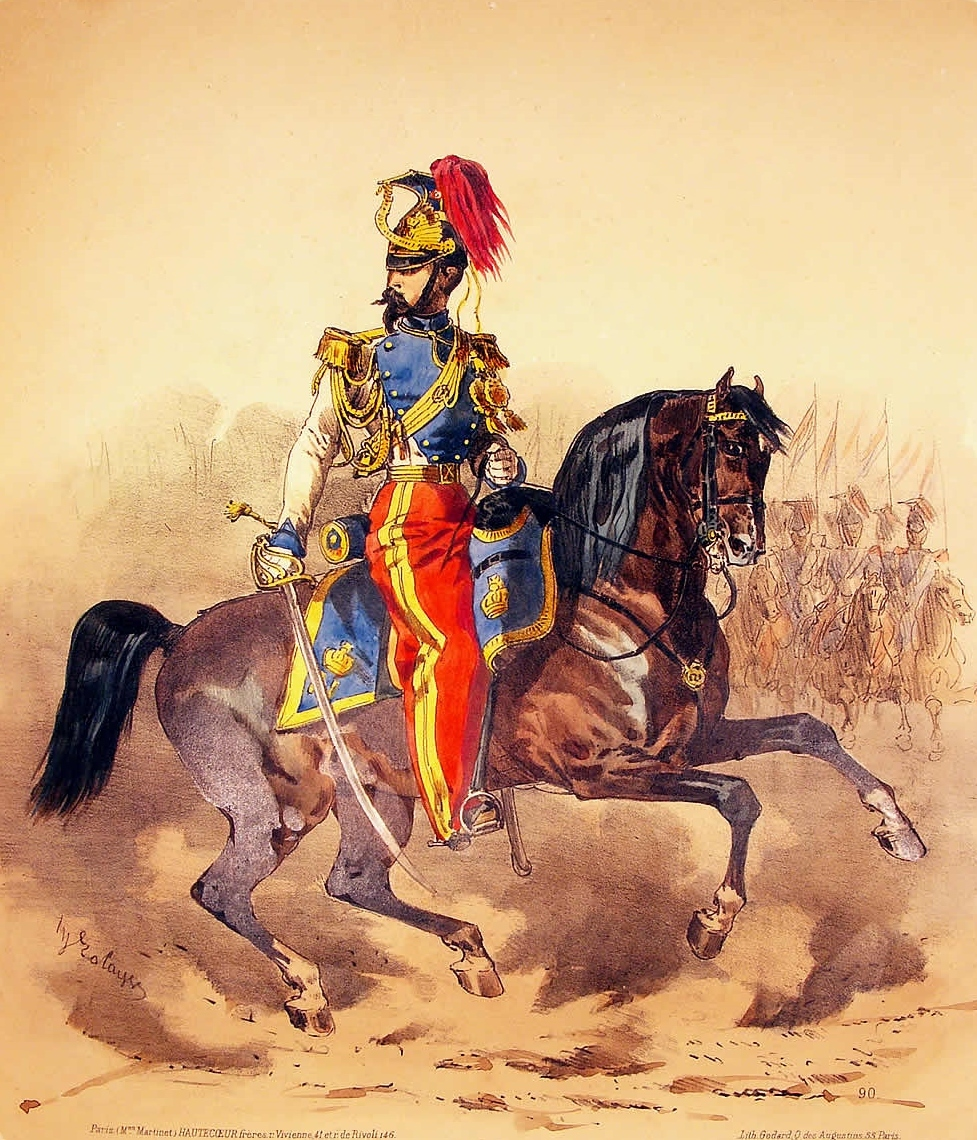
Officer of the Imperial Guard Lancers in full regalia, by François Hippolyte Lalaisse.

Eleven years later, the Lancers of the Guard played a more active role in the Franco-Prussian War of 1870, once again joining up with the Empress's dragoons. A few days after the outbreak of hostilities, the regiment was transported by train to Nancy. The first part of the campaign was a series of marches and counter-marches for the Guard cavalry, with Metz, Boucheporn, Longeville-lès-Saint-Avold, Maizery and Borny being the successive stages. French defeats at Forbach-Spicheren and Frœschwiller led to the formation of a Guards cavalry marching regiment, to which the 4th squadron of lancers was assigned. On August 14, a heavy fighting broke out around Metz, but the Guard lancers were unable to intervene and had to follow the retreat to Verdun. On the 16th, after escorting the Emperor beyond Conflans, the regiment took up position in a wooded area near the village of Rezonville, amid the tumult of the battle that had just begun.

The afternoon passed without any major events, but a reconnaissance by General du Barail 's chasseurs d'Afrique confirmed the presence of large masses of Prussian cavalry. In the evening, at around 6 o'clock, this cavalry set off to turn the French right wing. It was made up of Hanoverian uhlans, Westphalian cuirassiers and the 2nd regiment of Prussian Guard dragoons. Informed of this, General Defrance, commander of the 2nd Guards cavalry brigade, ordered the lancers to charge. Colonel de Latheulade roused his squadrons, who lined up in battle on the Ville-sur-Yron plateau. Faced with approaching Prussian horsemen shouting "Hurrah!", their French counterparts crossed their lances. The "extremely violent" clash disables the German front rank, before the melee becomes confused: "saber and lance blows, gunfire, horses and riders falling on top of each other, cries of rage and despair...". In the confusion, the 3rd dragoon regiment took on the Guard lancers, whom they had mistaken for uhlans. After an intense fight, the confrontation finally turned to the disadvantage of the lancers, who were forced to withdraw to their home base, where Latheulade rallied them.

By the end of the battle, the regiment had suffered severe losses: 17 officers and 170 cavalrymen were killed, wounded or missing. Many of them rejoined their units in the following days, bringing the total loss to 27 killed, 75 wounded and 48 missing. The 2nd squadron, down to 35 men, was the hardest hit. Colonel de Latheulade, who was hit several times, narrowly escaped capture. The following day, following the order to withdraw to Metz, the Guard lancers arrived on August 19 at Ban-Saint-Martin, from where they did not leave until the 25th, entering Metz the same day. The regiment set up camp on the island of Chambière, then at Fort de Saint-Julien from August 31. Meanwhile, the Prussians laid siege to the city, and the Guard cavalry witnessed a few skirmishes near Servigny-lès-Sainte-Barbe. "From that day on, the regiment took no part in any sorties that were attempted. Food supplies are becoming increasingly scarce. The number of horses diminishes daily. Some of them die on the rope for lack of food, while others are slaughtered to feed the troops.In fact, all the cavalry was soon dismantled, and Latheulade's lancers had to swap the lance for the Chassepot rifle. On October 27, 1870, the capitulation of Metz was signed, leaving the entire garrison in the hands of the Prussian army. The régiment des lanciers de la Garde was taken captive and sent to Silesia. Only the 4th squadron remained to take part in the siege of Paris, as part of the régiment de marche de la cavalerie de la Garde, which later became the 20th regiment of dragoons.

== Uniforms ==
"The regiment's uniform was among the most brilliant of the Second Empire". - Lucien Rousselot, Garde impériale: Lanciers 1855-1870, plate n°^{.} 18 in the series "L'Armée française", 1965

=== Troupe ===
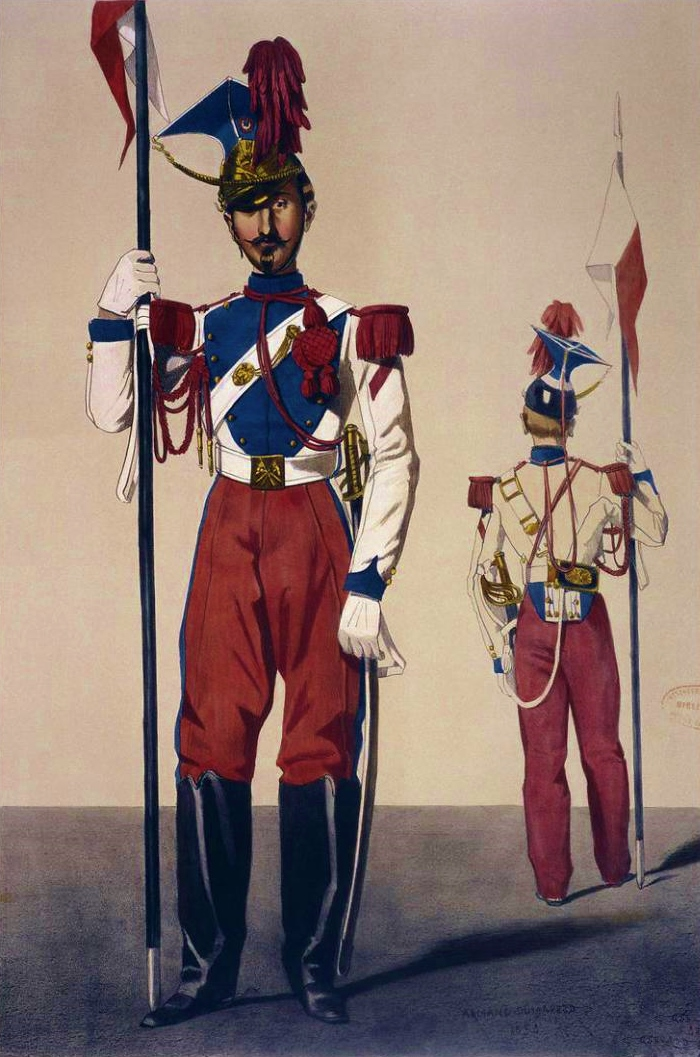
Imperial Guard lancers in full regalia, 1857, by Charles Édouard Armand-Dumaresq.

The headdress is the czapka of Polish origin, typical of lancer regiments. For the troops, it is covered with a sky-blue cloth and topped with a scarlet plume made of rooster feathers. The front is embellished with a copper plate featuring the imperial "N" on a sunburst background. The white canvas suit is complemented by a sky-blue breastplate. The pointed facings, collar and turn-up are the same color as the breastplate. The overall effect is enhanced by scarlet aiguillettes and epaulets, the latter being the general pattern assigned to the Guard. The rest of the uniform consists of rose madder pants with false boots, decorated on the side with piping and two sky-blue stripes. When on the road, the lancers wore a blue uniform instead of white, which led to a misunderstanding on the part of the French dragoons at the battle of Mars-la-Tour, who mistook the Guard lancers for Prussian. The chapska is worn without a plume but with a tricolor cockade, while the breastplate is turned up on the white side, revealing sky-blue piping around the edges. Stable dress consisted of a blue side cap with white markings, a blue jacket with a central row of buttons and white "trellis" pants.

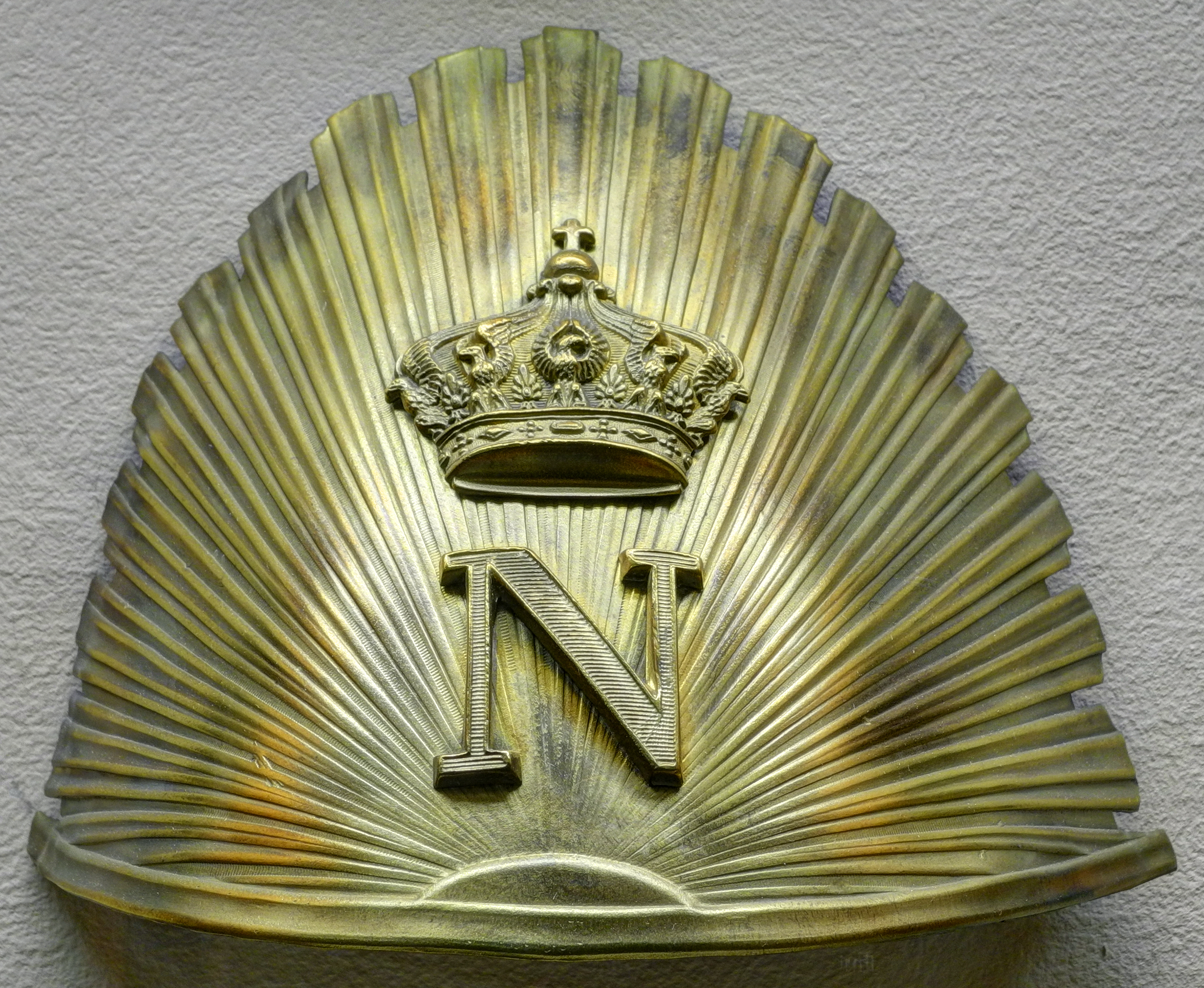
Czapka plaque for the Imperial Guard lancers.

=== Trumpets ===
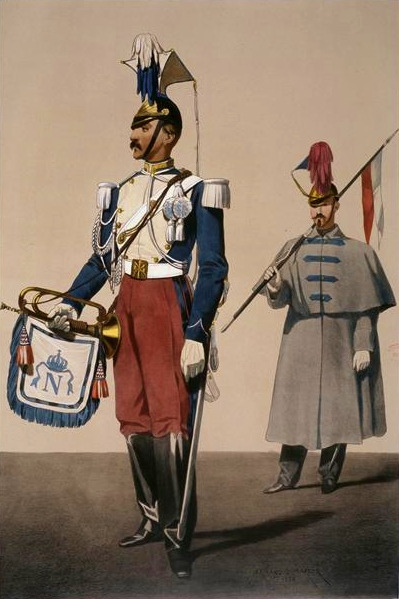
Trumpeter in full regalia and soldier in Imperial Guard lancers' coat, 1857, by Charles Édouard Armand-Dumaresq.

The trumpets are dressed in reversed colors, with a blue habit and white breastplate. The czapka is made of white cloth, and the scarlet plume is replaced by a white plume on the upper part and a sky-blue plume on the lower part. The epaulets and aiguillettes are in white wool, as is the passementerie. The trumpet's flame is decorated with a white background on which a sky-blue crowned "N" is embroidered in the center, with braids and fringes of the same color. The trumpet corps rides gray horses.

=== Officers ===
The officers' uniform is distinguished from the troops' by a distinctive trimming. While the czapka is identical, the uniform is characterized by distinctive gold epaulets, aiguillettes, coulants, snowshoes and tassels. In addition, white piping adorns the collar, and the blue piping on the pants is framed by two gold bands. On the back, two blue pipings rise from the basques to the sleeve facings. The undress uniform includes a chapska cover slipped over the headdress, to which a golden woollen pompom is attached. The uniform consists of a blue jacket with a single row of buttons, aiguillette and gold-fringed epaulette, the first on the right side, the second on the left.

== Weaponry and equipment ==
The troop's cartridge box is made of black leather edged with yellow copper, with the Empire coat of arms on a radiant background at its center. It is held across the body by white buffleterie straps with metal fasteners. The belt, also white, is fastened with a gold metal buckle featuring bundled spears. For officers, the metal edge of the gibern is decorated with plant motifs, and the buffleterieis alternating blue and gold. The same applies to the belt and buckle, the latter stamped with a radiating eagle. As for the troop's harness, the leather saddle sits on a sky-blue cloth shabrack with white braid and blue piping. The upper part is adorned on each side with a white imperial crown; on the lower part, an "N" crowned in white thread. In front of the rider, the shabrack is partially lined with a black fur skin with white serrations. The coat rack, behind the cantle, is blue with white braids, a crown embroidered on each side. For officers, the white braids are distinctive gold.

The regiment's standard armament, also used by brigadiers and maréchaux des logis, includes a model 1822 T pistol - replaced in 1860 by the 1822 T bis - a model 1822 line cavalry sabre and a spear, which can be either a model 1816 or 1823. The latter is surmounted by a white and scarlet flame made of woollen fabric, quickly replaced by the silk given when the regiment was created. The model 1822 light cavalry sabre was very popular with officers, but less so with the troops, even though it was authorized on a non-regulation basis. Louis Delpérier notes "that the weapon legally attributed to the Line Lancers is the light cavalry saber and not the line cavalry saber, a difference for which we have no explanation". Trumpeters, musicians, conductors, adjutants and chief maréchaux des logis are armed in the same way, minus the lance.

== Bibliography ==
- Baronne, Nonce (2003). "Le régiment des Lanciers de la Garde Impériale". Gazette des Uniformes (210): 29–32.
- Rousselot, Lucien (1965). Garde impériale : Lanciers 1855-1870. Paris: P. Spadem.
- Delpérier, Louis (1987). "Les armes de la cavalerie de la Garde 1854-1870". Tradition Magazine, Histoire et Collections (5): 23–28.
- Delpérier, Louis; Malvaux, Bertrand; Jouineau, André (2002). La Garde Impériale de Napoléon III. Éditions du Canonnier. p. 399. ISBN 978-2-912430-06-9.

== See also ==
- Imperial Guard Artillery (1st empire)
- Horse Artillery of the Imperial Guard
