= Jean Jules Bousson =

French officer (1834–1926)

Jean Jules Bousson (13 March 1834 in Vincennes – 3 September 1926 in Paris) was a French officer of the Cent-gardes Squadron.

== Life ==
Captain Bousson was a student of the school of Saint Cyr. He was appointed Lieutenant of the 2nd Carabiniers-à-Cheval on 1 October 1854, joining the Emperor's Cent-gardes Squadron on 20 June 1856. Appointed Lieutenant on 14 March 1859, he took part in the Second Italian War of Independence. He later became Captain on 8 December 1861, and then Captain Adjutant-Major, and finally Commander of the squadron in 1865.

On 10 August 1868 he was named Cavalry Major for the 4th light cavalry regiment. During the war of 1870, he was named Chevalier of the Légion d'Honneur after the battle of Spicheren. Named first Lieutenant Colonel to the 3rd regiment of cuirassiers on 1 November 1879, he was named Colonel on 13 July 1884, commanding the 8th Dragons Regiment and the 7th regiment of cuirassiers. Appointed General of Brigade on 28 October 1891, he commanded the 13th army corps cavalry brigade and was then finally appointed Commander of the Legion of honour on 30 December 1895.
