= La Hitte system =

Rifled field gun system, 1858

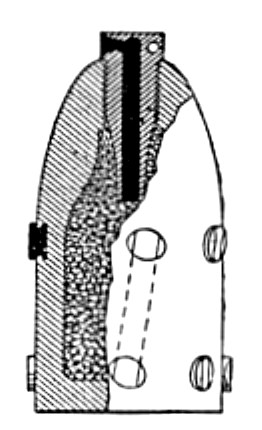
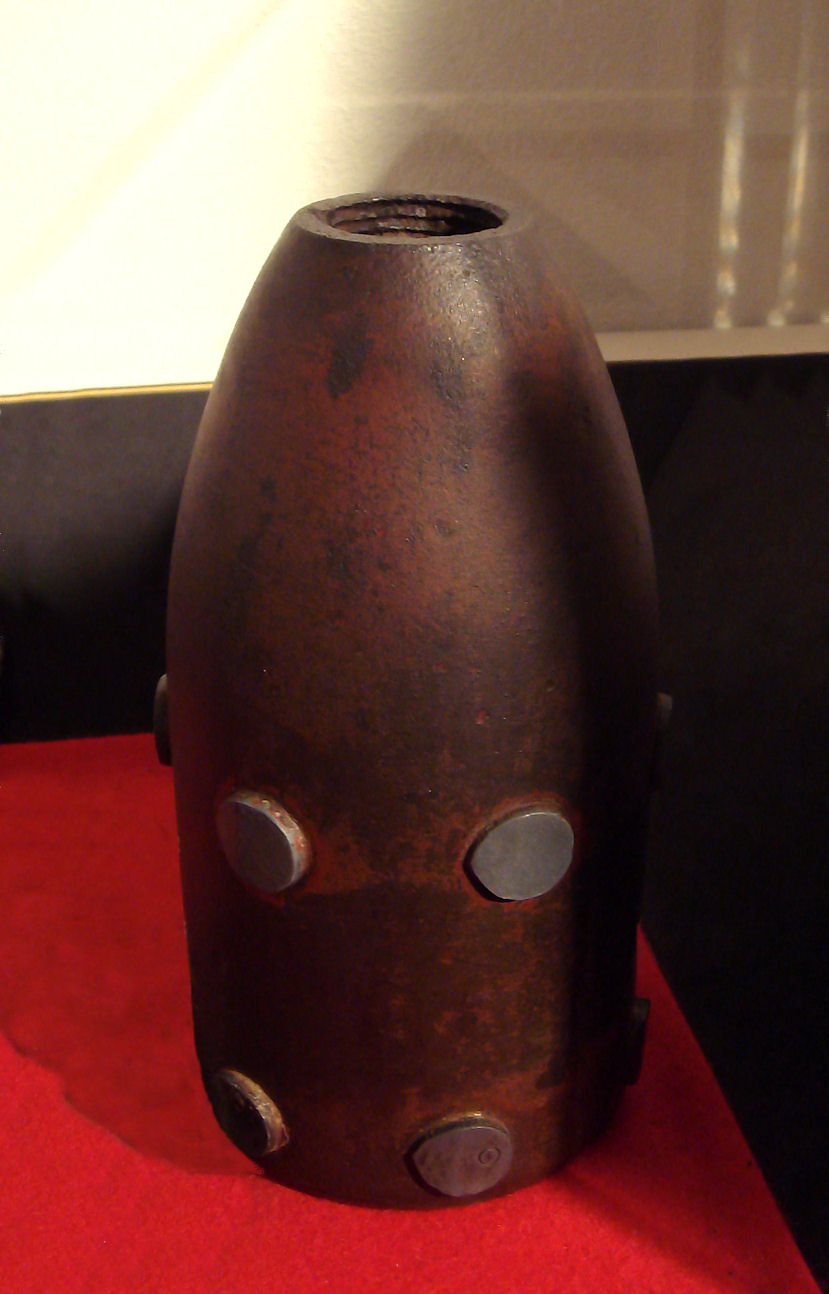
Left image: The La Hitte system was based on a shell equipped with lugs which allowed it to follow the rifle grooves inside the cannon bore.
Right image: Shell used in Japan during the Boshin war.

The La Hitte system (French: système La Hitte), named after the French general Ducos, Count de La Hitte, was an artillery system designed in March 1858 to implement rifled muzzle-loading guns in the French Army.

== Conception ==
The La Hitte system was developed through the collaborative work of Lieutenant-colonel Treuille de Beaulieu ("Directeur de l'atelier de précision") who had developed the principle and General de La Hitte ("Président du Comité d'Artillerie") who had implemented it:

It would be unjust to omit on this occasion the name of General La Hitte, who at once took upon himself the responsibility of the new principles, and has continued with the utmost ability to carry them into execution. It is mainly to his firm adherence to these principles, and to the general uniformity of the system he established, that the success of the new arm is to be attributed

— Lieutenant-colonel Treuille de Beaulieu, Report of the London International Exhibition, 1862.

== Specifications ==
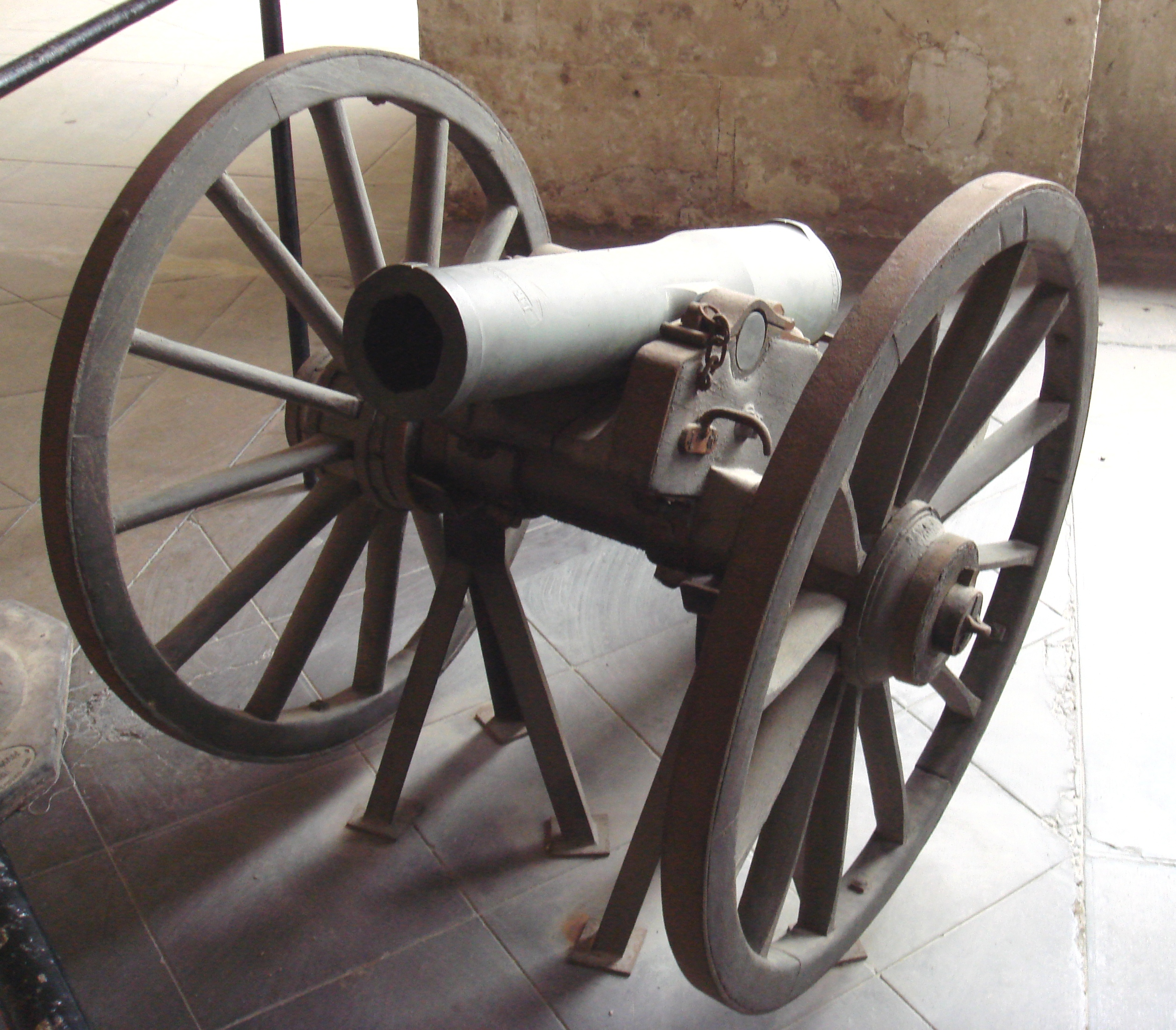
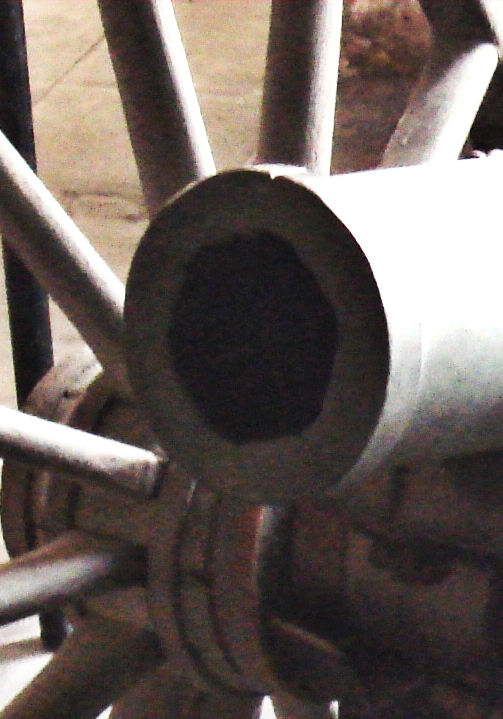
Left image: Rifled mountain cannon "Canon de montagne de 4 modèle 1859 Le Pétulant". Caliber: 86 mm (3.4 in). Length: 0.82 m (2 ft 8 in). Weight: 101 kg (223 lb) (208 kg (459 lb) with carriage). Ammunition: 4 kg (8.8 lb) shell.
Right image: Hexagonal rifling of Le Pétulant (detail).

The new rifled guns were used from 1859 during the Franco-Austrian War in Italy. These guns were a considerable improvement over the previous smooth-bore guns which had been in use. They were able to shoot at 3,000 m (9,800 ft) either regular shells, ball-loaded shells or grapeshot. They appear to have been the first examples of rifled cannons used on a battlefield.

The system was muzzle-loading, and the shells could be detonated either on impact, or at one of two set distances with a time fuse. To counter the lack of flexibility given by only 2 different distances, ricochet shots were employed, each bounce slowing the shell down. A six set distances fuse was initially invented but didn't give satisfaction. For ball-loaded payloads, a four set distances fuse was used. The shells, based on the 1847 invention of Captain Tamisier, were oval-shaped, and had small protrusions to follow the grooves of the bore. Previous guns, such as the Canon obusier de 12, were rifled to accommodate the system. The system included newly-rifled siege guns of 12 cm (4.7 in), 16 cm (6.3 in) and 24 cm (9.4 in) bore, new field guns of 8.6 cm (3.4 in) and 12 cm (4.7 in) bore, new siege guns of 12 cm (4.7 in) and 24 cm (9.4 in) bore, and a mountain gun of 8.6 cm (3.4 in) bore.

== Change in meaning of gun designations ==
With the introduction of rifling and elongated shells replacing the old roundshot, guns could fire projectiles of nearly twice the previous weight possible for a given bore (calibre). The rifling gave a far greater range for a given propellant charge, hence a minimal increase in gunpowder was needed for the heavier shells. While the La Hitte guns retained the traditional 4 designation, the number now approximated to kg rather than the livre (French pound) as previously. Hence the Canon de campagne de 4 La Hitte fired a shell weighing nearly 4 kg (8.8 lb).

== Obsolescence ==
The La Hitte system was superseded in 1870 with the work of Jean-Baptiste Verchère de Reffye and the development of breech-loading rifled guns.

== Gallery ==
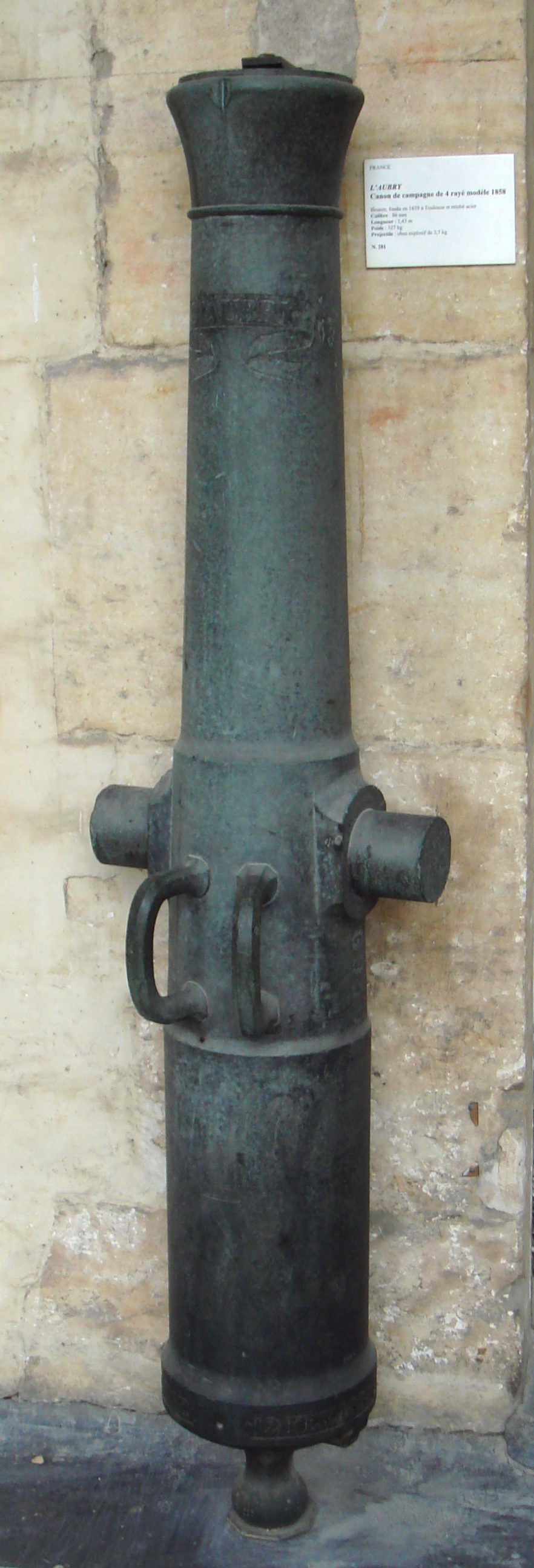
Rifled muzzle-loading gun "Canon de campagne de 4 rayé modèle 1858, L' Aubry". Caliber: 86 mm (3.4 in). Length: 1.43 m (4 ft 8 in). Weight: 327 kg (721 lb). Ammunition: 37 kg (82 lb) shell. Bronze, cast in Toulouse in 1859, re-tubed with steel.

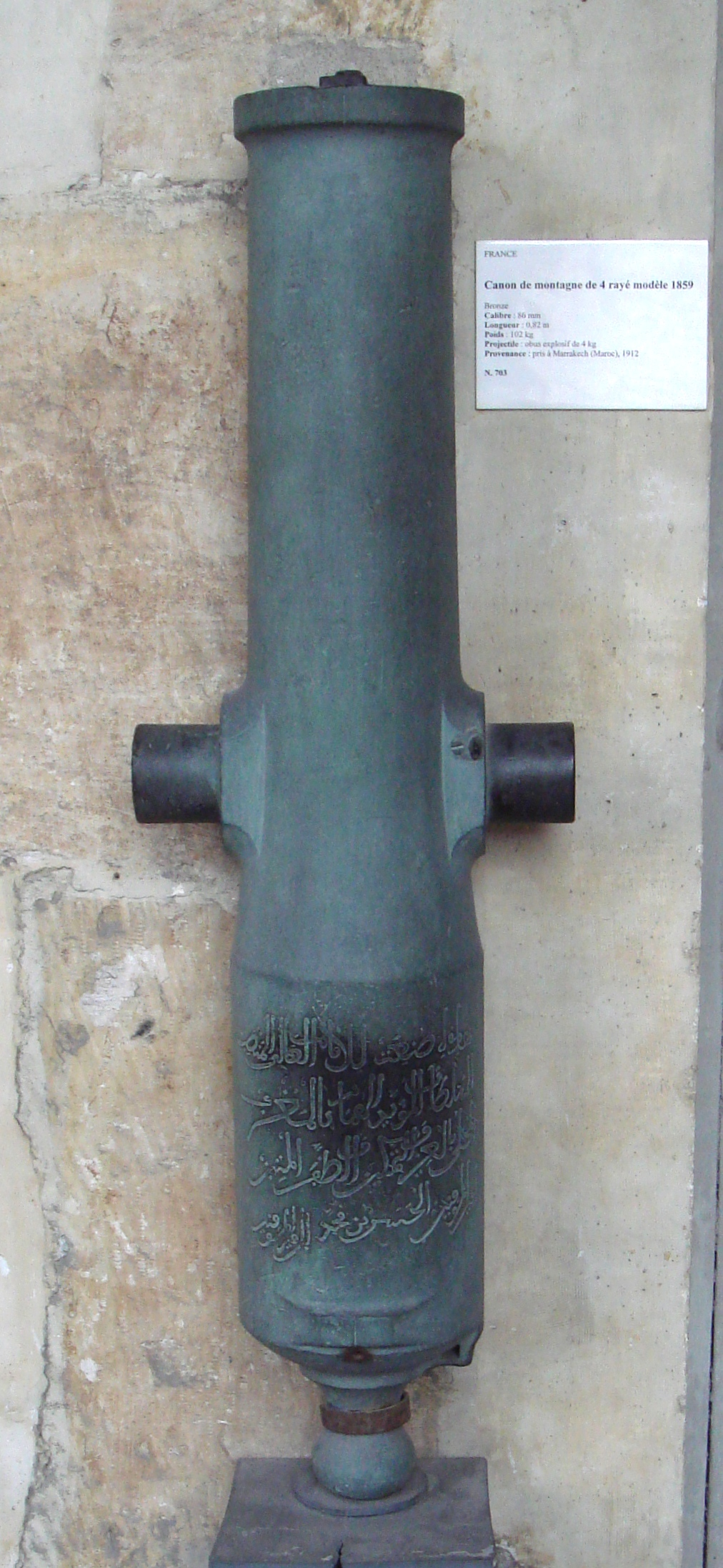
Rifled mountain cannon "Canon de montagne de 4 rayé modèle 1859". Caliber: 86 mm (3.4 in). Length: 0.82 m (2 ft 8 in). Weight: 102 kg (225 lb). Ammunition: 4 kg (8.8 lb) shell. Captured in Marrakesh (Morocco) in 1912.

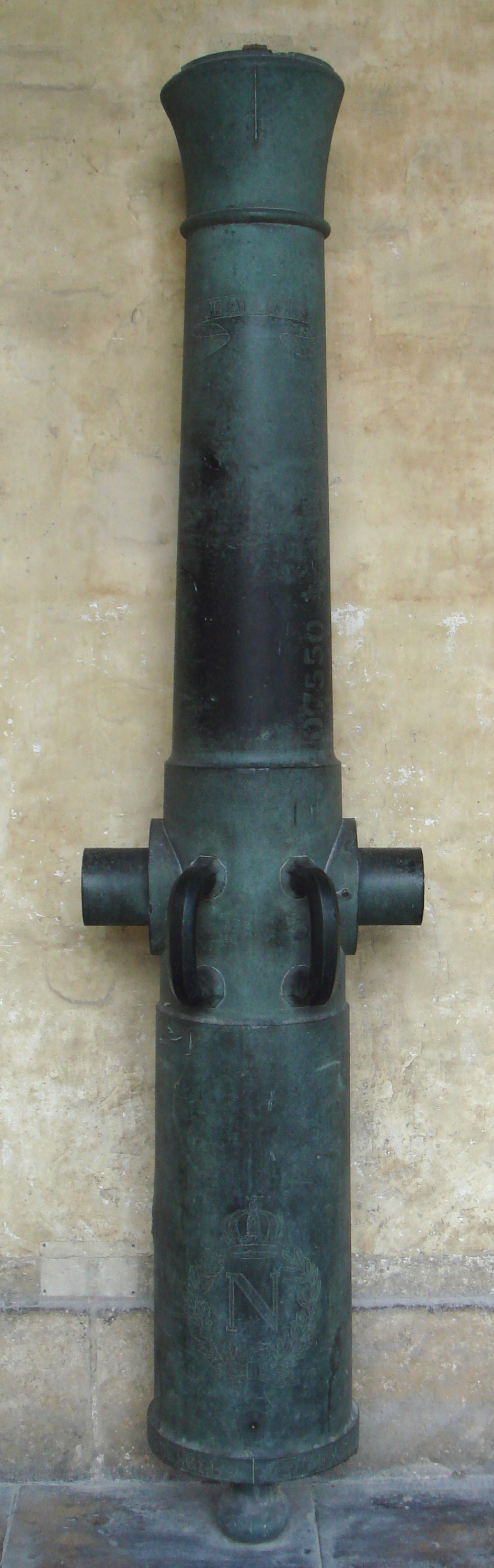
Canon de 12 La Hitte, Modele 1859, cast in 1869 at Bourges, bronze. Caliber: 121 mm (4.8 in), rifled. Length: 229 cm (90 in). Weight: 878 kg (1,936 lb). Ammunition: shells.

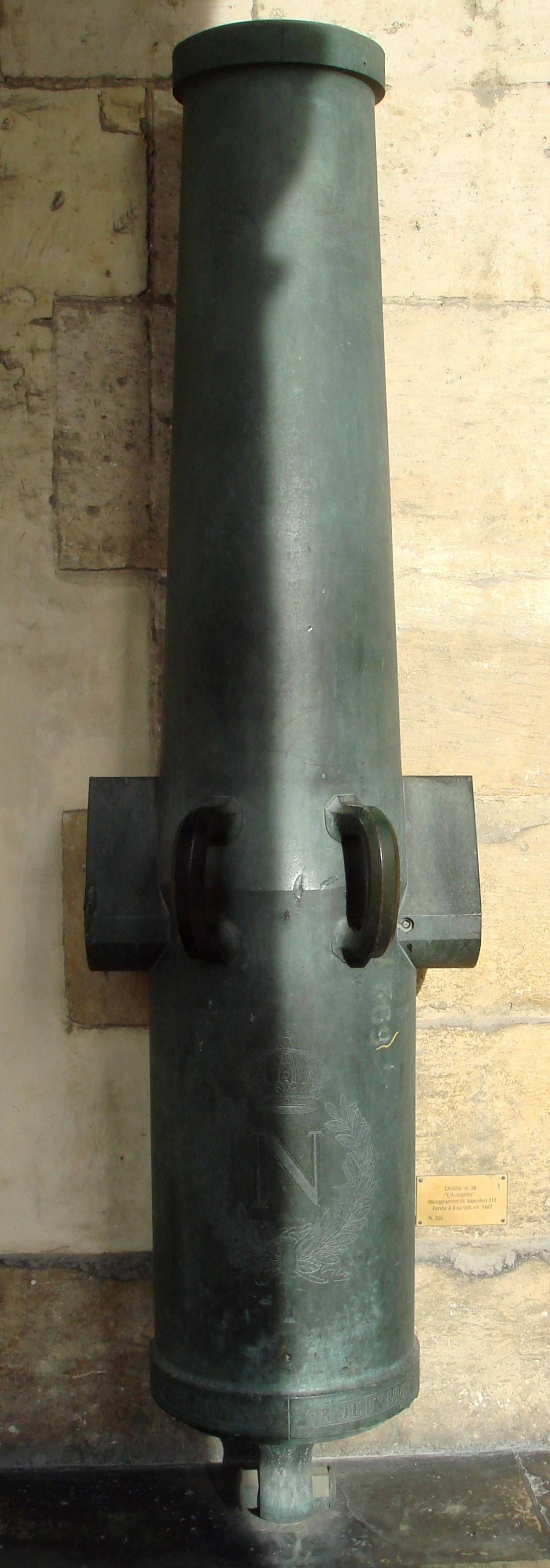
Canon de 24, L'Aubépine, 1867, Bourges.
