= Arnaud Ernest Junqua =

Solicitor and composer (1816–1893)

Arnaud Ernest Junqua (16 February 1816 in Lectoure – 31 January 1893), was a French officer of the Légion d'Honneur, captain of the cavalry regiment of the French Imperial Guard and Chief in second of the Cent-gardes Squadron. In the history of the squadron, Captain Junqua is described as an excellent human being, enough to tell true or invented stories, often invented, which were the joy of his comrades.

== Life ==
Arnaud Junqua was born in the family of the Empire marshal Jean Lannes, being him the grandson of Jeanne, marshal's sister. His grandfather Arnaud Junqua (1762-1834) was the first sous-préfet of Lectoure (from 1800 to 1816). He entered service in 1834, being promoted to captain on 19 February 1851. He served in the 1st Carabiniers-à-Cheval Regiment, and then in the Cuirassier Regiment of the Imperial Guard. On 23 May 1855 he became Chevalier of the Légion d'honneur and was promoted to the rank of officer of this legion on 12 April 1864. As Queen Victoria was visiting emperor Napoléon III and the international exhibition of 1855, she stopped before Arnaud Ernest Junqua, then in the Imperial Guard, a very tall man (2,04 meters) and said : "Oh, le bel officier !" (Oh, the handsome officer!). After this, the bel officier, seduced by the queen (she was 36, he was 39 years old), was supposed to be involved for her in a search of the famous diamond Koh-i-Nor. On 14 January 1857 he joined the Cent-gardes as captain, thus becoming the second in command of this elite group. As he was very tall, his own bed followed him in his travels.

He was promoted chief of squadrons on 14 March 1859 and shortly after he joined the 12th Dragons Regiment. He retired on 2 August 1870.
