= Imperial Guard (Napoleon III) =

French military unit (1854–1870)

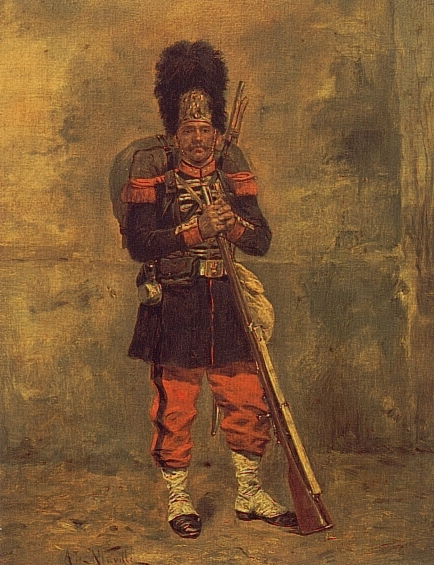
Grenadier of the Imperial Guard of Napoleon III

The Imperial Guard of Napoleon III (French: Garde impériale) was a military corps in the French Army formed by Napoleon III as a re-establishment of his uncle Napoleon I's Imperial Guard, with an updated version of the original uniforms and almost the same privileges.

== Origin ==
The Imperial Guard was formed by a decree of the emperor on 1 May 1854, and was made up of 17 regiments of cavalry, artillery and infantry, squadrons of train (supply and administration) and mounted gendarmes, and a division taken from the corps of military engineers. The emperor added a regiment of Zouaves to the Guard in 1855, selected from the three existing regiments of Zouaves first raised in 1830.

== Divisional structure ==
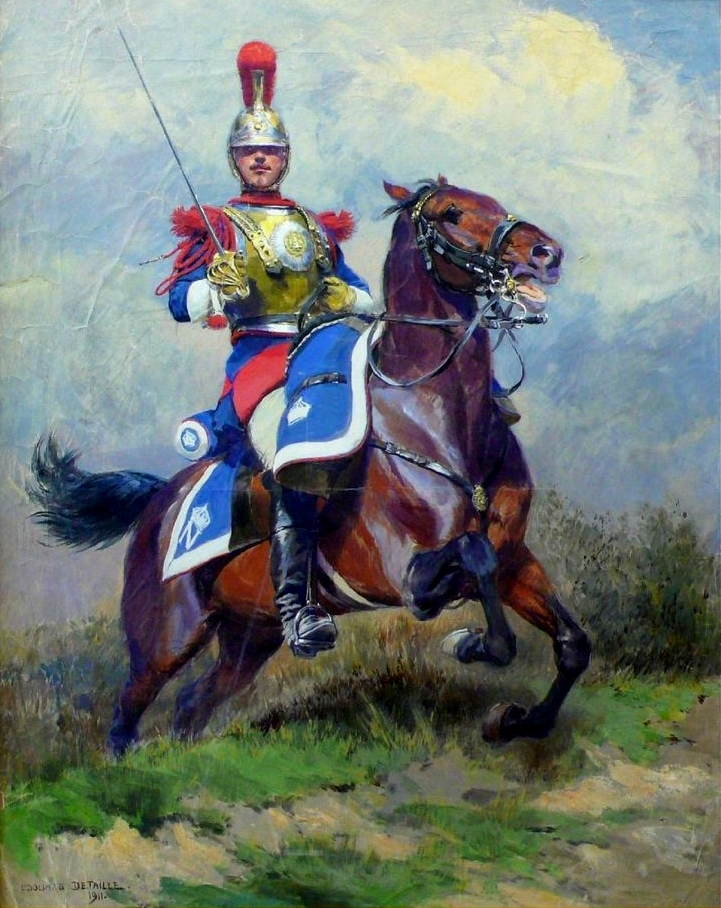
A Guard Carabinier (Carabinier de la Garde), part of the heavy brigade of the Guard Cavalry Division.

In its original 1854 structure the Imperial Guard comprised a mixed division of two infantry brigades (Grenadiers and Voltigeurs) plus one cavalry brigade of Cuirassiers and Guides. Additional units included two battalions of foot gendarmes, one battalion of Chasseurs a' pied, five batteries of Horse Artillery and a company of engineers.

During the 1860s the Imperial Guard was expanded to the size of a full army corps. This comprised the following divisions:

- 1st (Voltigeur) Division (four regiments of Voltigeurs plus one Chasseur battalion);

- 2nd (Grenadier) Division (three regiments of Grenadiers plus Guard Zouave regiment);

- Cavalry Division (comprised light brigade of Guides and Chasseurs; medium brigade of Dragoons and Lancers; heavy brigade of Cuirassiers and Carabiniers; and two batteries of Guard Horse Artillery);

- plus corps troops (four batteries of Horse Artillery, squadron of artillery train, squadron of regular train).

Each of the two infantry divisions were given a Mitrailleuse company in the late 1860s.

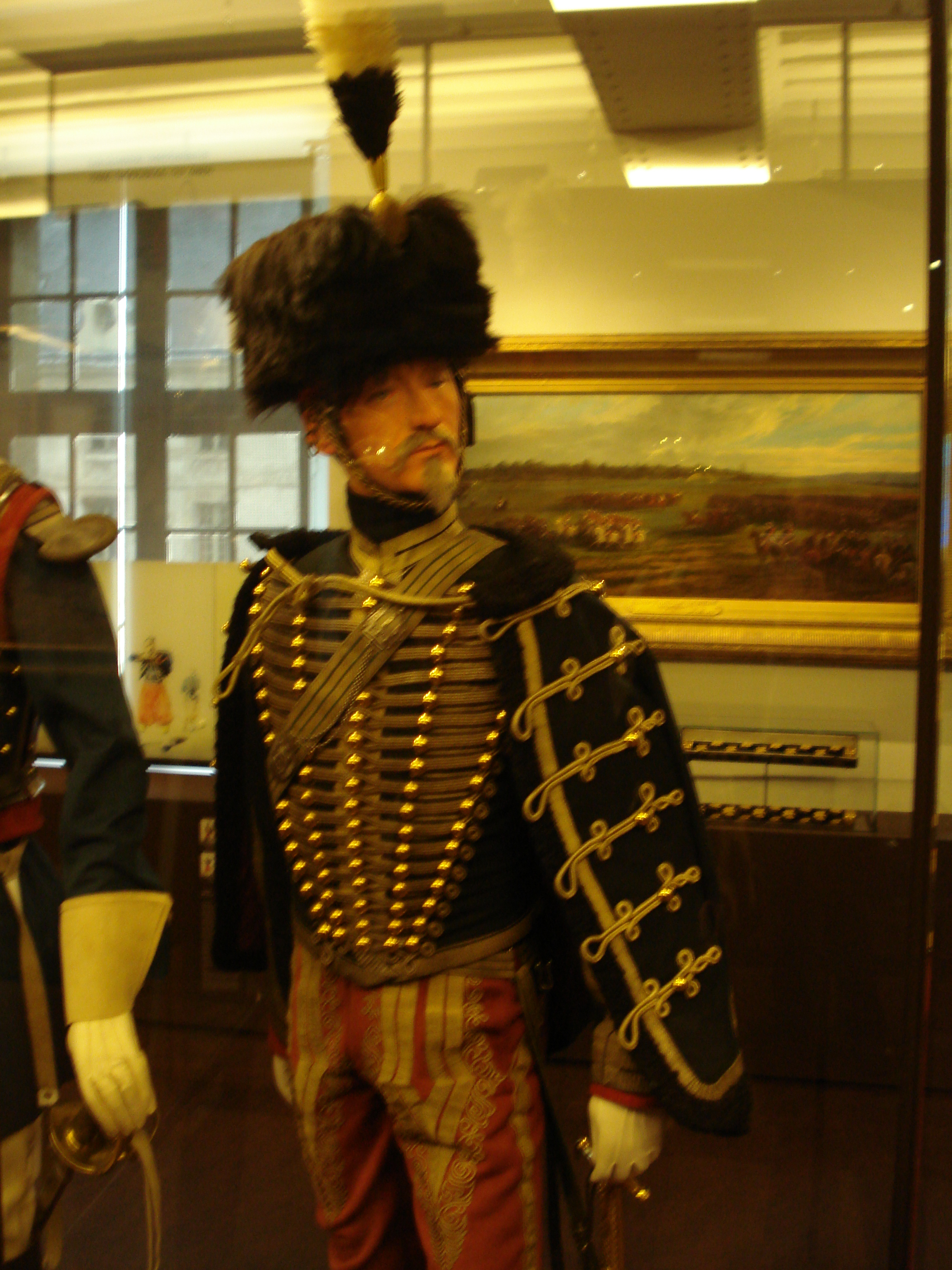
Uniform of the Mounted Guides of the Guard (guides a' cheval de la Garde) c1860, displayed in the Musée de l'Armée Paris

The decree of 1 May 1854 establishing the Imperial Guard required line regiments to nominate experienced soldiers of good character for the new units. This followed the pattern established by Napoleon I, of creating a corps of veterans which could be relied on to provide an elite force that would provide a dependable reserve in battle and be politically loyal in peace. As the Guard was expanded some recruits had to be directly drawn from each annual intake of conscripts, to make up the numbers required. Guardsmen received higher rates of pay and enjoyed better conditions of service than their counterparts in other regiments.

== Active service ==
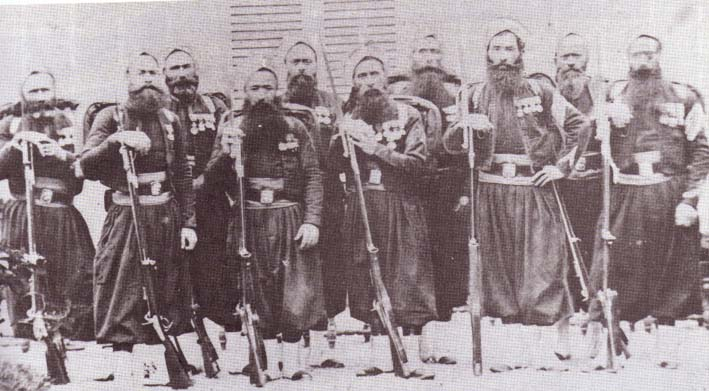
Guard Zouaves (Zouaves de la Garde) during the Second Italian War of Independence in 1859.

The Imperial Guard served with distinction in both the Crimean War and the Second Italian War of Independence of 1859. It did not participate in the Mexican Expedition of 1863-67 but remained on garrison duty in Paris. During the Franco-Prussian War of 1870 the Imperial Guard was present at the Battle of Mars-la-Tour, Battle of Gravelotte and the Siege of Metz. Although an elite corps which now numbered over 20,000, the Guard did not perform up to expectations in 1870. This was mainly due to poor judgement on behalf of its commanders, who at Mars-la-Tour committed guard units piecemeal rather than as a single entity in the tradition of the First Empire. At St. Privat two days later, the Guard was held back from battle by General Charles-Denis Bourbaki, to the bitterness of the line troops in the front line.

== Uniforms ==
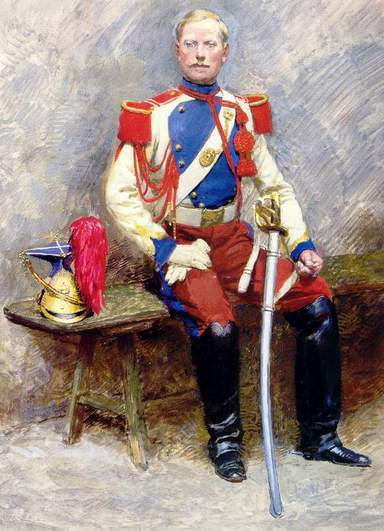
An officer of the Lancers of the Imperial Guard (Lanciers de la Garde impériale) in parade uniform.

The Imperial Guard retained a number of the more spectacular items of its predecessor Corps under Napoleon I, such as the bearskin headdress of the Grenadiers or the heavily braided dolman of the Horse Artillery. To these were added the common features which by 1870 had come to typify the French Army - notably the red trousers worn by most regiments. The Zouave regiment of the Imperial Guard had their distinctive North African style uniforms trimmed in yellow rather than the red of the other three Zouave regiments, with yellow instead of blue fez tassels.

== Disbandment ==
During the Franco-Prussian War the bulk of the Imperial Guard was amongst the army led by Marshal François Achille Bazaine, which was obliged to capitulate at Metz on 27 October 1870. The Guard was formally abolished by the new French Republican Government, following the fall of the Empire.

The 23 depot companies of the infantry of the Imperial Guard were brought together to form the 28th regiment de march which fought with distinction during the siege of Paris and subsequently became the 128th Regiment of the Line of the new French Army. Other units of the Imperial Guard also survived into the post-Imperial army of the Third Republic, under new titles and without their former special distinctions and privileges. Thus the depot companies of the Zouaves of the Imperial Guards provided the core of the new 4th Zouaves; and the 12th Cuirassiers was created from remnants of the Cent-Gardes, Guard Cuirassiers, Guard Carabiniers and Guides.

== Sundry ==
A row of houses in the English style were built in Rue Alquié, Vichy to accommodate officers of the Imperial Guard, when they escorted Napoleon III during his periodic visits to Vichy. The American officer Philip Kearny was attached to a cavalry unit of the Imperial Guard at the 1859 Battle of Solferino.

== Sources ==
- The New American Cyclopaedia: A Popular Dictionary of General Knowledge By George Ripley
- NYT
