= Life guard (military) =

Unit protecting high-ranking individuals

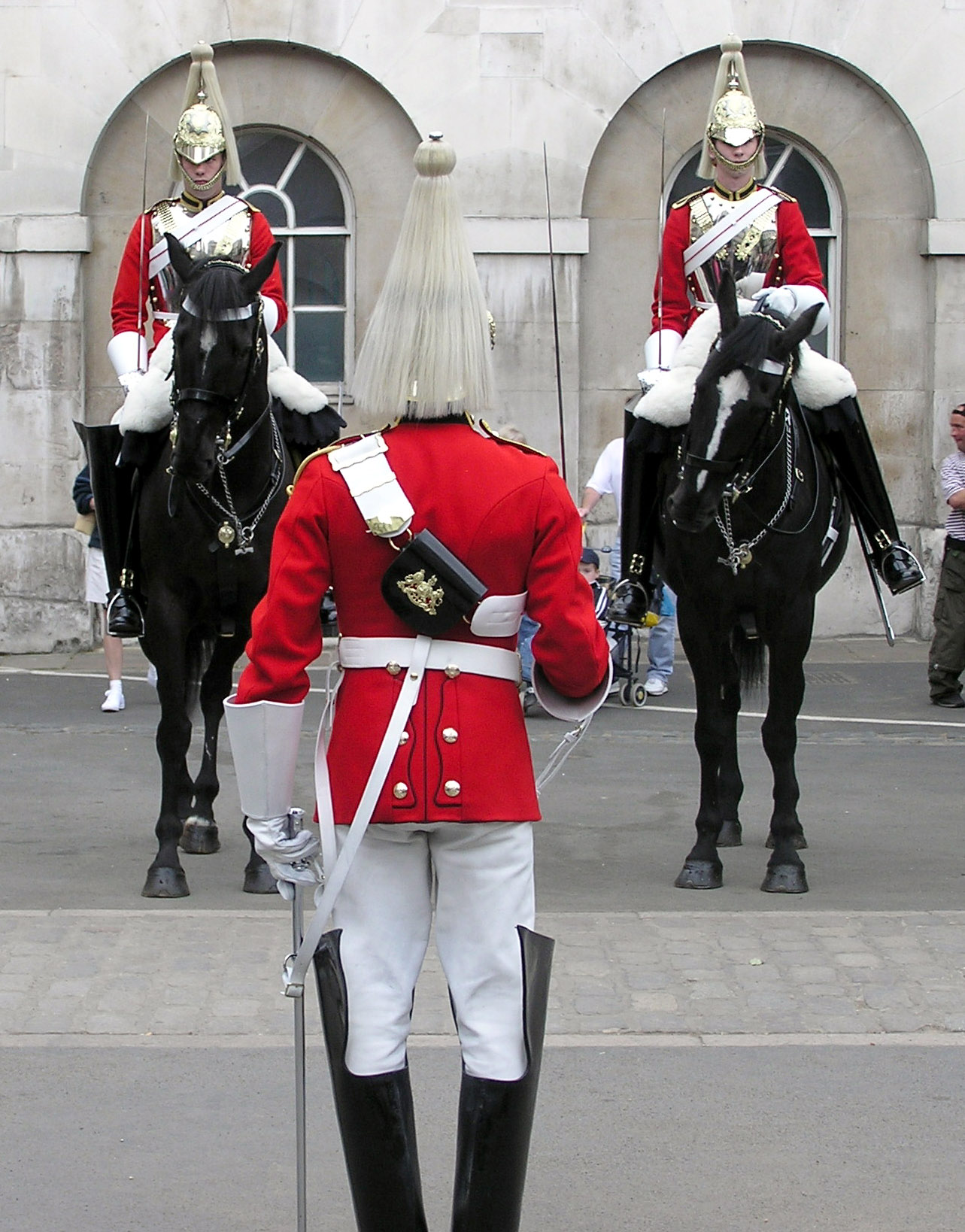
Changing of the guard in Whitehall, London

A life guard (also known as household troops) is a military unit charged with protecting a high-ranking individual, such as a monarch.

== Germany ==
Since the 15th century, Leibgarde has been the designation for the military security guards who protected Fürsten (royals and nobles) – usually members of the highest nobility who ruled over states of the Holy Roman Empire and later its former territory – from danger. The Leibgarde should not be mixed up with bodyguard (Leibwächter), which may refer also to a single private individual.

== France ==
In the Kingdom of France, the Garde du Corps was established (with reference to the sergents d'armes) in 1440. It was abolished after the French Revolution, re-established in 1815 after the Bourbon Restoration, and finally dissolved in 1830 after the July Revolution. In addition, Napoleon III set up the Cent-gardes for his own protection.

== List of life guard units ==
- Britain: Life Guards – part of the British Army
- Denmark: Royal Life Guards – part of the Danish Army
- Finland: Guard Jaeger Regiment – part of the Finnish Army
- Sweden: Life Guards – part of the Swedish Army

Former:

- Bavaria: Royal Bavarian Infantry Life Regiment – part of the Bavarian Army
- Kingdom of France: King's Bodyguards – part of the maison militaire du roi de France of the French Royal Army
- Nazi Germany: Leibstandarte SS „Adolf Hitler“ – incorporated into the Waffen-SS during World War II
- Ottoman Empire: Janissary Corps
- Prussia: Regiment of Gardes du Corps – part of the Guards Corps of the Prussian Army
- Russian Empire: Leib Guard – regiments of life guards that evolved into many elite combat units in the Imperial Russian Army
- United States: Commander-in-Chief's Guard or Washington's Life Guard – part of the Continental Army

== See also ==
- Royal guard
