= Antoine Treuille de Beaulieu =

French General

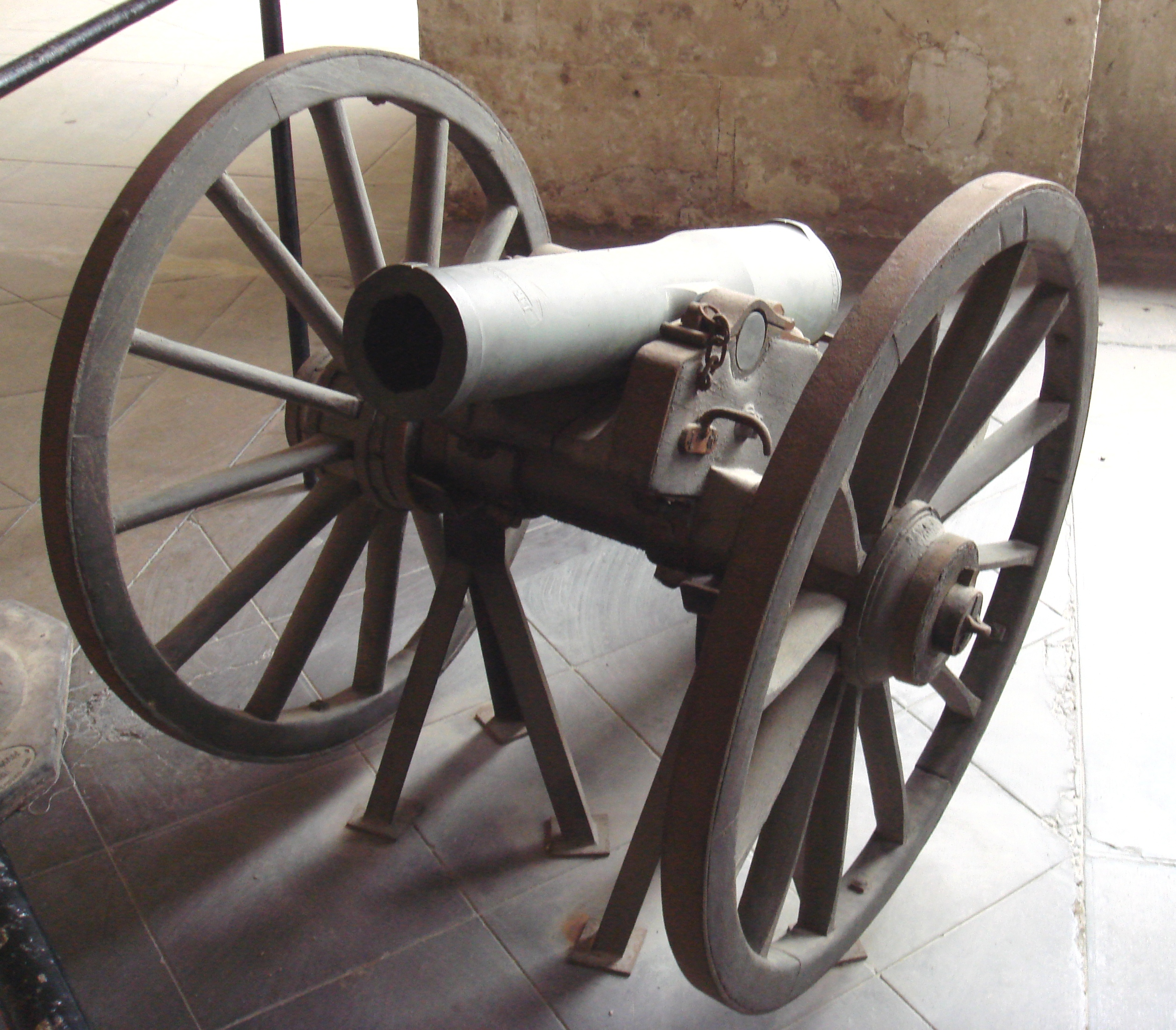
Rifled mountain cannon "Canon de montagne de 4 modèle 1859 Le Pétulant". Caliber: 86 mm. Length: 0.82 m. Weight: 101 kg (208 kg with carriage). Ammunition: 4 kg shell.

Count Antoine Hector Thésée Treuille de Beaulieu (French pronunciation: [ɑ̃twan ɛktɔʁ teze tʁœj də boljø]; 7 May 1809 – 24 July 1885) was a French General of the 19th century, who developed the concept of rifled guns in the French Army. He studied the subject of rifling between 1840, particularly in the famous Manufacture d'armes de Châtellerault, and 1852. Following a request by Napoleon III in 1854 to develop such a weapon, the de Beaulieu system was adopted by the French Army. It consisted in cutting six grooves inside the bore of a muzzle-loading cannon, and to use shells equipped with six lugs which would engage the grooves. This development was paralleled by that of the Armstrong gun in Great Britain (adopted in 1858 by the British Army).

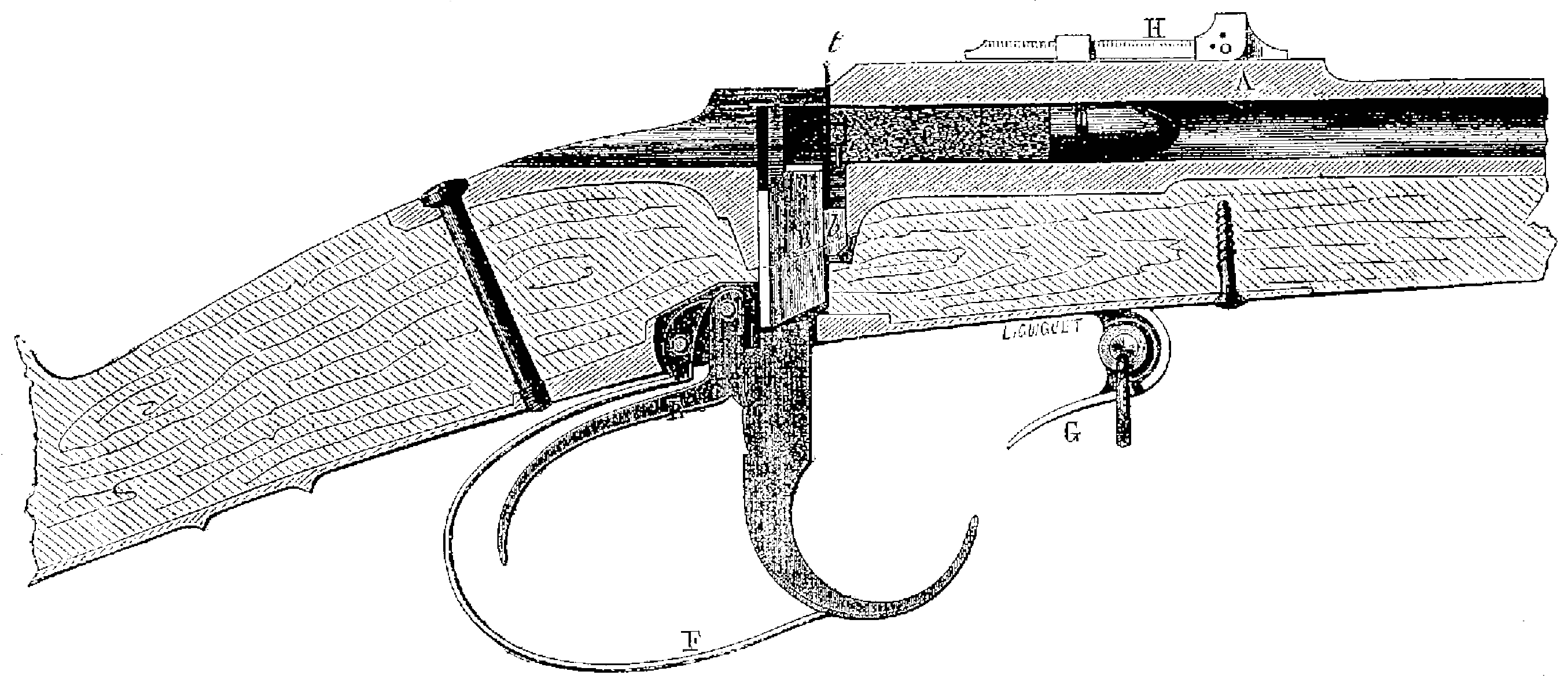
Cutaway of an open-bolt pinfire carbine developed by Treuille de Beaulieu

About the same time he developed a pinfire falling-block breech-loading carbine (mousqueton) for the Cent-gardes Squadron which was a bit ahead of its time in using a metallic cartridge and is very unusual (for a single-shot weapon) in that it fires from an open bolt.

These developments led to the introduction of the La Hitte system in 1858, a fully integrated system of muzzle-loading rifled guns. The Beaulieu 4-pounder rifled field-gun was adopted by the French Army in 1858, where it replaced the canon-obusier de 12, a smoothbore cannon using shells which was much less accurate and shorter-ranged.

The Beaulieu rifled artillery was first used in Algeria, and then in the Franco-Austrian War in Italy in 1859.

In 1842 he invented a prototype of the modern muzzle brake and had it tested in 1862.
