= Bohdan Khmelnytskyi National Academy of the State Border Service of Ukraine =

National Academy of the State Border Guard Service of Ukraine named after Bohdan Khmelnytskyi
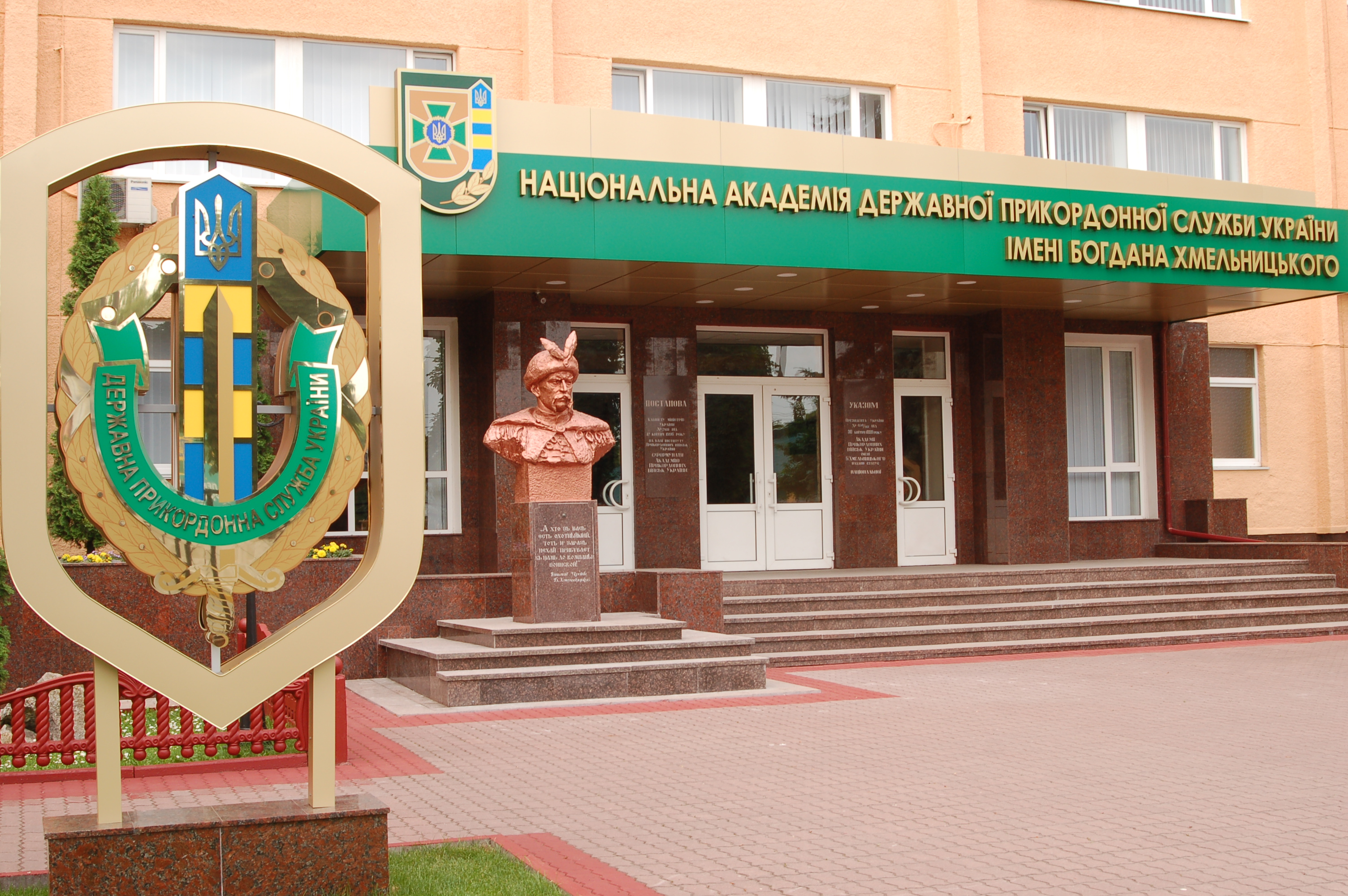
- The main entrance of the Academy
- Type: Public
- Established: December 14, 1992; 33 years ago
- Rector: Major General Oleksandr Lutskyi
- Location: Khmelnytskyi, Khmelnytskyi Oblast, Ukraine; 49.4190°N 27.0066°E
- Website: nadpsu.edu.ua/en/

The Bohdan Khmelnytskyi National Academy of the State Border Guard Service of Ukraine is a higher state educational institution of the IV accreditation level in the city of Khmelnytskyi. The only higher educational institution in Ukraine that trains officers for the State Border Guard Service of Ukraine. The scientific and pedagogical staff of the higher educational institution consists of 42 doctors of science, 201 candidates of science, including 27 professors, 111 associate professors and 6 senior researchers.

On December 14, 1992, in accordance with Resolution No. 700 of the Cabinet of Ministers of Ukraine, the Institute of the Border Troops of Ukraine was established on the funds of the disbanded Khmelnytskyi Higher Artillery Command School.
