= 3rd Dragoon Regiment (France) =

French dragoon regiment (1649-1997)

- 3e régiment de dragons
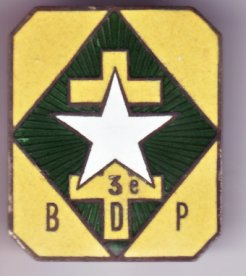
- Unit insignia (1937 -1941)
- Active: 17 January 1649 - 30 June 1997
- Country: France
- Allegiance: French Army
- Role: Dragoon
- Motto: "Ardet et Audet"
- Engagements: Nine Years' War; War of the Spanish Succession; War of the Polish Succession; War of the Austrian Succession; Seven Years' War; Corsican War; French Revolutionary Wars; Napoleonic Wars; World War I World War II

Flag of the regiment

The 3rd Dragoon Regiment (3e régiment de dragons or 3e RD) was a cavalry regiment in the French Army, it was active in various forms from 1649 to 1997.

== History ==
=== Ancien Règime ===
It was raised as an ordinary cavalry unit under the Ancien Régime in 1649 for the duc d'Enghien, son of the grand Condé. It was first named Enghien-Cavalry Regiment serving first in the Fronde against anti Bourbon forces. After valiantly serving in the War of Devolution, and the Dutch War, it was renamed the Bourbon-cavalerie in recognition for their service. As Bourbon-Cavalry Regiment, this unit served in all of the wars below:

• War of the League of Augsburg (1688- 1697)

• War of the Spanish Succession (1701- 1713)

• War of the Polish Succession (1733- 1735)

• War of the Austrian Succession (1740- 1748) • Battle of Corbach (Seven Years' War 1756- 1763)

• Corsican War (1769)

The Regiment was soon elevated to become a dragoon. Their new title was " Bourbon Dragoon Regiment." Another regiment, the Clermont-Tonnerre Regiment (Noah's Regiment) was incorporated into the regiment, recently pulled out of the War of the Austrian Succession, now reentering combat. The royal decree of January 1791, reorganized the Cavalry of the French Army. The Bourbon Dragoon Regiment was renamed the Bourbon Regiment of Dragoons.

=== Revolutionary Wars ===
Joining the Northern Army in 1792, the Bourbon Regiment was reclassified as the 3rd Dragoon Regiment. This regiment will serve in the ensuing battles of Valmy and Jemappes. In 1794, the 3rd Dragoons were still fighting with the Army of the North, fighting at Sprimont, and attended Complementary day festivals. In 1796, the 3rd Dragoons were sent to the Army of Italy, crossing the Arcole Bridge and defeating Austrian/Coalition forces. The Dragoons were also part of the expedition to Egypt, fighting against local Ottoman forces, distinguishing themselves at the Battle of Aboukir. Returning from the expedition, the 3rd Dragoons rejoined the Army of Italy, becoming part of the reserve.

=== Napoleonic Wars ===
In 1805, the 3rd Dragoon Regiment was reorganized along with the rest of the army, and was placed under I Corps. In the same year, they would participate in the Battle of Austerlitz, another victory. In 1806, they were put under the 6th Cavalry Reserve Corp, clashing against Prussian forces at Jena, then against Russian forces at Elyau, and again at Friedland, before joining an observation Corp.

In 1808, the 3rd Dragoons were part of the Army of Portugal, and after an invasion of Portugal failed, became part of the Army of Spain, and joined the Grande Armèè in the invasion of Spain. After a year, the 3rd Dragoons were reorganized into the 2nd Regiment of Light Horse Lancers (2ème Régiment de Chevaulégers Lanciers) (fr:2e régiment de chevau-légers lanciers). This regiment would be very active in the following battles and invasions:

Russian Campaign

• Battle of the Moskva River

• Battle of Berezina

German Campaign

• Battle of Katzbach

• Battle of Hanau

Campaign in France

• Battle of La Rothière

• Battle of Montmirail

• Battle of Vauchamps

• Battle of Bar-sur-Aube

• Battle of Fère

Reinforced with elements of 7th Regiment of Light Horse Lancers, the 2nd Regiment of Light Horse Lancers was renamed Queen's Regiment of Lancers (Régiment Lanciers de La Reine). After the Bourbons returned to France, the 2nd Regiment of Light Horse Lancers was reintegrated into the 3rd Dragoon Regiment. Then, Napoleon returned from exile and the 2nd Regiment of Light Horse Lancers was the title again. Serving the Belgian Campaign, they fought at the Battle of Waterloo, but were repulsed.

=== Bourbon Restoration ===
Following the Bourbon Restoration, the 3rd Dragoon Regiment was reinstalled in the place of the 2nd Regiment of Light Horse Lancers.

=== French Republic ===
==== Chatou Station ====
In 1848, protesting insurgency in Paris resulted in the fire of Chatou Railway Bridge, and destroyed the Chatou train station. They in turn were driven out by the guard of the 3rd Dragoons. The 3rd Dragoon Regiment would stay as reserve for the French Army until 1914.

==== World War I ====
At the start of World War I, the 3rd Dragoon Regiment was stationed at Nantes, blocking the German advance in 1914.

===== 1914-1917 =====
The 3rd Dragoons fought at the First Battle of the Marne, probing German attacks. The Germans cannot break through. For most of the War, the 8th Dragoons will be stationed there.

===== 1918 =====
• Battle of Château Thierry

• Second Battle of the Marne

==== Peacetime ====
The 3rd Dragoons are assigned the occupation of the German Saarland, and was temporarily renamed 3rd Battalion Dragoons.

==== World War II ====
===== 1939 =====
The 3rd Dragoon Regiment begins mobilization.

===== 1940 =====
After attack by the Germans, the 3rd Dragoons split into two groups. They were pushed from the Ardennes to the Luxembourg-French Border. In the ensuing retreat, the 3rd Dragoon Regiment was wiped out by the German armored units rushing through the gap. The regiment will not be reformed, but the remainder will eventually join the resistance.

=== 1976- 1997 ===
In 1976, the 3rd Dragoon Regiment was reestablished from units of 5th Hussar Regiment, taking over their role in West Germany. At the time, the 3rd Dragoons numbered around 793 combat troops, 65 AMX, and 13 ATV. They will be also reinforced with the 294th Panzer battalion, which in turn will be deployed at Hueberg. The 3rd Dragoons will see no actual combat action, and was dissolved in 1997.

== Garrisons ==
Toulouse Barracks (1816)

Belfort Barracks (1838)

Tour Barracks (1871)

Nantes (1886)

Saarlouis and Saarbrücken (1921) Occupation of Germany

Sarreguemines and Saint-Avold (1927)

Lunèville Barracks (1929)

Castres (1940)

Stetten am Kalten Markt (1976) Sector occupying

== Head of Corps (Colonel Generals) of 3rd Dragoon Regiment ==
=== Old Règime ===
==== Enghien Cavalry Regiment ====
Commanders:

• Henry Jules de Bourbon Condé, Duke of Enghien (1649- 1650)

• Jean de Coligny, Count of Saligny (1651)

• Count of Romainville (1659)

• Hèrard Bouton, Marquis de Chamilly (1659- 1665)

• Gaspard de Champagne, Duke of La Suze (1665- 1671)

• Marquis de Lanmary (1671- 1681)

• Count of Xaintrailles (1681- 1686)

==== Bourbon Cavalry Regiment ====
Head of Corps:

• Count of Xaintrailles (1686- 1690)

• Count of La Chapelle- Balon (1690- 1692)

• N. de Choiseul, Marquis de Lanques (1672- 1702)

• N. de Royer, Count of Saint Micaud (1702- 1719)

• N. de Crussol d'Uzès, Marquis of Montausier (1719- 1730)

• François Emmanuel de Crussol d'Uzès, Marquis de Crussol des Salles (1730- 1744)

• Louis Joseph Nicolas, Marquis de Cambis (1744- 1761)

• Gabriel Augustin de Franquetot, Count of Coigny (1761- 1762)

• Louis, Viscount of Noah (1762- 1770)

• Amable Charles, Marquis de La Guiche (1770- 1776)

==== Bourbon Dragoon Regiment ====
Dragoon Commander:

• Amable Charles, Marquis de La Guiche (1776- 1788)

• Jean François Lèonor, Baron of Hunolstein (1788- 1789)

• Anne Michel Louis, Viscount of Roncherolles (1789- 1791)

=== Revolutionary and Napoleonic Wars ===
==== 3rd Dragoon Regiment ====
Colonel and Brigade leaders:

• Colonel Renè Pierre Louis (1791- 1792)

• Colonel Anne Hyacinthe (1792)

• Colonel Paul Alexandre (1792- 1793)

• Brigade leader Marie Joseph (1793- 1794)

• Leader of Brigade, Paul Guillaume Daunant (1794- 1796)

• Head of Brigade, Andrè François Bron de Bailly (1796- 1800)

• Leader of Brigade, Edmè Nicolas Fiteau (1800- 1806)

• Colonel Joseph Claude Grézard (1806- 1810)

• Colonel Pierre Marie-Auguste Berruyer (1810- 1811)

==== 2nd Regiment of Light Horse Lancers ====
Head of Corp:

• Colonel Pierre Berruyer (1811- 1814)

• Colonel Jean Joannès (1814)

• Colonel Jean-Baptiste Sourd (1814- 1815)

=== Bourbon Restoration ===
==== Dragoons of the Garonne ====
Colonels:

• Colonel Jean Baptiste Dubessy (1814- 1815)

• Colonel Lignyville (1815- 1816)

• Colonel Pùsy (1816- 1822)

• Colonel Bergeret (1822- 1825)

==== 3rd Dragoon Regiment ====
• Colonel Bergeret (1825- 1830)

• Colonel Bougainville (1830)

• Colonel Desaix (1830- 1831)

• Colonel Drémond (1831- 1841)

• Colonel Maisonneuvre (1841- 1849)

=== French Republic ===
==== 3rd Dragoon Regiment ====
Colonels:

• Colonel Gasten (1849)

• Colonel Marion (1850- 1851)

• Colonel Estampres (1852- 1861)

• Colonel Brauer (1861- 1868)

• Colonel Bilhau (1869- 1870)

• Colonel Michel-Aloys Ney (1870- 1871)

• Colonel Barbut (1873- 1876)

• Colonel Barbault (1876)

• Colonel Lovencourt (1876- 1882)

• Colonel Ouguen (1882)

• Colonel Duvivier (1882- 1889)

• Colonel Beaumarchais (1889- 1897)

• Colonel Seroux (1897- 1903)

• Colonel Louvat (1903- 1908)

• Colonel Chene (1908- 1909)

• Colonel Lechevrel (1909- 1913)

• Colonel Schmidt (1914- 1918)

• Colonel Motterouge (1918- 1919)

• Colonel Chaillou (1919)

• Colonel Teillais (1919- 1921)

• Colonel Rivain (1921- 1925)

• Lieutenant Colonel Baciocchi (1925- 1929)

==== 3rd Dragoon Battalion ====
Squadron Leaders:

• Squadron Leader Ricklin (1929- 1936)

• Squadron Leader Renè de Reboul (1936- 1939)

==== 3rd Dragoon Regiment ====
• Lieutenant Colonel Renè de Reboul (1939- 1940)

=== Vichy France ===
==== 3rd Dragoon Division (Armistice Army) ====
• Colonel Amanrich (1940- 1942)

=== Liberation of France ===
==== 3rd Dragoon ====
• Squadron Leader Audibert Lessan (1942- 1944)

==== 3rd Regiment of Dragoons (Free French) ====
• Squadron Leader Segonzac (1944- 1945)

=== 5th French Republic ===
==== 3rd Dragoon Regiment ====
Lieutenant Colonels:

• Lieutenant Colonel Royer (1976- 1977)

• Lieutenant Colonel Arlabosse (1977- 1979)

• Lieutenant Colonel Ernould (1979- 1981)

• Lieutenant Colonel Bizet (1981- 1983)

• Lieutenant Colonel Vergé (1983- 1985)

• Colonel Elie (1985- 1987)

• Colonel Lasserre (1987- 1989)

• Colonel Le Roy (1989- 1992)

• Lieutenant Colonel Péron (1992- 1994)

• Lieutenant Colonel Chevallier-Chantepie (1994- 1996)

• Colonel Le Bot (1996- 1997) *Regiment disbanded*

== Tradition and Uniforms ==
Motto: 'He burns and he dares.'

=== Uniforms ===
==== Ancien Règime, Uniform of the Bourbon Cavalry (1757- 1791) ====
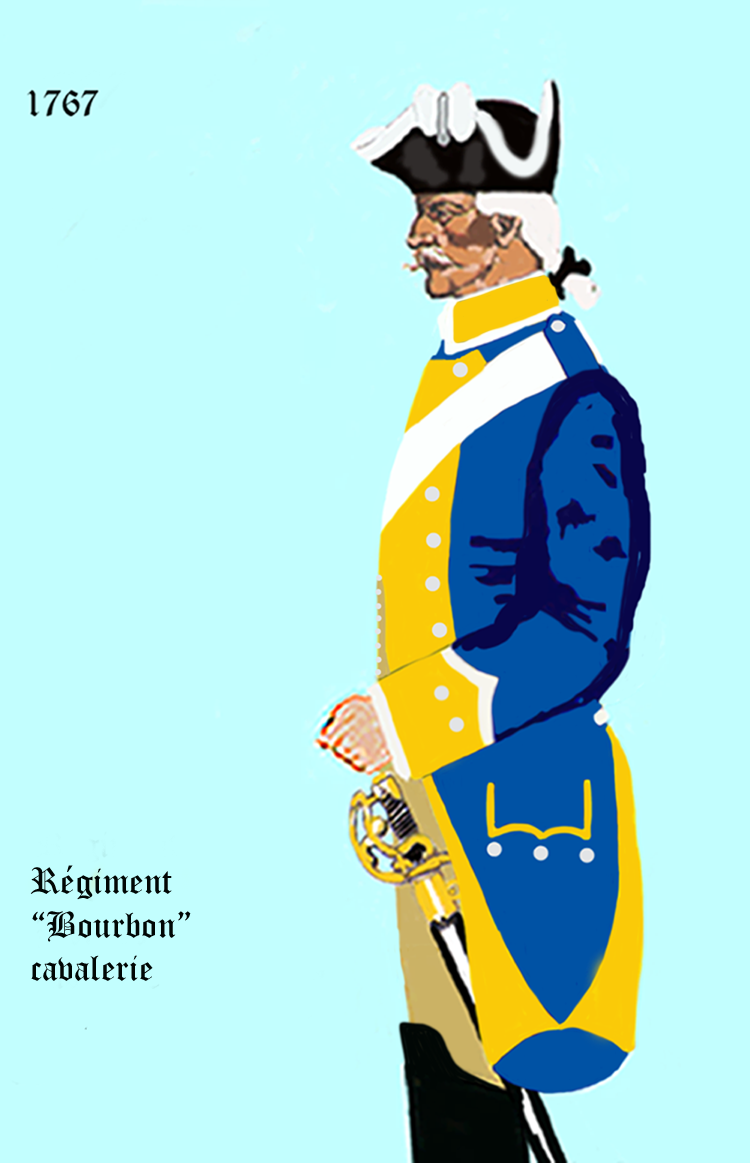
Uniform of the Bourbon Cavalry from 1767 to 1776

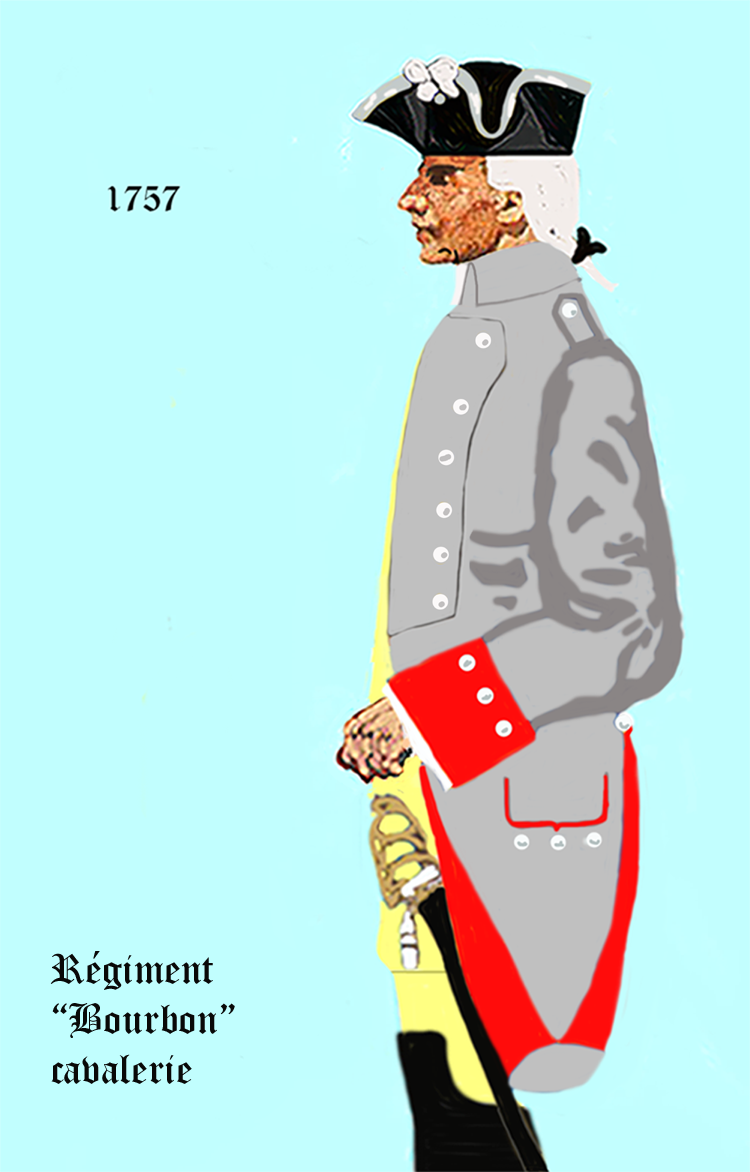
Uniform of the Bourbon Cavalry from 1757 to 1762

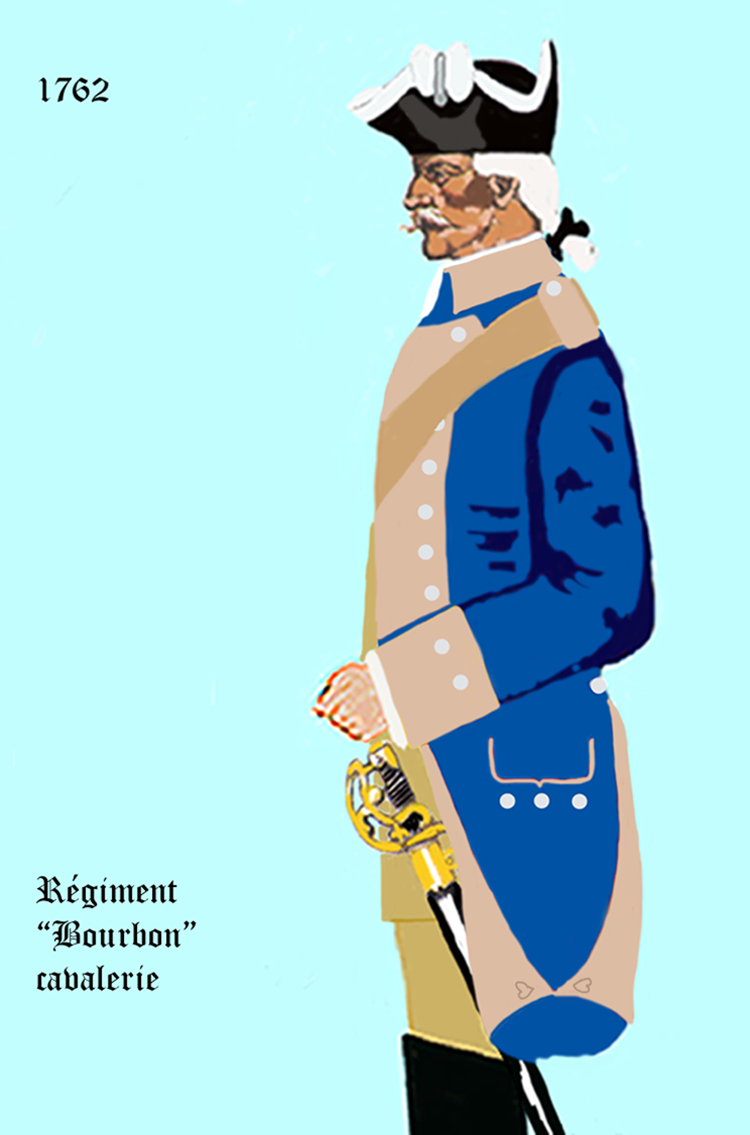
Uniform of the Bourbon Cavalry from 1762 to 1767

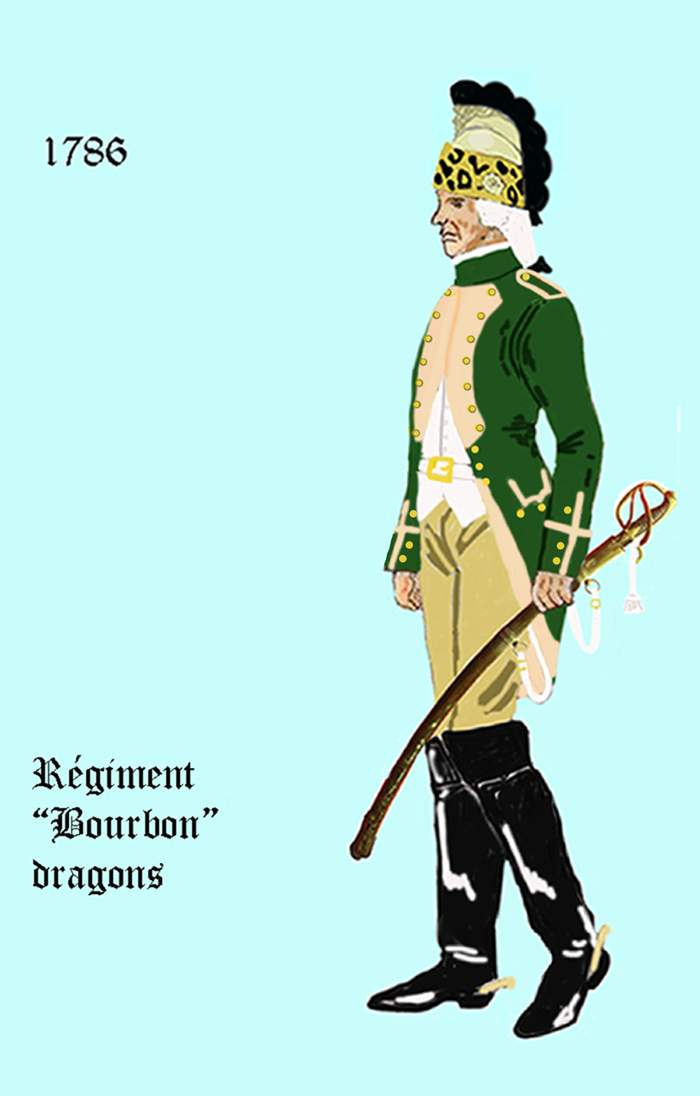
Uniform of the Bourbon Cavalry from 1786 to 1791

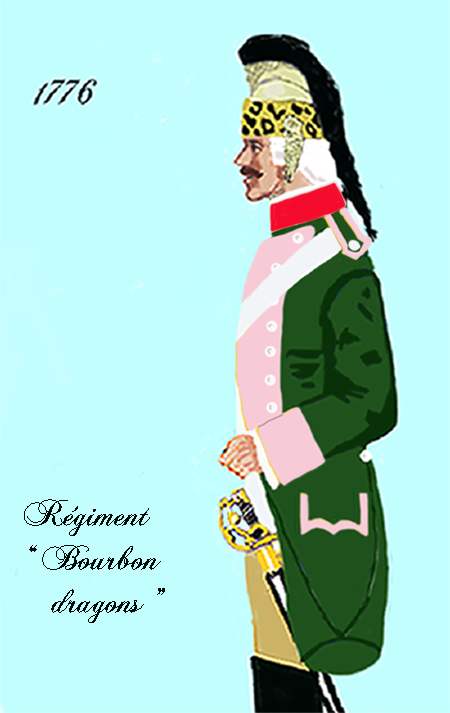
Uniform of the Bourbon Cavalry from 1776 to 1779

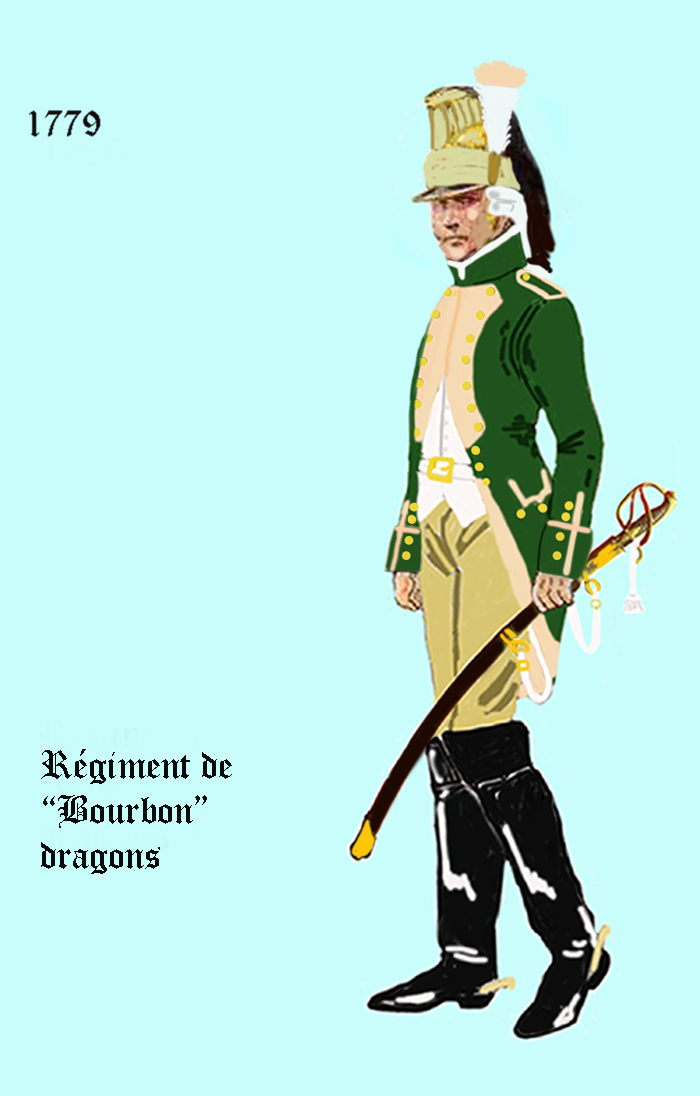
Uniform of the Bourbon Cavalry from 1779 to 1786

==== Revolutionary Wars, Uniform of the 3rd Dragoon Regiment (1791) ====
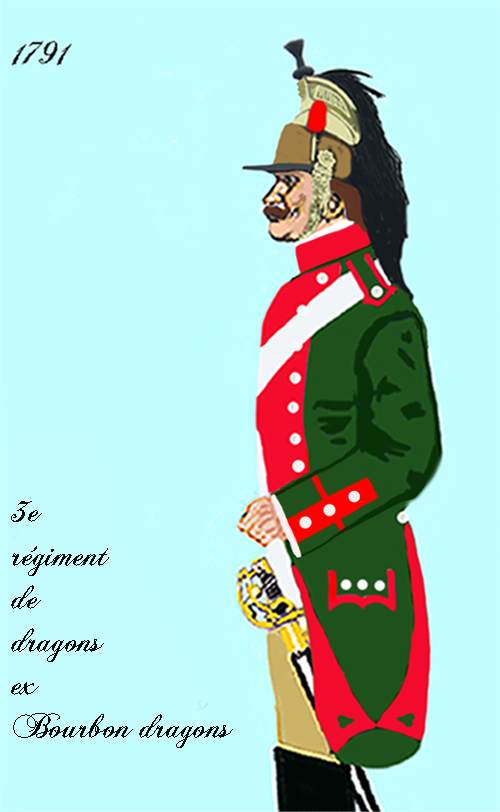
Uniform of the 3rd Dragoon Regiment in 1791

==== Napoleonic Wars, Uniform of the 2nd Regiment of Light Horse Lancers (1811) ====
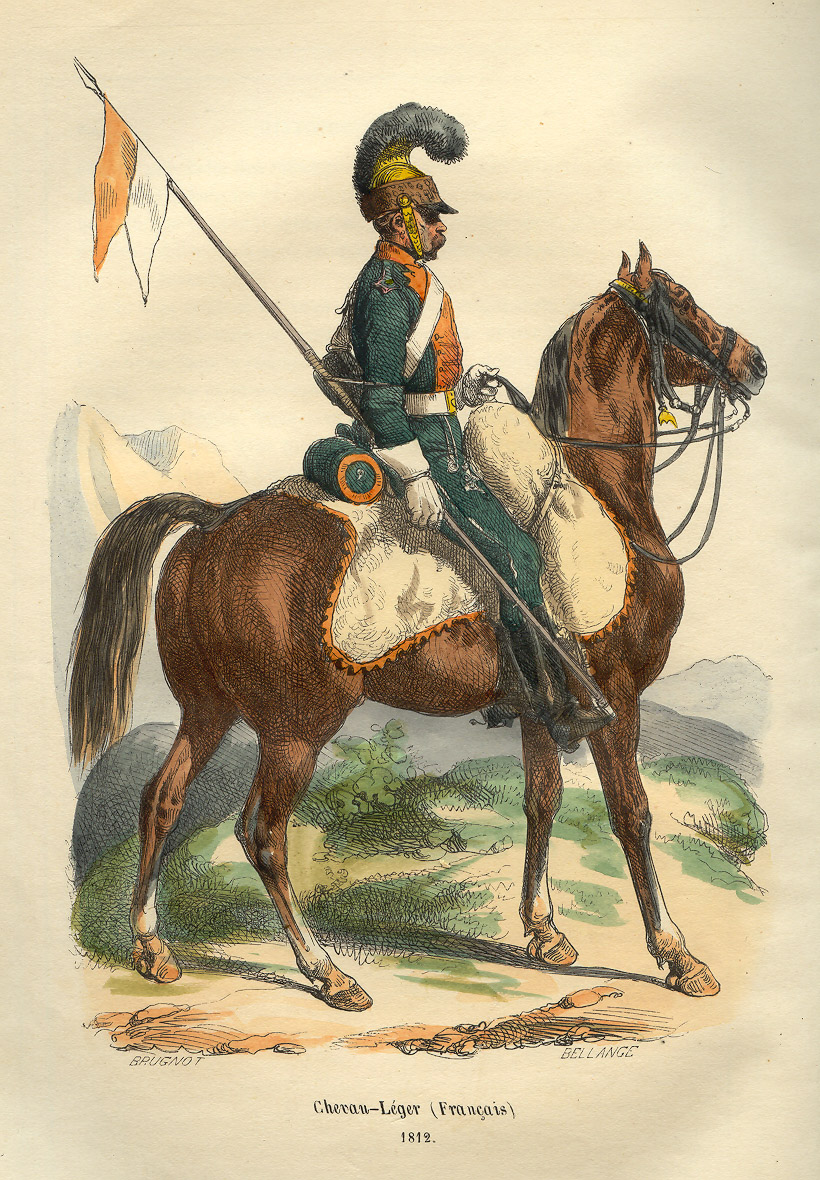
A cavalry officer of the 2nd Regiment of Light Horse Lancers (1811)

==== July Monarchy, 3rd Dragoon Regiment ====
A quartermaster from the 3rd Dragoon Regiment during the July Monarchy.

=== Standards ===
==== Ancien Règime, Condè Cavalry, Bourbon Cavalry Regiment (1740- 1791) ====
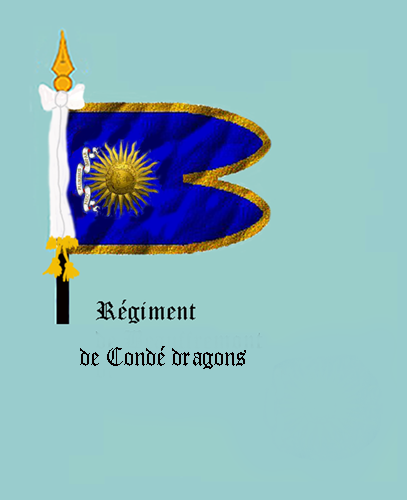
Condé Cavalry standard in 1791

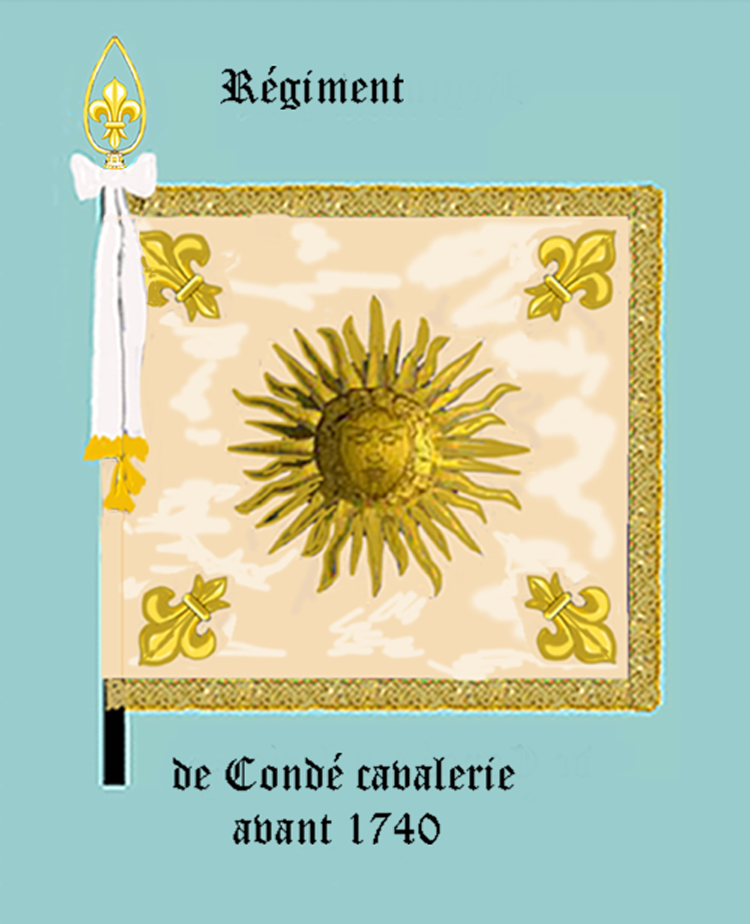
Condé Cavalry standard in 1740

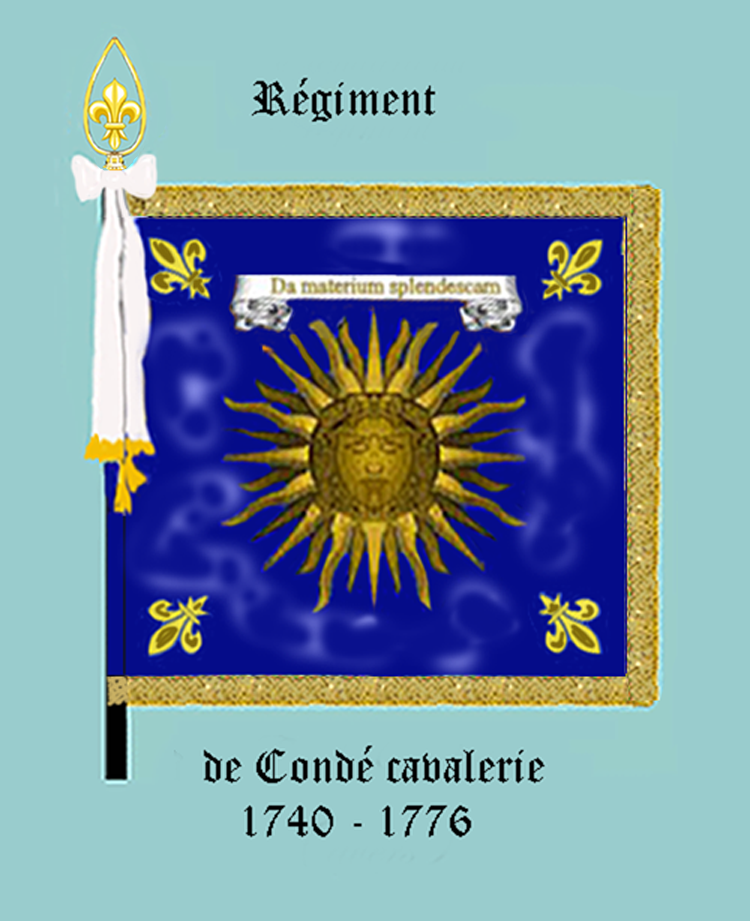
Another standard from Condé Cavalry (1740- 1776)

==== Napoleonic Wars, 2nd Regiment of Light Horse Lancers (1812) ====
This is the standard of the 2nd Regiment of Light Horse Lancers, given to them in 1812. It has the following words in order:

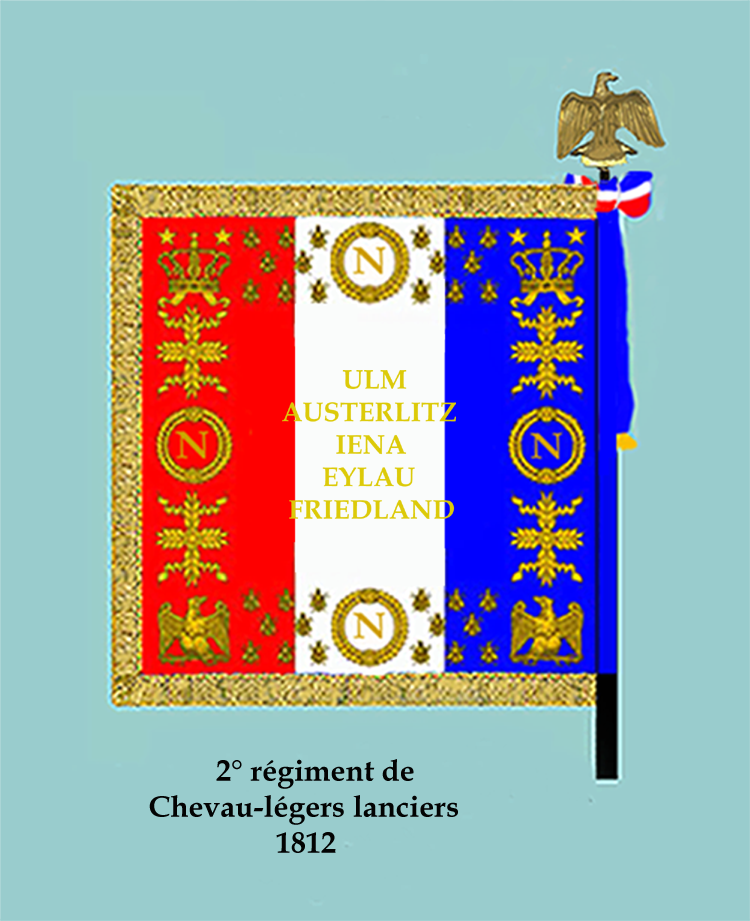
The standard in 1812

• Ulm

• Austerlitz

• Jena

• Eylau

• Friedland

In 1815, a new standard was made, now without the imperial seal, but the same still.

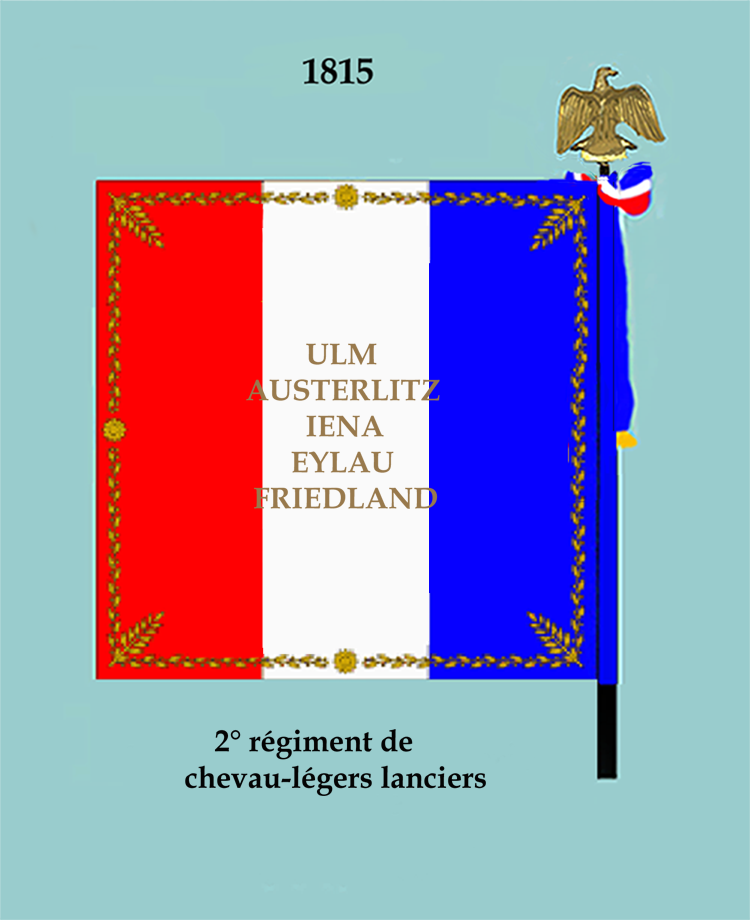
Standard of 1815

==== 1945- Present ====
After World War II ended, the standard of the 3rd Dragoon Regiment will not gain another title on its list. This is the standard of the regiment starting from 1997.

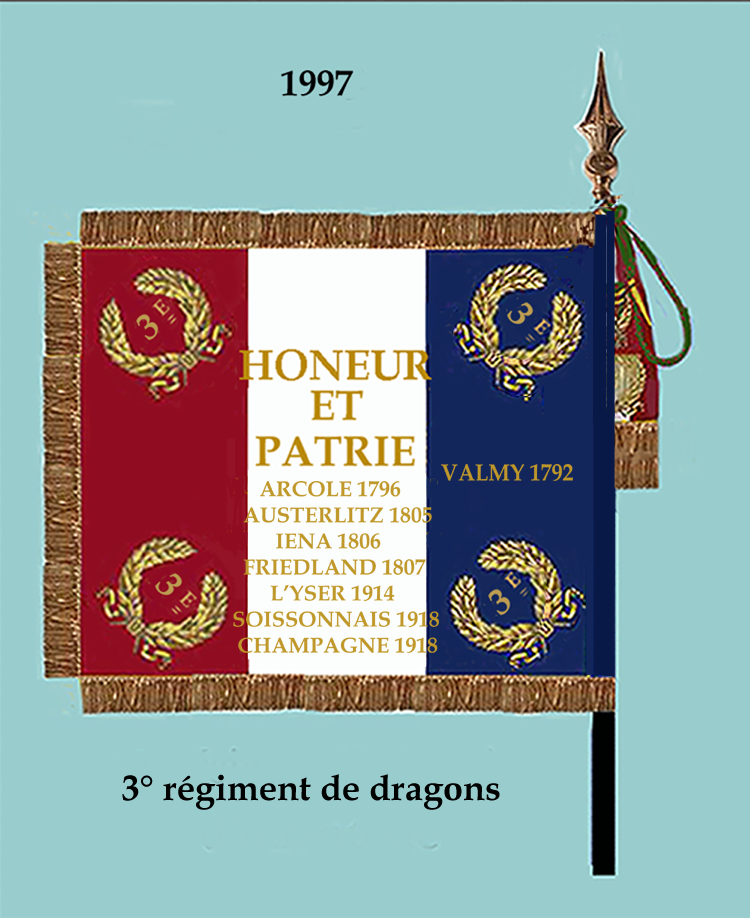
The standard since 1997

=== Decorations ===
==== Badges ====
The badges of the 3rd Dragoon Regiment have changed over time, with the first made before World War II.

==== Distinguished honors ====
The tie is decorated:

• From the 1914- 18 war cross, two palm leaves, and 4 vermeil stars.

• From the Croix de Guerre 1939- 45, one palm leaf

• A foddler in the colors of the 1914- 18 war cross

== Sources ==
- Wierre, André de Bonnières de (1892). Historique du 3e Régiment de dragons, 1649-1892 (in French). Bourgeois.
