= D'Aboville =

D'Aboville is a French surname. Notable people with the surname include:

- Augustin Gabriel d'Aboville (1773–1820), French soldier, politician, and officer
- Augustin-Marie d'Aboville (1776–1843), French military officer
- François Marie d'Aboville (1730–1817), French major general
- Gérard d'Aboville (born 1945), French rower and politician
