= Horse Artillery of the Imperial Guard =

French military unit, 1806 to 1815

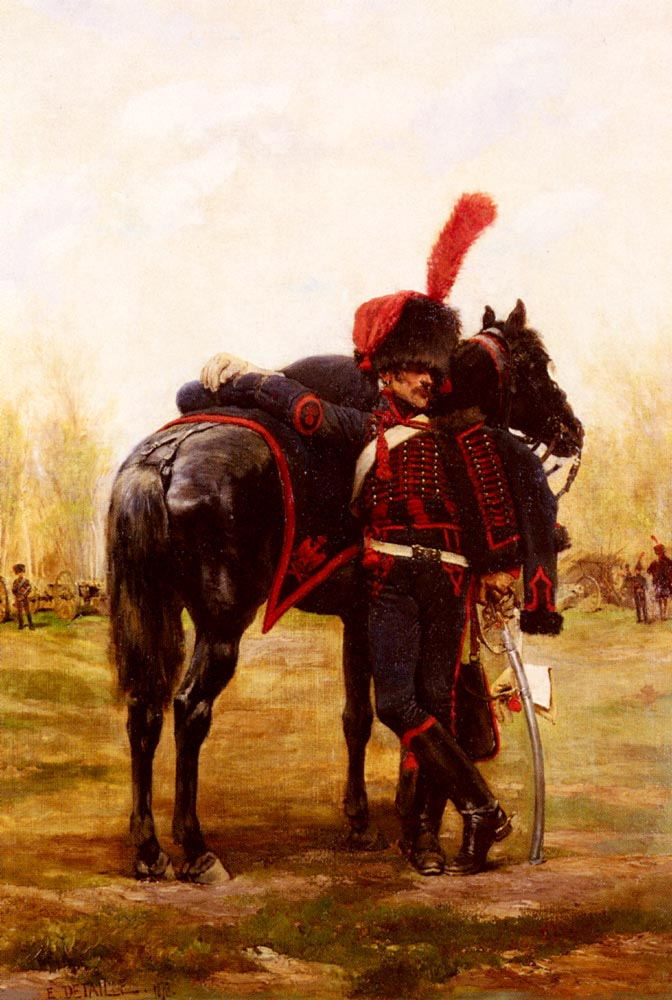
- Horse artilleryman of the Imperial Guard. Oil painting by Édouard Detaille, 1870.
- Active: 1806–1815
- Country: France
- Allegiance: First French Empire
- Branch: Grande Armée
- Role: Artillery
- Engagements: Battle of Austerlitz; Battle of Friedland; Battle of Wagram; Battle of Borodino; Battle of Waterloo

Commanders
- Current commander: Doguereau (1806–1808); Augustin-Marie d'Aboville (1808–1809); Jean-Jacques Desvaux de Saint-Maurice (1809–1813); Griois (1813–1814); Duchand de Sancey (1815)

The Horse Artillery of the Imperial Guard is a mounted artillery unit integrated into Napoleon I's Imperial Guard. Although it was not formed as a regiment until April 1806, its origins date back to May 1797, when it was first trained in the Army of Italy.

Initially organized into three squadrons, the Guard's horse artillerymen took part in the Prussian and Polish campaigns, in particular the battles of Jena, Eylau and Friedland. They took part in the Spanish War in 1808, the Austrian Campaign in 1809 and the Russian Campaign in 1812.

The unit again took an active part in the German campaign of 1813 and the French campaign of 1814, before being disbanded by royal decree on 12 May 1814 and transferred back to the line regiments.

The régiment d'artillerie à cheval de la Garde was reformed in 1815 during the Hundred Days and took part in the Belgian campaign. It was definitively disbanded after Napoleon's second abdication and the return of the Bourbons.

== Origins of the Regiment ==
The story of the Guard's horse artillerymen began on May 30, 1797, when Napoleon Bonaparte, then at the head of the Army of Italy, created a horse artillery section of 30 gunners from his companies of escort guides. Satisfied with this organization, which combined firepower and mobility, he repeated the operation in the Army of the East, this time forming a half-company of 60 men.

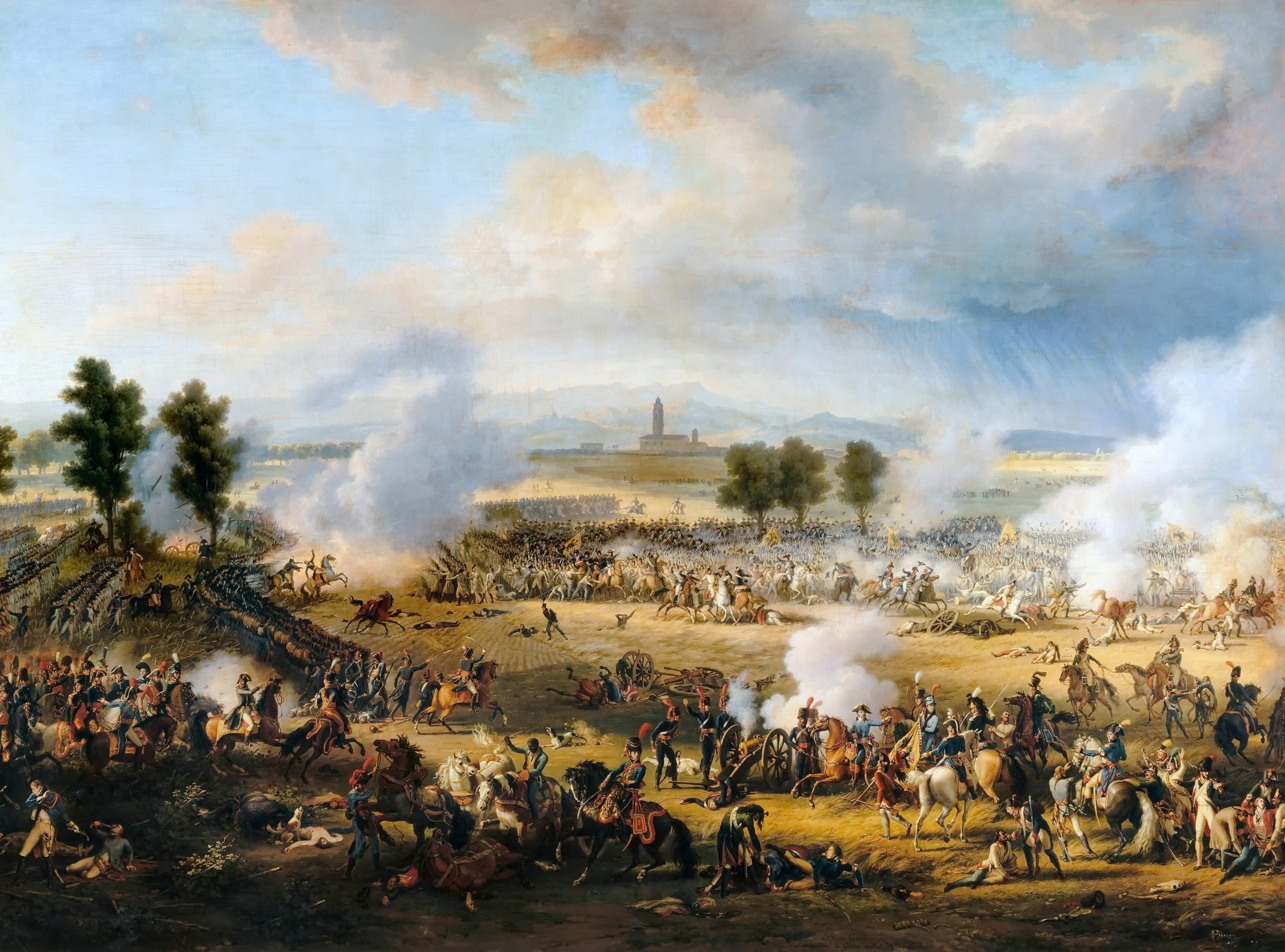
The Battle of Marengo by Louis-François Lejeune, 1801

After the coup d'état of 18 Brumaire, Bonaparte created the Garde des Consuls, which included a company of horse artillery. This company particularly distinguished itself at the battles of Montebello and Marengo. The horse artillerymen were increased to the size of a squadron after a second company was created on 25 August 1802, incorporating the last cannoneer-guides from the Army of the East.

On 29 July 1804, the Imperial Guard was formed by imperial decree, incorporating the horse artillery squadron. This squadron took part in the Battle of Austerlitz on 2 December 1805, supporting the attack of the Guard cavalry with 16 guns in two batteries.

== Organization ==
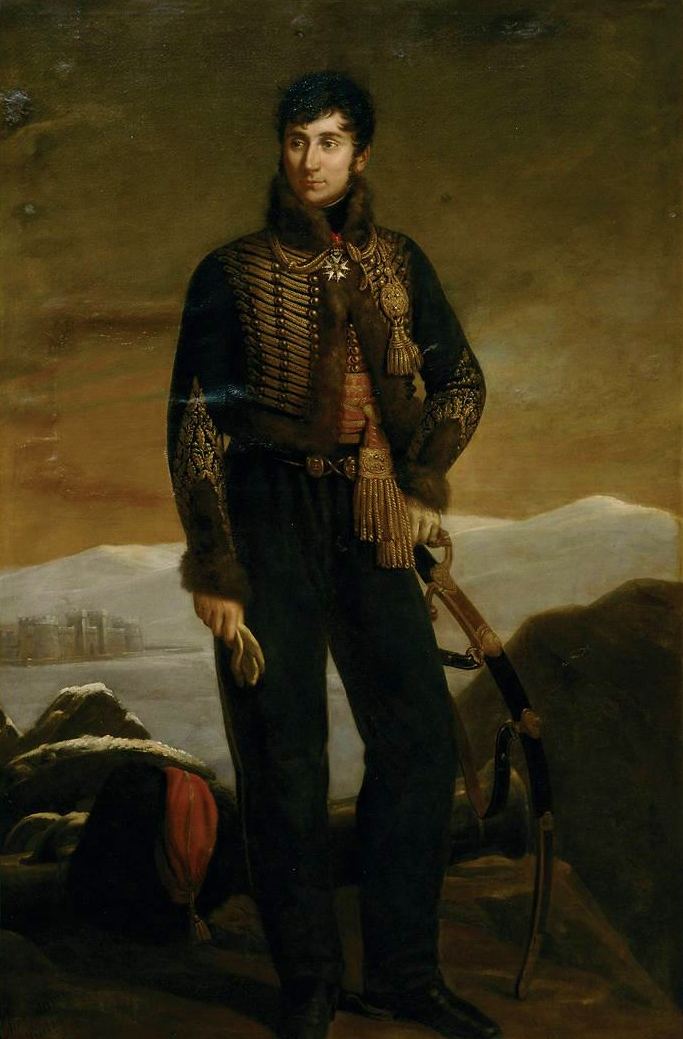
Jean-Jacques Desvaux de Saint-Maurice, in Guard horse artillery officer's uniform.

The Regime of the Horse Artillery of the Imperial Guard was created by imperial decree on 15 April 1806. It was organized into three squadrons, two of veterans and one of velites, each divided into two companies of 60 men, for a theoretical total of 360 artillerymen. The Guard's horse artillery underwent numerous changes, including the reduction of each company to 80 men, and was reshuffled several times, notably in 1808 when the 3rd squadron of velites was incorporated into the newly created Guard foot artillery regiment, reducing the strength to 320 artillerymen.

In May 1811, the Guard's horse artillery fielded 24 cannon. On 2 January 1813, two new companies were created, and this was ratified by imperial decree on April 8. At that date, the regiment had 36 artillery pieces. In 1814, a 7th company was added to the regiment, formed from Joseph Bonaparte's Spanish Royal Guard, which had returned to France after the battle of Vitoria.

Following the Emperor's abdication, the Guard artillery was disbanded by royal decree on 12 May 1814. The horse artillerymen were transferred to the line regiments.

The Guard's horse artillery was reformed in 1815 during the Hundred Days, with four companies. It was definitively disbanded on 7 November 1815, and most of its men were used to form the new artillery regiments of the Garde Royale.

The unit had its own surgeon, Surgeon-Major Therrin, who was promoted to Officer of the Legion of Honor on 9 July 1809.

== Military campaigns ==
=== First campaigns of the Empire ===
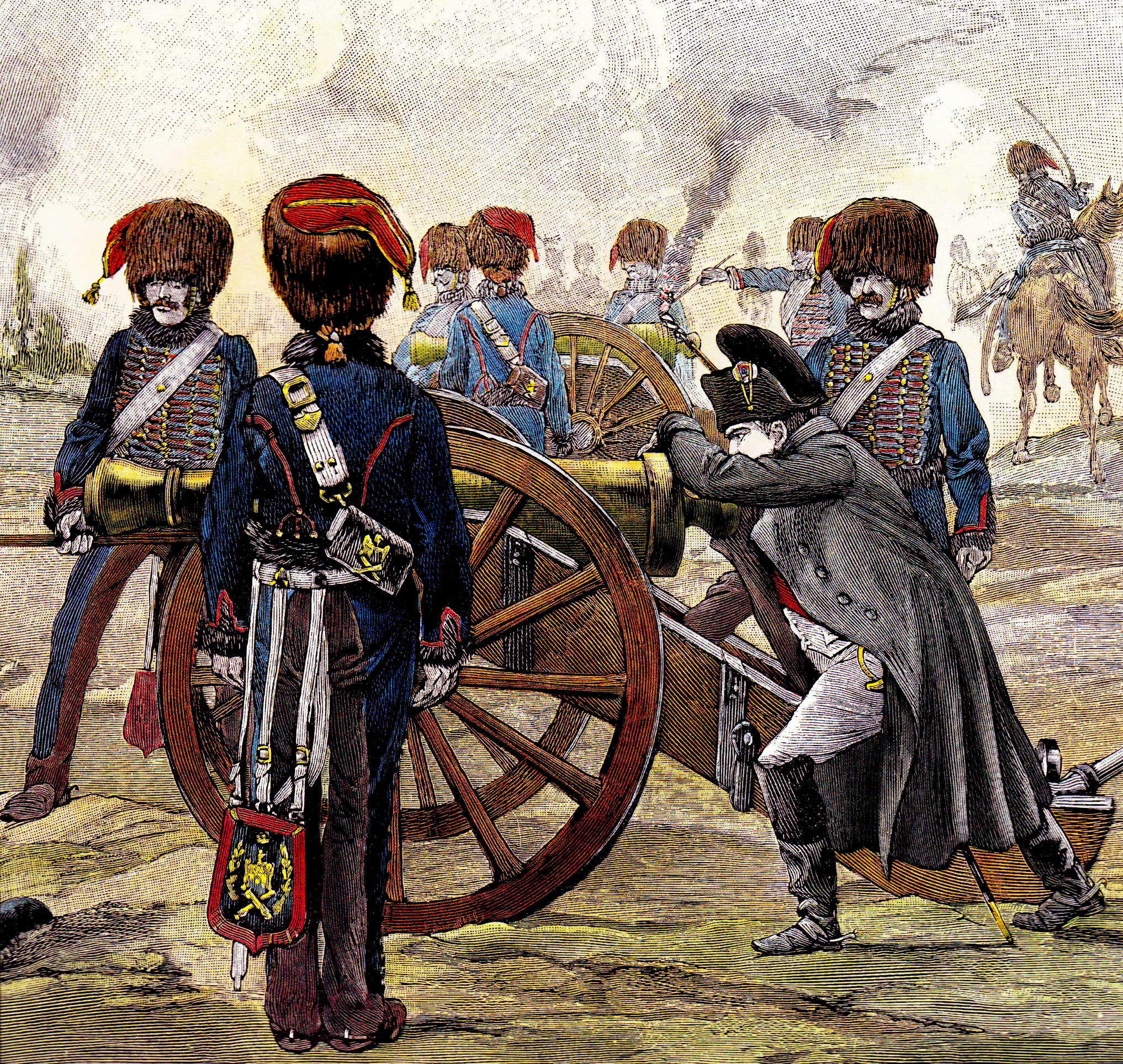
Napoleon checking the alignment of a cannon on the battlefield. Around him, the mounted artillerymen of the Imperial Guard prepare to fire the starter's pistol. Illustration by Job.

When they crossed the Rhine for the German campaign in September 1805, the Guard's horse artillerymen numbered 286 men. Under the command of Colonel Joseph Christophe Couin, they were present at the Battle of Austerlitz on December 2 of the same year, with a strength of 298 soldiers.

In 1806 and 1807, the Guard's horse artillerymen took part in the Prussian and Polish campaigns. At the Battle of Jena, they supported Marshal Ney's attack on Prussian positions. The enthusiastic Ney soon found himself in the middle of the enemy lines, and artillery support was decisive when Prussian general Hohenlohe decided to counter-attack with his entire cavalry.

The horse artillery once again distinguished itself at the Battle of Eylau, pounding the Russians under the command of General Lariboisière, head of the Imperial Guard Artillery. Throughout the day of 8 February 1807, it supported the center of the army with a 40-gun battery.

Mounted artillerymen also took part in the Battle of Friedland under the command of generals Lariboisière and Sénarmont. While General Latour-Maubourg's cavalry galloped forward to repel a Russian charge, a 30-gun battery was quickly deployed, inflicting heavy losses on the Russians.

=== Spanish Civil War ===
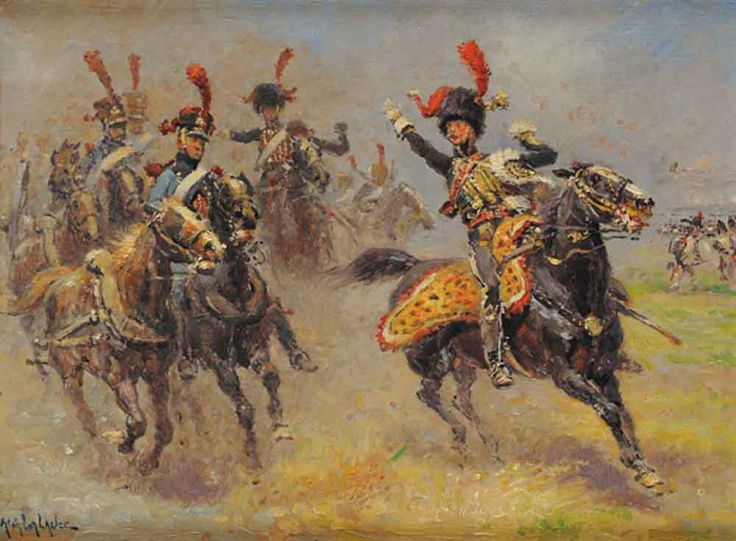
Imperial Guard horse artillery taking up position, by Alphonse Lalauze.

In 1808, Napoleon personally intervened in Spain at the head of the Grande Armée. The Guard's horse artillerymen took part in the capture of Madrid on December 3, where four of their officers were wounded. The unit bivouacs at Chamartin, on the outskirts of the capital. Lieutenant Bosc writes to his family: "The officers are housed with the soldiers in their quarters. There's not a single piece of furniture, no bed, no chair, no bench. We sleep on the floor. I like the bivouac where I am today about as much as this kind of accommodation. I don't need to tell you that we're not all comfortable in Spain".

On 6 January 1809, a two-piece convoy of Guards horse artillery commanded by Bosc was attacked by the Spaniards and had to withdraw, leaving three dead and two wounded.

=== Austrian Campaign ===
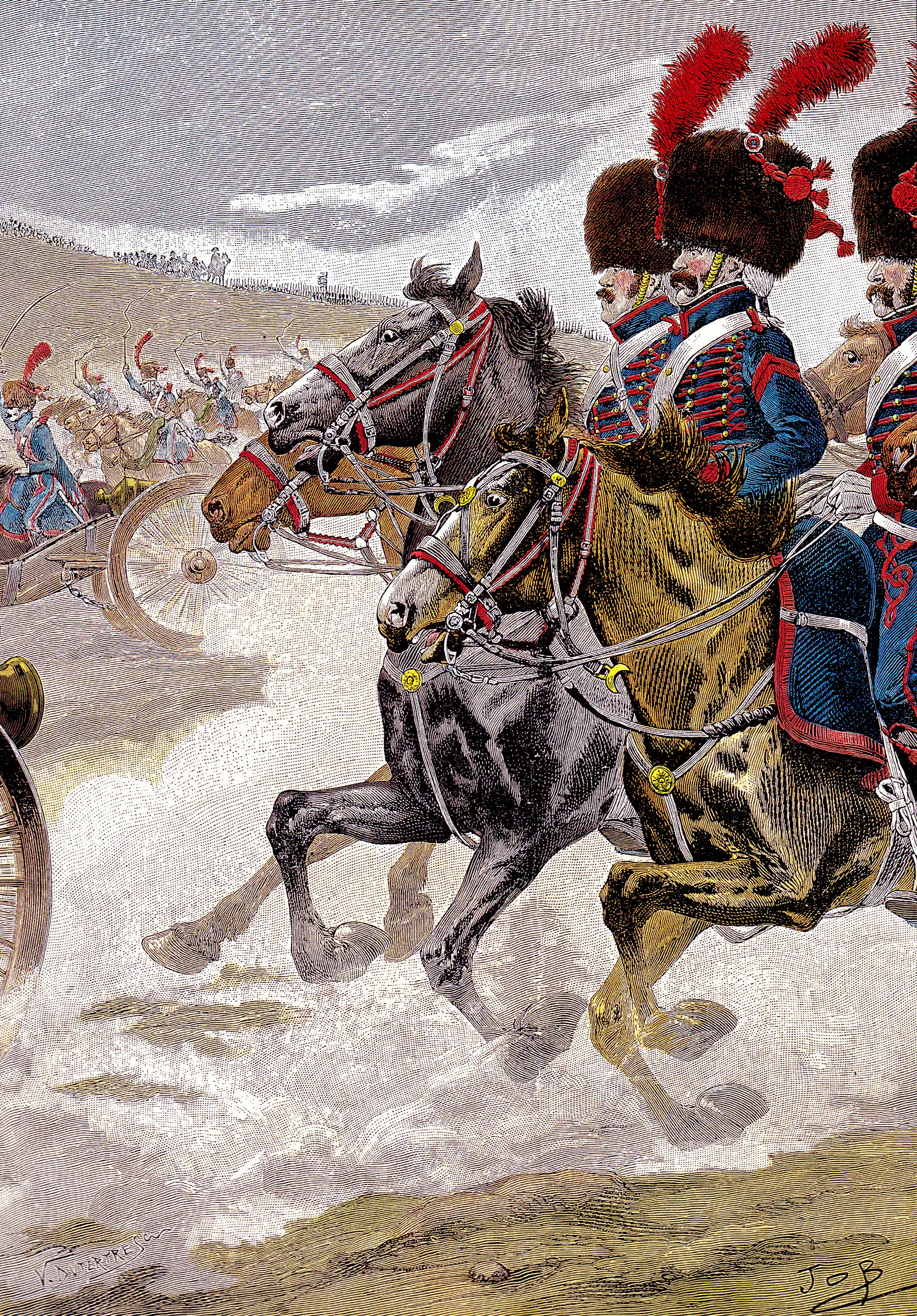
The Guard's horse artillery at Wagram, by Job.

The two artillery regiments of the Guard (horse artillery and foot artillery) were brought together under General Lauriston to take part in the Austrian campaign of 1809, notably at the Battle of Wagram, where the artillery played a decisive role in the French victory.

After Marshal Masséna's troops suffered heavy losses on the morning of 6 July 1809, and were forced to retreat, the Austrians decided to reinforce their wings, de facto weakening their centre. Napoleon then decided to use his artillery in the centre to prepare his counter-offensive, and ordered General Lauriston to concentrate all his batteries there. The Guard artillery deployed forty-eight guns, twenty-four of them mounted, and was soon joined by the line artillery for a total of one hundred guns on a 1,400-meter front. These combined efforts opened a breach in the Austrian centre, into which Macdonald's troops rushed, cutting the Austrian army in two and forcing Archduke Charles to retreat to Moravia with an army reduced by around 50,000 men. During the battle, the French artillery fired some 96,000 cannon shots and used around 250,000 pounds of gunpowder.

=== Russian campaign ===
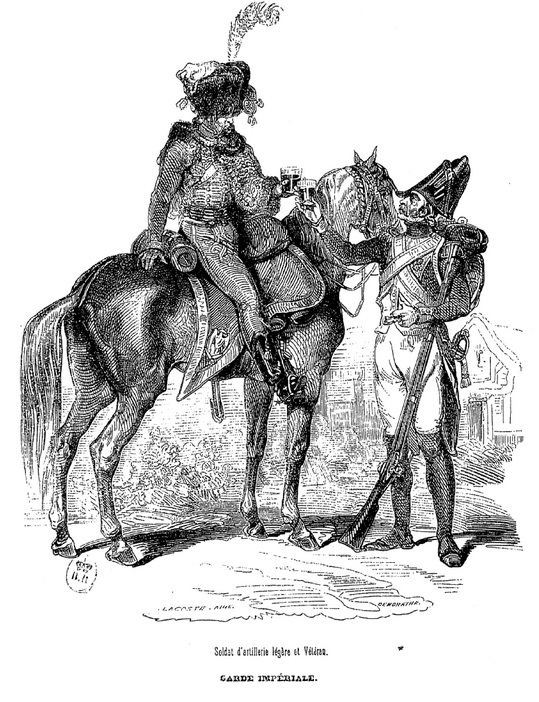
Mounted artilleryman and veteran, drawing by Lacoste.

The Guard's horse artillery also took part in the Russian campaign with General Grouchy's 3rd Cavalry Corps. It distinguished itself at the battles of Moskova and Berezina.

On 5 September 1812, the regiment witnessed the attack on Chevardino by General Compans, at the head of the 5th division of Davout's 1st corps, which sounded like a festive tune to Major Griois: "A superb sky and the setting sun reflected in the rifles and sabres added to the beauty of the spectacle. From their positions, the rest of the army followed these marching troops with their eyes, proud to be the first to be called to the honor of combat, and accompanied them with their cheers".

On the night of 6–7 September 1812, Griois moved his artillery pieces forward to join Eugène de Beauharnais' 4th Corps on the left flank, in preparation for the battle ahead. He had great difficulty crossing "the steep, muddy ravines that had to be crossed without a guide, sometimes in the deepest darkness, sometimes in the midst of bivouac fires that dazzled them and made them lose all direction". Artillery played a decisive role at Moskova, where no fewer than 60,000 cannon shots were fired by French and Allied artillerymen, according to an official report drawn up by General Lariboisière, the Grande Armée's inspector general of artillery. Based on 50,000 Russian cannon shots, this gives a figure of three cannon shots per second for the ten hours of battle.

=== Campaigns in Germany and France ===
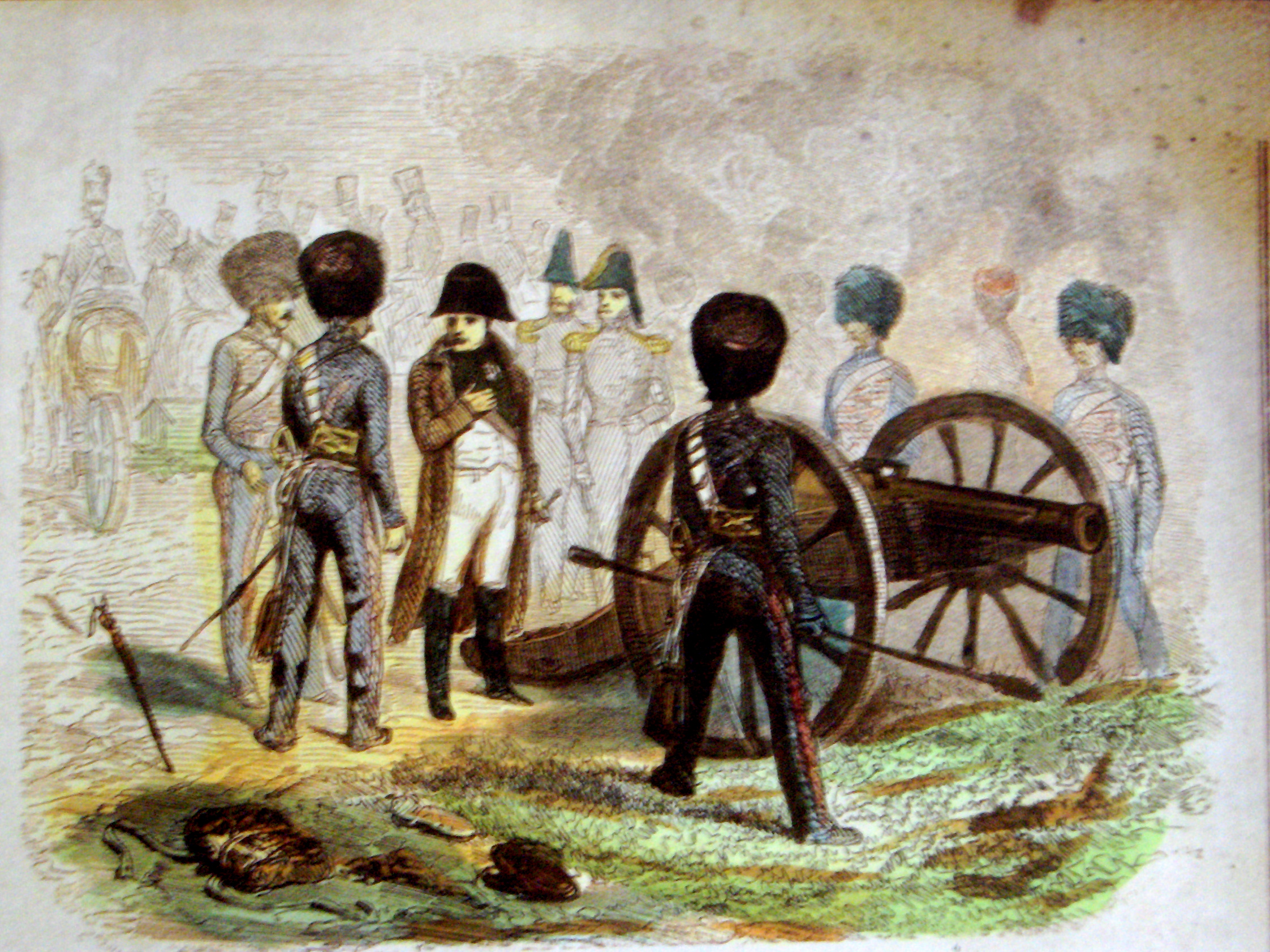
Napoleon giving instructions to the horse artillerymen of the Guard at the Battle of Montmirail.

The Guard's horse artillerymen again took an active part in the German campaign of 1813 and the French campaign of 1814.

On 11 February 1814, they took part in the Battle of Montmirail. Colonel Major Griois describes his regiment's engagement as follows: "Some distance ahead of the town, we encountered the enemy vanguard. It was supported by numerous Russian and Prussian troops, and soon the affair became general, particularly to the left, where I was with part of the artillery".

They also took part in the battle of Montereau on 18 February 1814. At around 7 a.m., the horse artillery set off for Villeneuve-les-Bordes with the rest of the Imperial Guard, where Napoleon was to join them. Around 4 p.m., after a cavalry charge by Generals Delort and Pajol, a large-caliber gun was installed, and had time to fire six shots at the coalition forces on the Saint-Maurice plain before they were out of range. Napoleon himself pointed one of the pieces from two batteries of horse artillery in the direction of the Fossard road.

=== Belgium Campaign ===
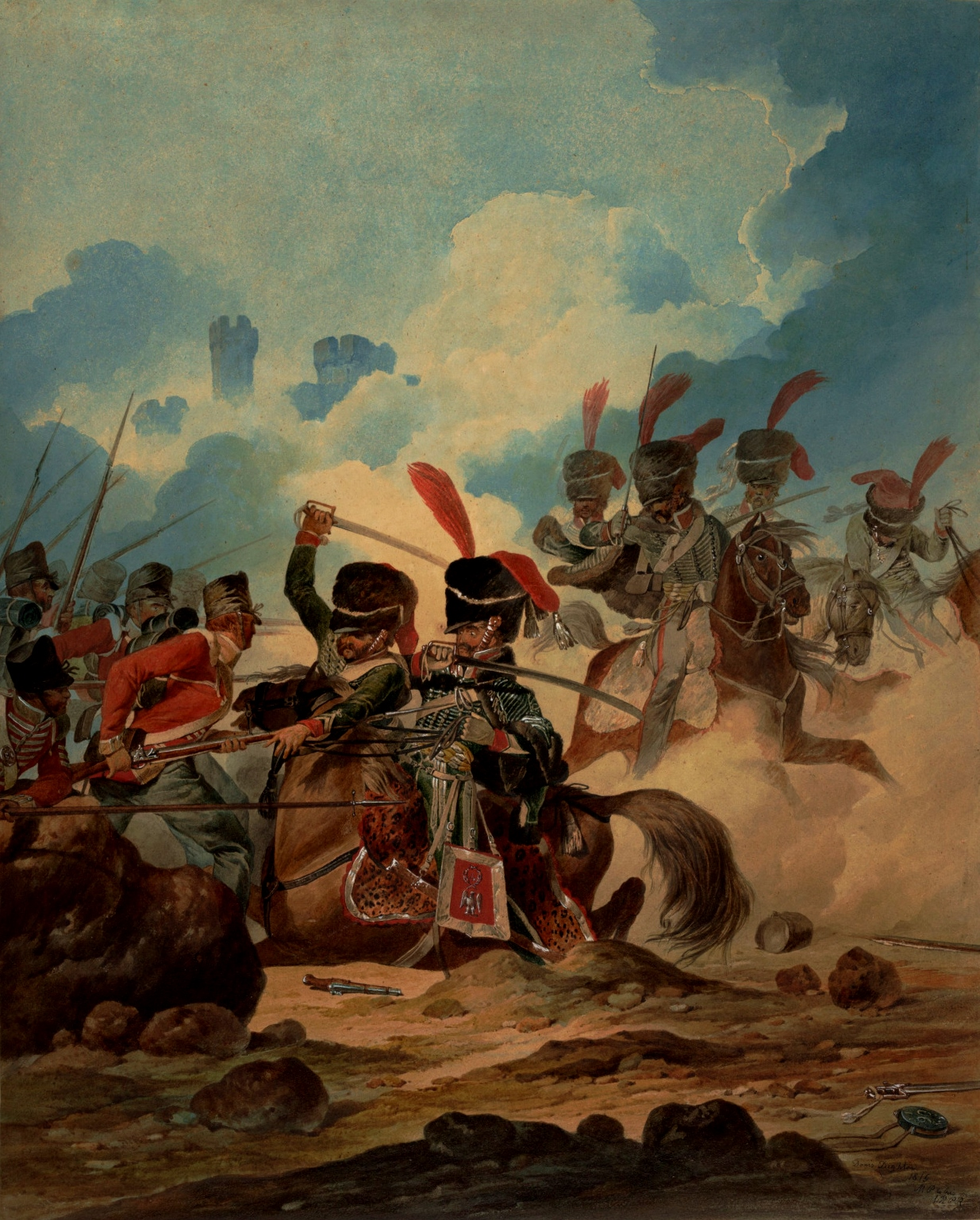
The horse artillery of the Imperial Guard grappling with British infantry at Waterloo. Watercolor by Denis Dighton, 1819. An officer is visible in the foreground. By mistake, the author shows the horsemen wearing visored collars.

Disbanded under the Restoration, the Guard's horse artillery was reconstituted in 1815 during the Hundred Days. During this period, it fought in the Belgian campaign at Ligny and Waterloo, under the command of generals Duchand de Sancey and Desvaux de Saint-Maurice, the latter being in charge of all the artillery of the Guard.

On 17 June 1815, Napoleon observed that the Quatre-Bras position so hotly contested the day before was now held only by Lord Uxbridge and the Duke of Wellington's rearguard, whose army had retreated in the direction of Brussels. The Emperor galloped there with the horse artillery of the Guard, which he had batteryed to cannonade the allied rearguard. Six artillery pieces marched to the front in pursuit of the retreating enemy, alongside Napoleon, who led the column on a small, very light Arabian horse. The Emperor is constantly with the guns, exalting the horse artillerymen of the Guard by his presence and his words, and more than once amid cannonballs and shells, he shouts to them with an accent of hatred: "Shoot! Shoot them! They're English!".

The following day, the horse artillerymen took part in the Battle of Waterloo. At around 5:30 pm, Napoleon detached two batteries to the left of the Haye Sainte farm, inflicting severe losses on the enemy. Nevertheless, with no cavalry or infantry support, no decisive results were obtained from two hours of deadly exchanges of shells and cannonballs. At around 7:30 p.m., the Guard's horse artillery took part with four batteries in the attack on the Imperial Guard on the Mont-Saint-Jean plateau. Before the fighting was over, General Desvaux de Saint-Maurice was killed by a cannonball.

After this final feat of arms, the unit was definitively disbanded following Napoleon's abdication and the return of the Bourbons.

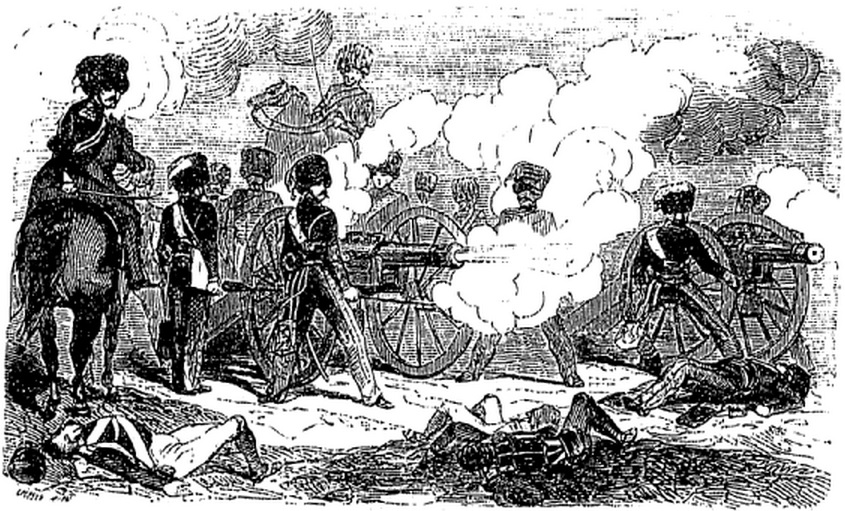
Guards horse artillery cannonading enemy positions.

== Uniforms and equipment ==
=== Troops and non-commissioned officers ===
==== Full dress (Figure 1) ====
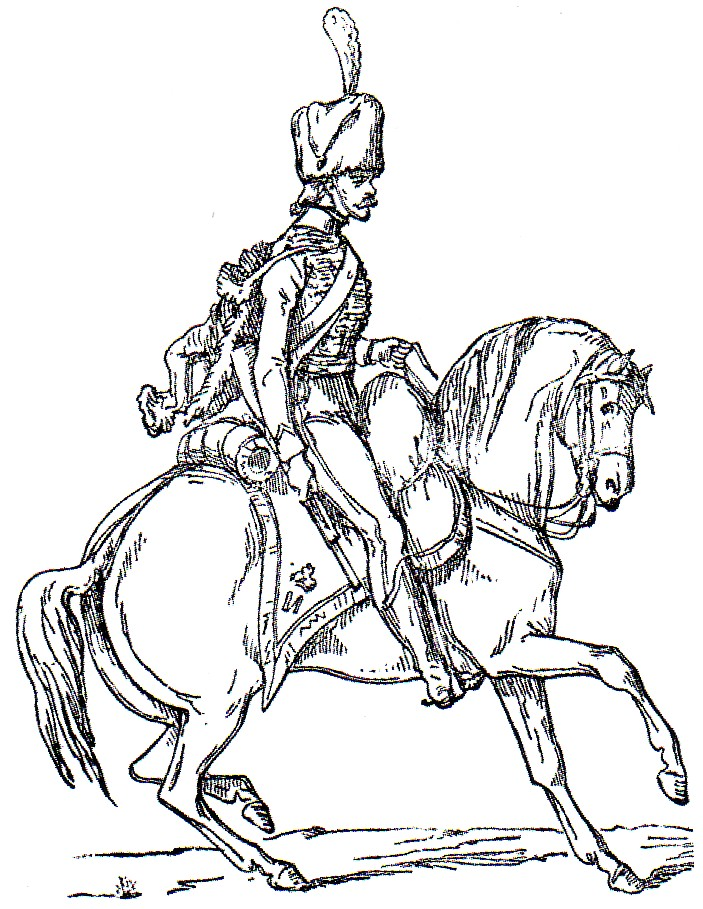
Guard mounted artilleryman in full regalia, drawing by Adolphe de Chesnel.

Guards mounted artillerymen wear hussar-style uniforms, with dolman and pelisse, trimmed in black fur, "imperial blue" with scarlet brandebourgs. The collar of the dolman is blue, edged in red, and the "pointed" facings are red. The wool belt is scarlet with yellow cords. The buttons are all yellow. The breeches are blue with red Hungarian knots. Light cavalry "Hungarian-style" boots are black with red ornamentation.

The headdress consists of a black colback with cords and chinstraps, topped with a vermilion plumeet and a tricolor cockade. The whole is decorated with red snowshoes and a red flam.

The buffleteries are white and the giberne is black. Riders also wear the blue sabretache with red ornaments and aurora, with an embroidered imperial eagle in the center (in copper from 1811).

During the Hundred Days, no Hungarian-style outfits were made for the troop, which also wore neither sabretaches, nor colback flames nor plumes, the latter having most likely, according to Pierre Juhel, been "left in store when the horse artillery left for the campaign, following the example of other Guard troops for which the fact is mentioned".

==== Lightweight handling and roadholding ====
The small uniform of the mounted artillerymen is similar to that of the mounted chasseurs of the Imperial Guard, but in blue. The jacket (frac) is long, red-trimmed and stamped with the imperial eagle. The pointed lapel and straight collar are piped in red. It is worn over a blue vest. A red fourragère is worn on the left shoulder. Pants and boots are those of the grande tenue, but the charivari, reinforced with black leather basanes on the inside from the crotch and with underfoot, is also worn. Nankin pants can also be worn in summer. The bicorne can be worn with this outfit.

The "tenue de route" is a sober version of the "grande tenue", without the pelisse - which can, however, be "chaussée" (slipped over the dolman) in bad weather - and without the plumeet of the colback, or of the "petite tenue", worn with the charivari. The artillerymen are equipped with the cavalry's ample "rotunda coat" for bad weather (see figure 3).

Non-commissioned officers' uniforms differed little from those of the troops. However, there are gold rank braids above the facing. A red and yellow fourragère is worn with the petite tenue.

==== Arming ====
Armament consists of a light cavalry-style curved steel saber with a copper guard (see figure 5) and an An XIII cavalry pistol (see figure 6), as the artillerymen have no musket.

=== Officers (Figures 2, 3 and 4) ===
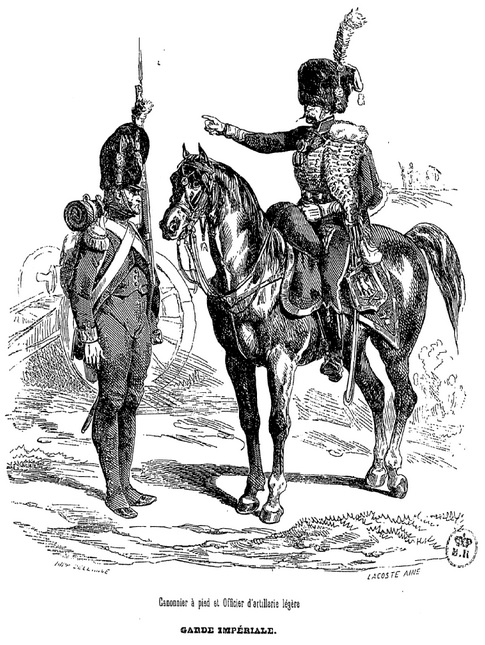
Foot gunner and mounted artillery officer, drawing by Lacoste.

Officers' uniforms and dress uniforms are in the same style as those of the troops, but with a more attractive cut (Guards officers regularly had their uniforms made by private tailors) and a more sparkling look. All embellishments (collar cords and snowshoes, brandebourgs, Hungarian knots and other trimmings, small garment furs) are gold, as are the boot trimmings. The pelisse is trimmed with white fur. The sabretaches are brighter than those of the troop, red with gold trim and braid (see figures 2 and 8). The giberne band is red with gold braid and trim.

Officers are generally armed with "fancy" light cavalry sabers, with elaborate guards (see figure 7) and richly decorated scabbards.

=== Trumpets (Figure 4) ===
As was customary in the mounted troops of Napoleonic armies, trumpeters wore a distinctly more colorful uniform than that of the ranks. Like those of the officers, the trumpets' large and small uniforms are of the same cut as those of the troop, but sky-blue in color, with the flame and plume of the colback, and the saddle blanket and portmanteau of the same color. The colback is white and, as with the officers, all the trimmings and fittings on the large uniform are gold. The pelisse is red, trimmed with white fur, and the sabretache has a sky-blue background and gold trim.

Uniforms

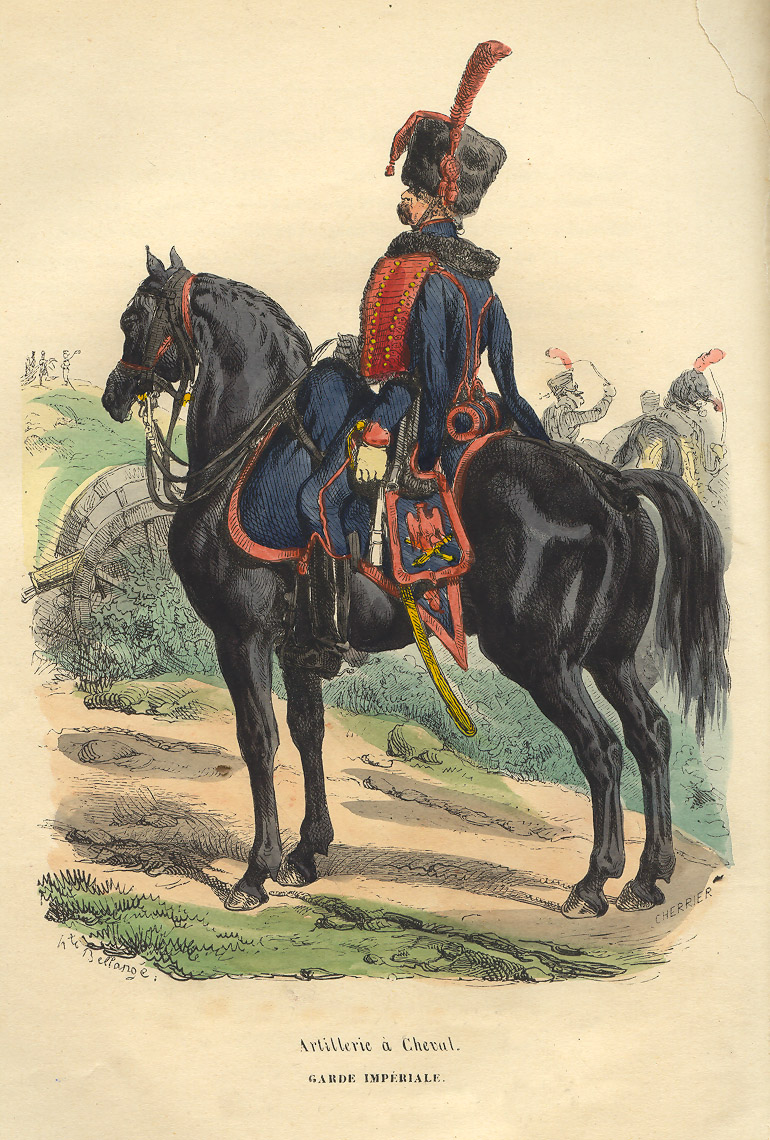
Figure 1: Gunner by Hippolyte Bellangé.

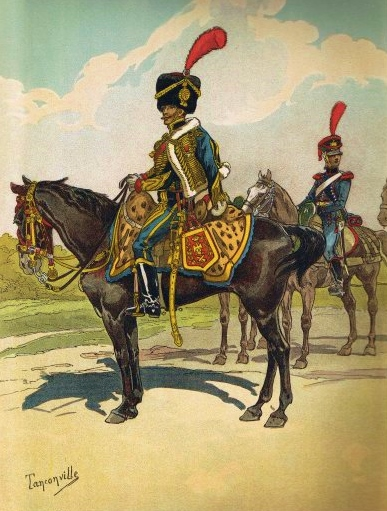
Figure 2: Officer by Tanconville. In the background, a postilion of the Garde artillery train.

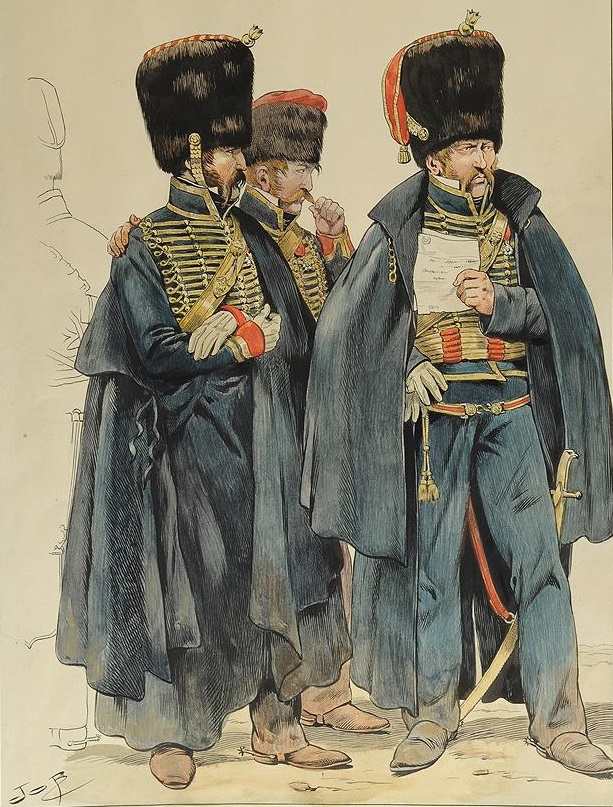
Figure 3: Artillery officers in full regalia, illustration by Job. They are wearing the rotunda coat and charivari trousers of the cavalry.

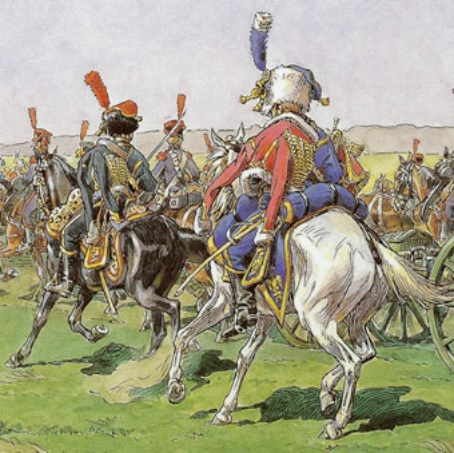
Figure 4: Officer and trumpet, drawing by Victor Huen.
Armament and equipment

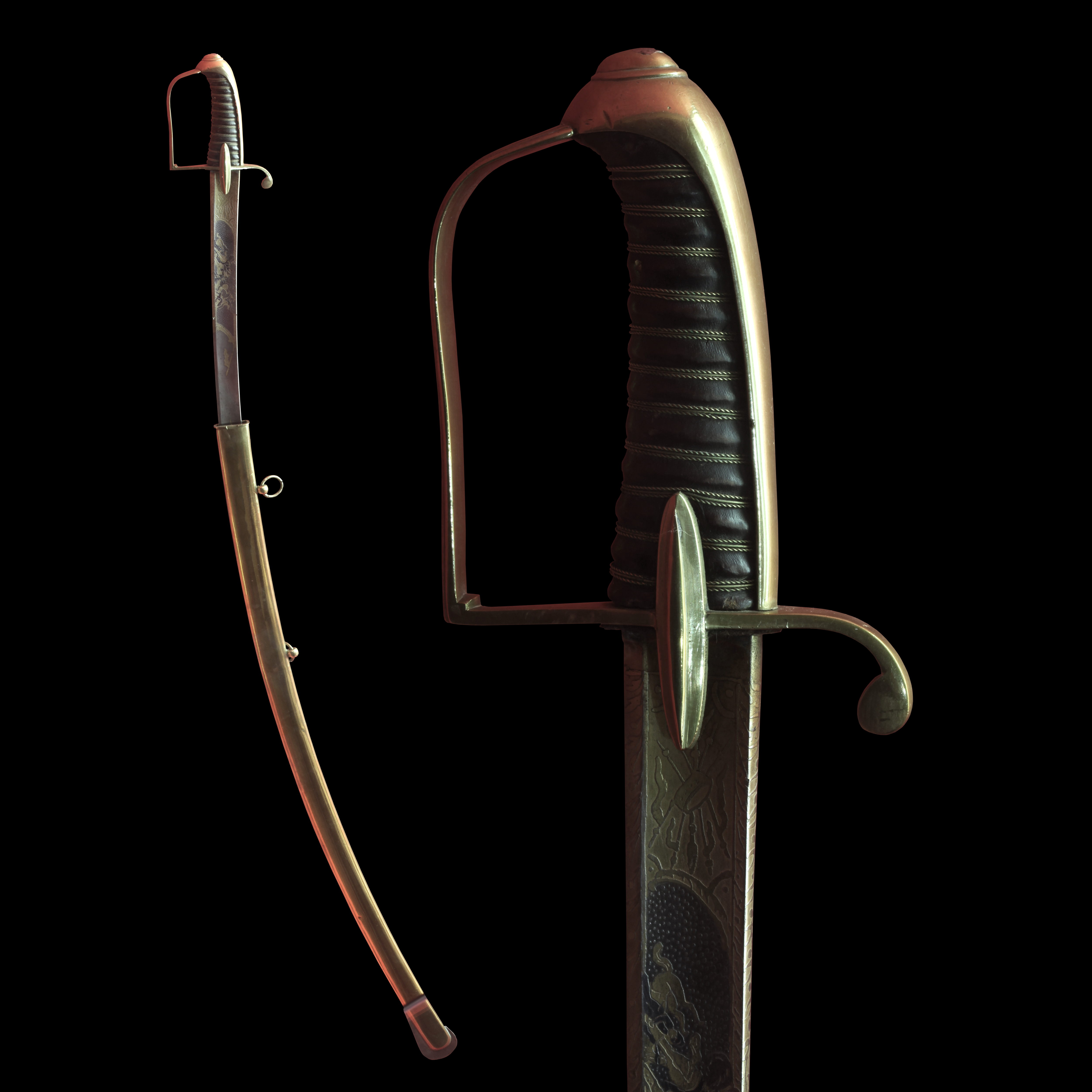
Figure 5: light cavalry saber under the Consulate and Empire.

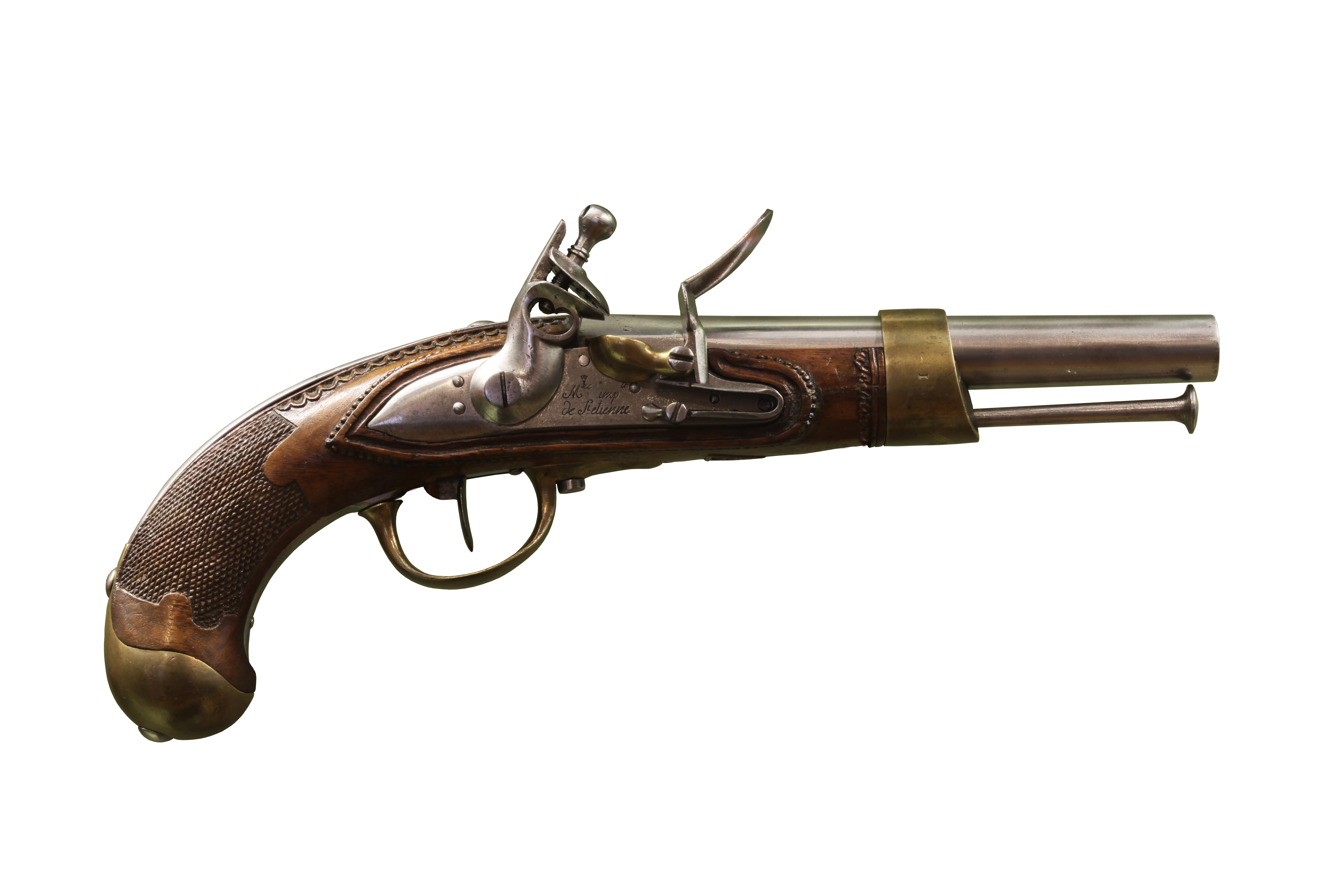
Figure 6: An XIII cavalry pistol.

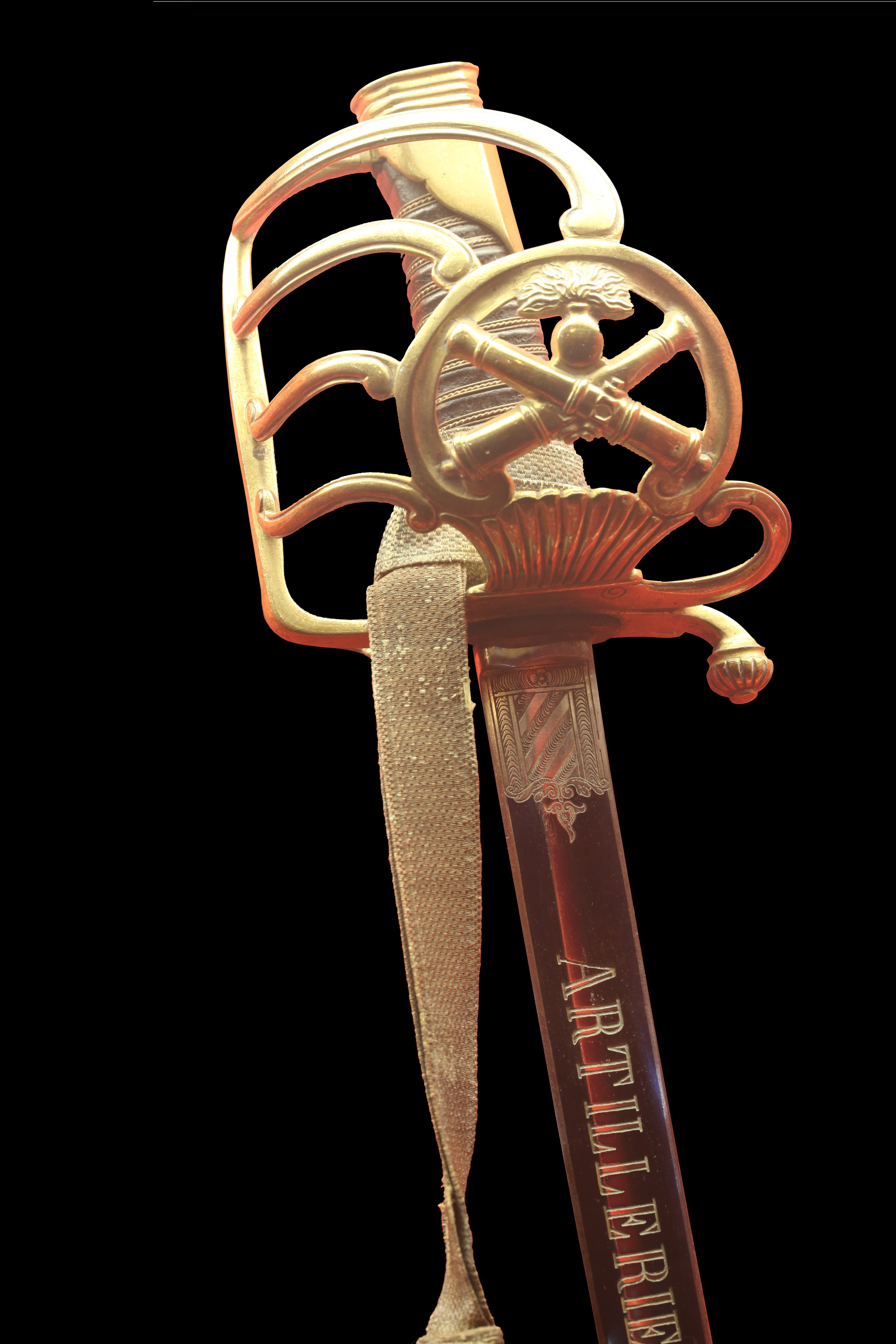
Figure 7: Imperial Guard horse artillery saber on display at the Musée d'art et d'histoire de Neuchâtel.

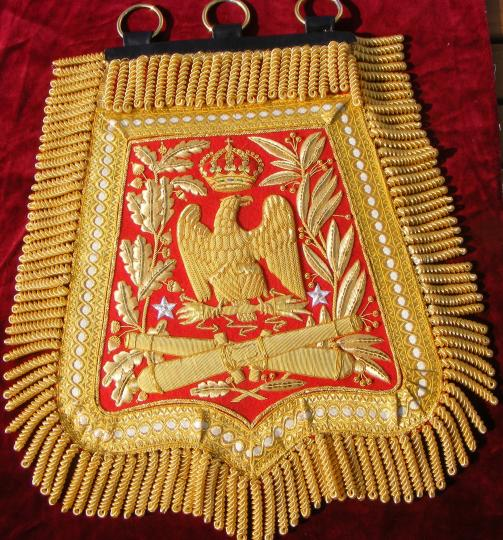
Figure 8: General Desvaux de Saint-Mauriece's sabretache.

=== Horses and tack ===
The saddle consisted of a white and red chabraque, with a blue portmanteau with red braids, but other 19th-century military painters and illustrators, such as Édouard Detaille and Hippolyte Bellangé, depicted horses covered with a blue saddlecloth, braided in red and decorated with the imperial eagle in the points covering the hindquarters (see figure 1). Officers wore "fancy" panther-skin chabraques embellished with yellow braid edged in red and festooned in red, blue or gold (see figures 2 and 4). Harness, stirrup leathers and reins are made of black leather for the troops, studded or embellished with gilded copper parts for the officers.

== Heads of corps ==
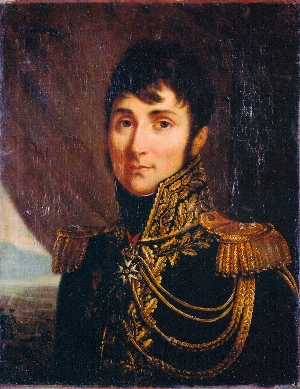
Jean-Jacques Desvaux de Saint-Maurice (1775–1815), last commander of the Imperial Guard artillery, killed at the Battle of Waterloo. Oil on canvas, 19th century.

Louis Doguereau was appointed major when the regiment was created in 1806. On 13 September 1808, Augustin Marie d'Aboville became major of the Garde horse artillery. He stood out at the Battle of Wagram, where his right arm was blown off by a cannonball. As a reward, he was promoted to brigadier general on 9 July 1809, made a baron of the Empire and appointed commandant of the La Fère artillery school. Six days later, Jean-Jacques Desvaux de Saint-Maurice was appointed major of the regiment. On 6 November 1813, Charles Pierre Lubin Griois became major of the regiment, a position he held until the Guard artillery was disbanded on 12 May 1814.

During the Hundred Days, Jean-Baptiste Duchand de Sancey was appointed colonel-general of the regiment, and Desvaux de Saint-Maurice was put in charge of the entire artillery of the Guard. During the Battle of Waterloo, the former rushed to within rifle range of a Scottish square with six cannons, prompting Napoleon to declare: "Doesn't it look like Duchand is deserting?". The latter was hit by a cannonball during the battle and died instantly.

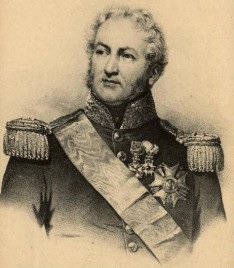
Louis Doguereau (1777–1856)

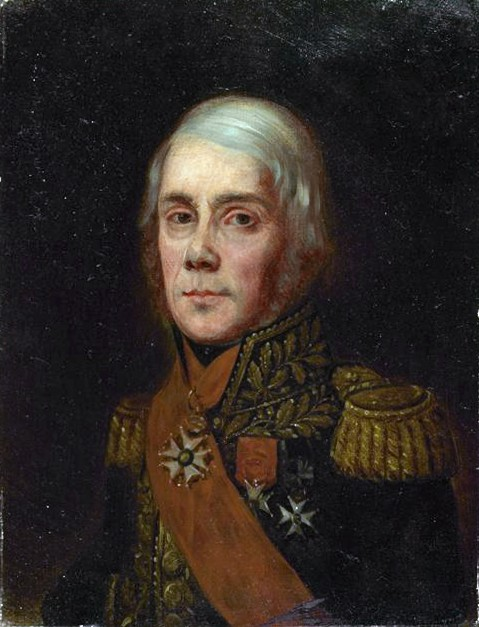
Augustin Marie d'Aboville (1776–1843), oil on canvas, 19th century.

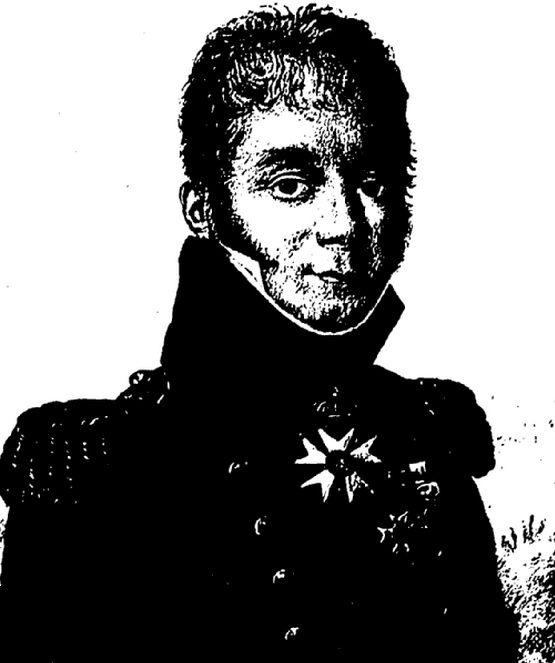
Charles Pierre Lubin Griois (1772–1839)

== See also ==
- Imperial Guard Artillery (First empire)
- Horse artillery
- Lancers of the Imperial Guard

== Notes and references ==
=== Bibliography ===
- Petit journal de l'exposition "Napoléon, l'histoire et la légende" : Bicentenaire de Wagram 1809-2009. Draguignan: Musée de l'artillerie. 2009. p. 8.
- Bienvenu, Jacques (1964). La Bataille de Montereau. Draguignan: Impr. du Progrès. p. 24.
- Blin, Arnaud (2003). Iéna : Octobre 1806. Paris: Perrin. p. 8. ISBN 978-2-262-01751-4.
- Bosc, Julien (2011). Lettres du Capitaine Bosc (1807–1809), Compilation, présentation et commentaires par Diégo Mané, d'après des documents communiqués par Jean-Luc Marie. p. 13.
- Boudon, Jacques-Olivier (2014). Napoléon et la campagne de France : 1814. p. 368.
- Cate, Curtis (2012). La campagne de Russie : 22 juin - 14 décembre 1812. Paris: Tallandier. ISBN 978-2-84734-928-3.
- Lubin Griois, Charles Pierre (1909). Mémoires du général Griois. Paris: Plon-Nourrit.
- Jouineau, André (2006). The French Imperial Guard : Cavalry and Horse Artillery (1804–1815). Vol. 4. Amber Books Limited. ISBN 978-2-35250-002-5.
- Juhel, Pierre (2009). De l'île d'Elbe à Waterloo : la Garde impériale pendant les Cent-Jours. Annecy-le-Vieux: Éditions de la Revue Napoléon. ISBN 978-2-9524583-3-7.
- Lievyns, A.; Verdot, Jean Maurice; Bégat, Pierre (1844). Fastes de la Légion d'honneur : biographie de tous les décorés accompagnée de l'histoire législative et réglementaire de l'ordre. Vol. 3. Bureau de l'administration.
- Mané, Diégo (2014). Les régiments d'artillerie de la Garde impériale sous le Premier Empire (1804–1815). Lyon.
- de Saint-Hilaire, Émile Marco (1847). Histoire anecdotique, politique et militaire de la Garde impériale. Paris: E. Penaud. OCLC 7044648.
- Mullié, Charles (1852). Biographie des célébrités militaires des armées de terre et de mer de 1789 à 1850.
- de Pontécoulant, Gustave (1866). Souvenirs militaires. Napoléon à Waterloo, ou précis rectifié de la campagne de 1815. Paris: J. Dumaine.
- Rousselot, Lucien (1958). Artillerie à cheval de la Garde : 1800–1815.
- Rousselot, Lucien (1980). Artillerie à cheval de la Garde : officiers et trompettes : 1800–1815.
- Sokolov, Oleg (2006). Austerlitz : Napoléon, l'Europe et la Russie. Translated by Kahn, Michèle. Saint-Germain-en-Laye: Commios. ISBN 2-9518364-3-0.
- Viton de Saint-Allais, Nicolas (1811). Histoire générale des ordres de chevalerie, civils et militaires, existant en Europe. p. 135.

=== Notes ===
1. During the battle, Napoleon himself aimed one of the Guard's horse artillery pieces. As several artillerymen were killed alongside him, and his staff implored him to withdraw, the Emperor replied: "Come, my friends, the cannonball that is to kill me has not yet melted! Another version says that, as Napoleon was reviewing the grenadiers of the Guard during the Battle of Arcis-sur-Aube, a cannonball rolled past him. Pushing his horse onto the explosive, it burst and Napoleon rolled to the ground. Rising unscathed, he is said to have uttered his famous phrase...
2. Gustave de Pontécoulant places General Desvaux de Saint-Maurice's death at around 4 p.m. (see de Pontécoulant 1866, p. 301).
3. This detail is repeated by many contemporary uniformologists: see external links.
