= Imperial Guard Artillery =

Imperial Guard Artillery (First Empire)

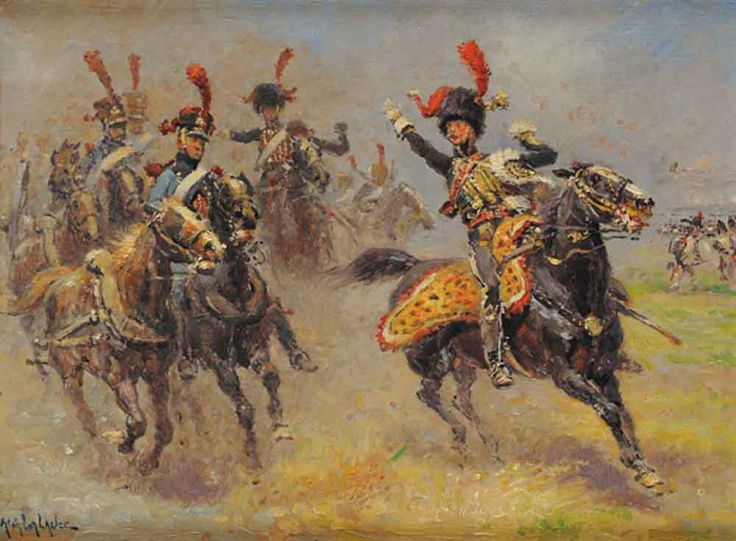
- Imperial Guard horse artillery taking up position, by Alphonse Lalauze. On the right, an officer in full "hussard" regalia, on the left, postilions of the train.
- Active: 1806-1815
- Country: France
- Allegiance: First French Empire
- Branch: Imperial Guard (Napoleon I)
- Type: Horse regiment, Foot regiment, Artillery train
- Role: Artillery
- Engagements: Napoleonic Wars

Commanders
- Current commander: Jean Ambroise Baston de Lariboisière, Joseph Christophe Couin, Jean-Barthélemot Sorbier, Charles François Dulauloy, Jean-Jacques Desvaux de Saint-Maurice

The Imperial Guard Artillery was made up of the organic units of the Imperial Guard of Napoleon I. It comprised a regiment of horse artillery, regiments of foot artillery and a train service responsible for supplying guns with powder and ammunition.

From its creation until 1813, the Guard artillery was commanded by Marshal of the Empire, Édouard Mortier, Duke of Treviso, and from November 1813, by Marshal Louis-Gabriel Suchet, Duke d'Albuféra.

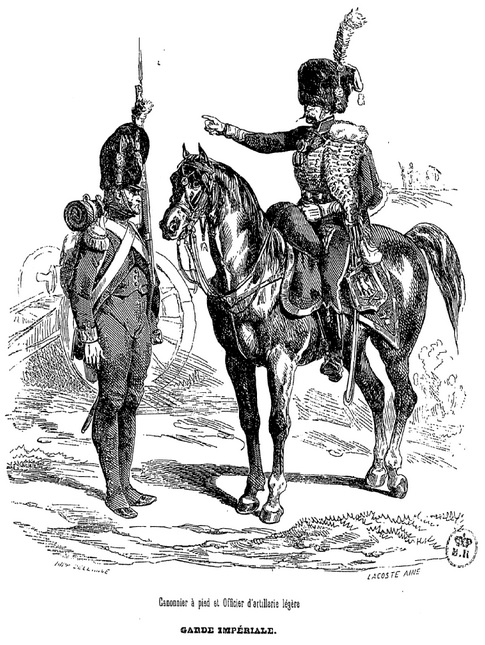
Foot gunner and mounted artillery officer, drawing by Lacoste.

== Consular Guard ==
The Consular Guard or Garde consulaire was created by Bonaparte on November 28, 1799, through the amalgamation of various units charged with protecting republican institutions and bodies. It was an "inter-army" corps made up of infantry, cavalry and artillery - in this case, a mounted artillery company of around 100 men drawn from the guides to which it was attached.

In Year XII, the artillery of the Garde Consulaire, under the command of Brigadier General Nicolas-Marie Songis des Courbons, included a squadron under Colonel Joseph Christophe Couin, a train under Captain Edmé Devarenne and a park.

== The Imperial Guard ==
By decree dated Floréal 28, Year XII (May 18, 1804), the former horse artillery company of the Garde Consulaire became the horse artillery regiment of the Imperial Guard, retaining its inter-army character but with considerably increased numbers. Couin remained its artillery commander until he was replaced in 1807 by Jean Ambroise Baston de Lariboisière.

=== Horse artillery ===
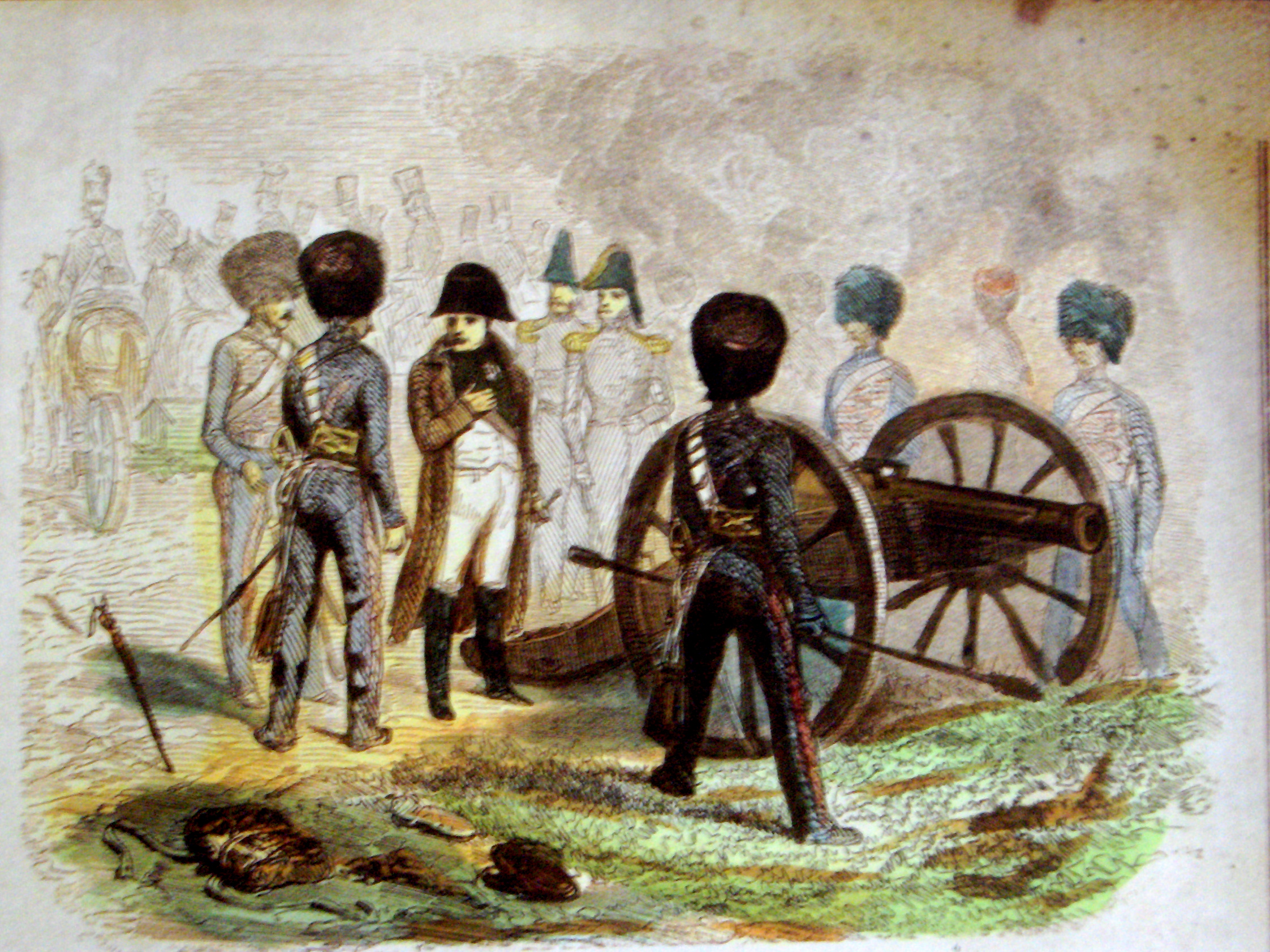
Napoleon giving instructions to the horse artillerymen of the Guard at the Battle of Montmirail.

Heir to the compagnie d'artillerie à cheval de la Garde consulaire, the Horse Artillery of the Imperial Guard was considered the elite of Napoleon's artillery, and took part in all the campaigns and battles of the Empire's Wars. At the Battle of Wagram, the Garde's horse artillery suffered far more casualties than the foot artillery. Decimated during the retreat from Russia, it was quickly reconstituted. Finally, during the final phase of the Battle of Waterloo, the last major battle of the Napoleonic Wars, the horse artillery took part with four batteries in the attack of the Imperial Guard on the Mont-Saint-Jean plateau.

Trained as an artilleryman, Napoleon placed himself at the head of his guns on several occasions. During the French campaign of 1814, he personally directed the firing of the batteries at the battle of Montmirail and then Montereau. On June 17, 1815, after the Battle of Quatre Bras, he personally led the mounted batteries in pursuit of the British troops retreating to Brussels.

=== Dismounted artillery ===
By imperial decree of April 17, 1808, four companies of foot artillery were incorporated into the artillery of the Guard. These were increased to eight in 1810, and to nine in 1812, all organized into a regiment. On October 11, 1811, Napoleon defined the regiment as part of the Old Guard.

The following year, a second regiment was created and attached to the Jeune Garde (Young Guard).

On May 13, 1814, after the Treaty of Fontainebleau and Napoleon I's first abdication, the foot artillery of the Imperial Guard was disbanded, but on April 1, 1815, after Napoleon I's return, the foot artillery regiment of the Imperial Guard was reconstituted, albeit with only six companies.

It took part in the Belgian campaign, and was present at the battles of Ligny and Waterloo. On July 16, 1815, following Napoleon I's second abdication, the regiment was definitively disbanded. It was replaced by the foot artillery regiment of the Royal Guard during the Bourbon Restoration in France (Second Restoration), under royal orders dated September 1 and 14, 1815.

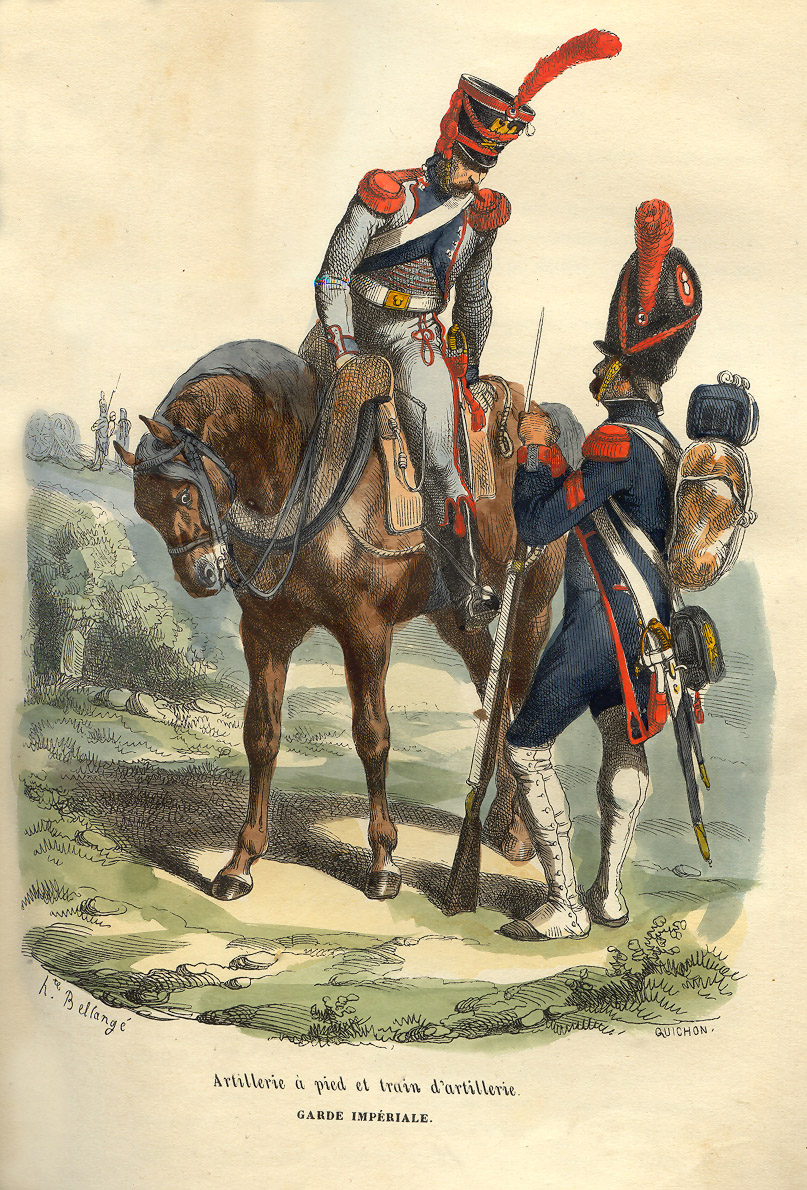
Foot artilleryman and Guards artillery train after Hippolyte Bellangé.

To be admitted to this elite corps, one had to be a graduate of the artillerie de ligne, have six years' service and be 5 ft 5 in (1.65 m) tall

=== Train ===
The artillery train comprised six companies forming a battalion in 1806. This was increased to eight companies in 1812. During the Hundred Days, the train was reorganized into a squadron of eight companies.

== Equipment ==
Since the late 1770s, French artillery had been organized according to the system developed by Jean-Baptiste Vaquette de Gribeauval. In 1803, following studies carried out by the "Artillery Committee", which he had set up on December 29, 1801 and chaired by General François Marie d'Aboville, Napoleon decided to simplify the Gribeauval system by limiting the number of calibres used.

=== Horse artillery ===
In 1815, the horse artillery fielded four companies, each equipped with four six-pounders and two howitzers.

== Command ==
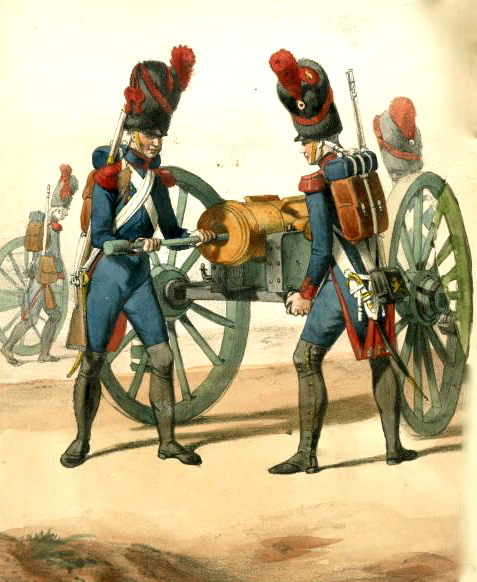
Foot gunners serving a 12-pound gun.

=== Colonel general ===
The Colonel General of the artillery and sailors was Marshal Édouard Mortier, Duke of Treviso, and from November 1813, General Louis-Gabriel Suchet, Duc d'Albuféra.

=== Colonel commanders and major commanders ===
The Guard artillery was placed under the command of a division general, who held the title of colonel commandant; the horse artillery, the foot artillery of the Old Guard (created in 1808), the Young Guard (Jeune Garde, created in 1813) and the artillery train regiment were each placed under the command of a brigadier general (or colonel), who held the title of major commandant.

On March 9, 1806, Colonel Joseph Christophe Couin was promoted to brigadier general commanding the Guard artillery. On January 3, 1807, he was promoted to second colonel, with Jean Ambroise Baston de Lariboisière, made division general the same day by the Emperor, replacing him in command of the corps. In 1811, General Jean-Barthélemot Sorbier succeeded Lariboisière.

On December 15, 1808, Antoine Drouot was appointed by the Emperor to command the foot artillery regiment, which he reorganized the following year.

In 1813, the artillery of the Guard was commanded by Major General Charles François Dulauloy (who replaced de Sorbier); the horse artillery by Brigadier General Jean-Jacques Desvaux de Saint-Maurice; the foot artillery of the Old Guard by Colonel Charles Pierre Lubin Griois; the foot artillery of the Young Guard by Colonel Christophe Henrion; and the train regiment by Colonel Henri-Antoine Bon de Lignim.

During the Belgian campaign of 1815, the artillery of the Guard was under the command of General Desvaux, who was killed during the Battle of Waterloo; the horse artillery was under the command of Jean-Baptiste Duchand de Sancey, and the foot artillery was under the command of Henri Dominique Lallemand.

== Battles and officer losses ==
- May 22, 1809: Essling - battalion commander Boulard and 1 officer wounded
- July 6, 1809: Wagram - 1 officer killed, 1 officer mortally wounded and 6 others wounded - colonel Drouot and battalion chief Boulard were wounded
- September 5, 1812: Battle of Schewardino - 2 officers wounded
- September 7, 1812: Borodino - 1 officer killed, 1 mortally wounded and 8 others wounded
- November 16 and 17, 1812: Krasnoye - 3 officers mortally wounded and 1 other wounded
- November 28, 1812: Berezina - 2 officers wounded
- December 9–10 - 11, 1812: Vilna - 3 officers mortally wounded
- May 2, 1813: Lützen - 2 officers killed and 1 wounded
- May 11, 1813: Elbe crossing - battalion commander D'Hautpoul wounded
- August 26, 1813: Dresden - 1 officer wounded
- October 16, 1813: Leipzig - 2 officers killed, 2 officers mortally wounded and 2 others wounded
- January 24, 1814: Bar-sur-Aube - 1 officer wounded
- February 1, 1814: La Rothière - 1 officer wounded
- February 11, 1814: Montmirail - 2 officers wounded
- March 7, 1814: Craonne - 2 officers wounded
- March 13, 1814: Capture of Reims - 1 officer wounded
- March 30, 1814: Paris - 1 officer mortally wounded and 4 others wounded
- June 18, 1815: Waterloo - 1 officer killed, 2 officers mortally wounded and 5 others wounded - battalion commander Raoul is wounded

== Bibliography ==
- Boudon, Jacques-Olivier (2014). Napoléon et la campagne de France : 1814 (published 368).
- Funcken, Liliane; Funcken, Fred (1969). Les uniformes et les armes des soldats du Premier Empire : de la garde impériale aux troupes alliées, suédoises, autrichiennes et russes. Vol. 2. Casterman. ISBN 978-2-203-14306-7.
- Lachouque, Henry (1972). Waterloo 1815. Éditions Stock.
- Mané, Diégo (2014). Les régiments d'artillerie de la Garde impériale sous le Premier Empire (1804-1815) (in French). Lyon: doczz.fr.
- Palasne de Champeaux, Antoine Julien Pierre (1804). État militaire de la République française pour l'an douze.
- Smith, Digby (2000). Napoleon's Regiments, Greenhill Books, 2000. Greenhill Books.

== See also ==
- Lancers of the Imperial Guard
- Horse Artillery of the Imperial Guard
