= Sabretache =

Flat bag of cavalry soldiers

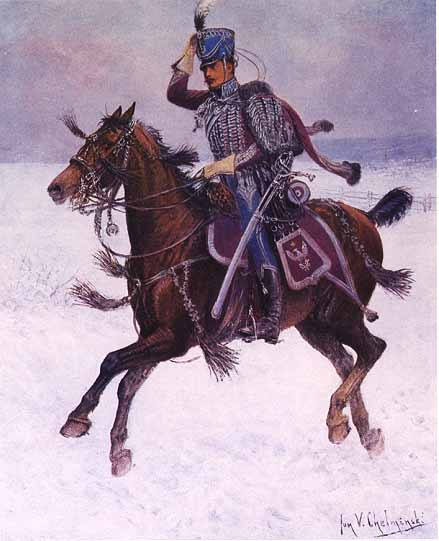
A depiction of a hussar officer of the army of the Duchy of Warsaw in 1807. His sabretache is suspended below his sabre and behind his left leg. It is emblazoned with the White Eagle of Poland

A sabretache (derived from German: Säbeltasche) is a flat bag or pouch, which was worn suspended from the belt of a cavalry soldier together with the sabre.

== Origins ==
The sabretache is derived from a traditional Hungarian horseman's flat leather bag called a tarsoly. Early examples have been found in the tombs of Magyar warriors from the 10th century Conquest of Pannonia. They were often strengthened and decorated with silver plates and would have contained fire-making tools and other essentials.

== Military use ==
In the early 18th century, hussar cavalry became popular amongst the European powers, and a tarsoly was often a part of the accoutrements. The German name sabretache was adopted, tache meaning "pocket". It fulfilled the function of a pocket, which were absent from the tight fitting uniform of the hussar style. Part of the wartime function of the light cavalry was to deliver orders and dispatches; the sabertache was well suited to hold these. The large front flap was usually heavily embroidered with a royal cypher or regimental crest, and could be used as a firm surface for writing. By the 19th century, other types of cavalry, such as cuirassiers and lancers, also wore them.

In the British Army, sabretaches were first adopted at the end of the 18th century by light dragoon regiments, four of which acquired "hussar" status in 1805. They were still being worn in combat by British cavalry during the Crimean War; "undress" versions in plain black patent leather were used on active duty. The Prussian Guard Hussars wore theirs in the Franco-Prussian War. In most European armies, sabretaches were gradually abandoned for field use by the late 19th century, but were retained by some regiments for ceremonial occasions.

Sabretaches are now much sought after by collectors of militaria.

== Gallery ==
Hungarian sabretache plates from the Hungarian conquest period, 10th-century

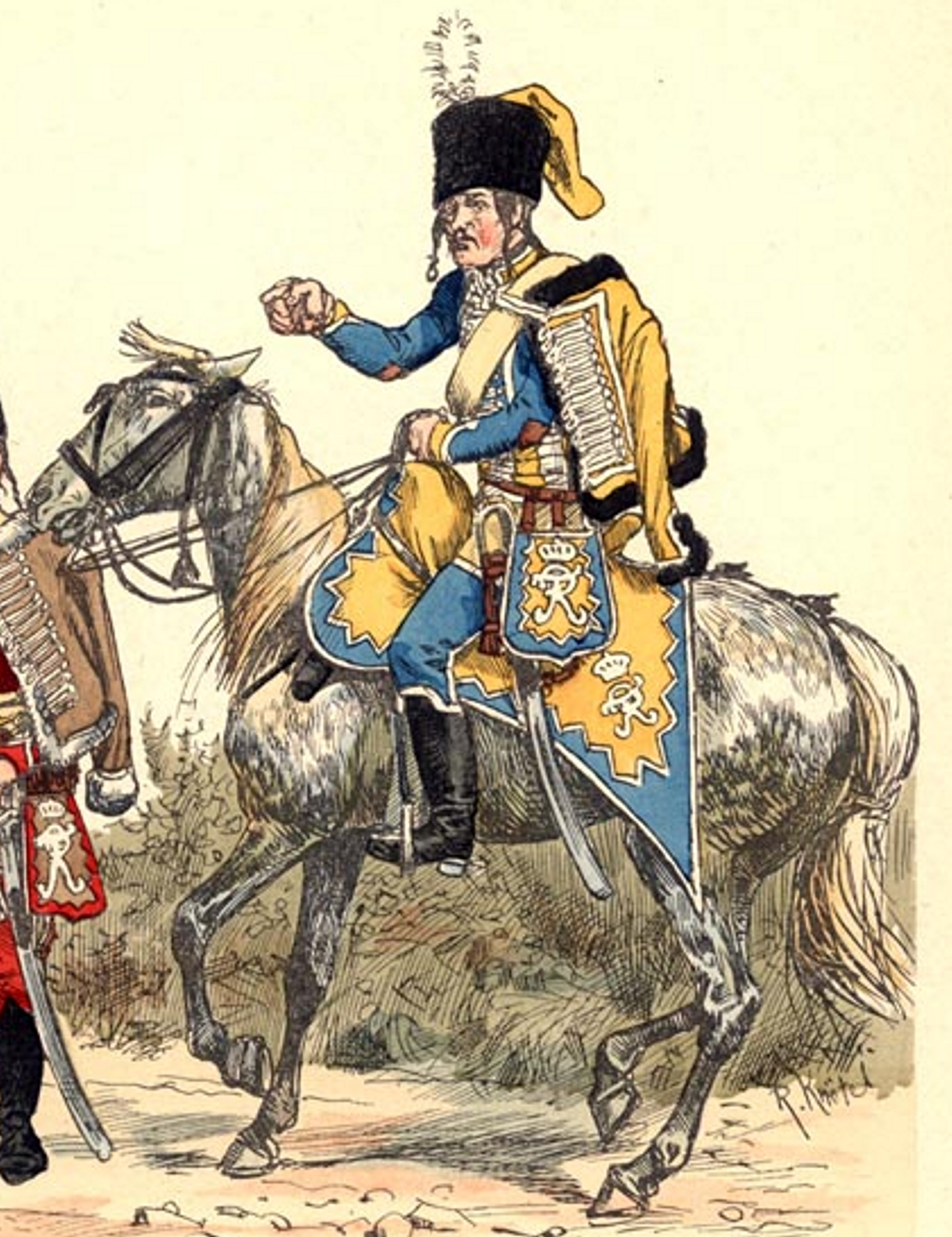
A Prussian hussar in 1763: his sabretache carries the cypher of Frederick the Great

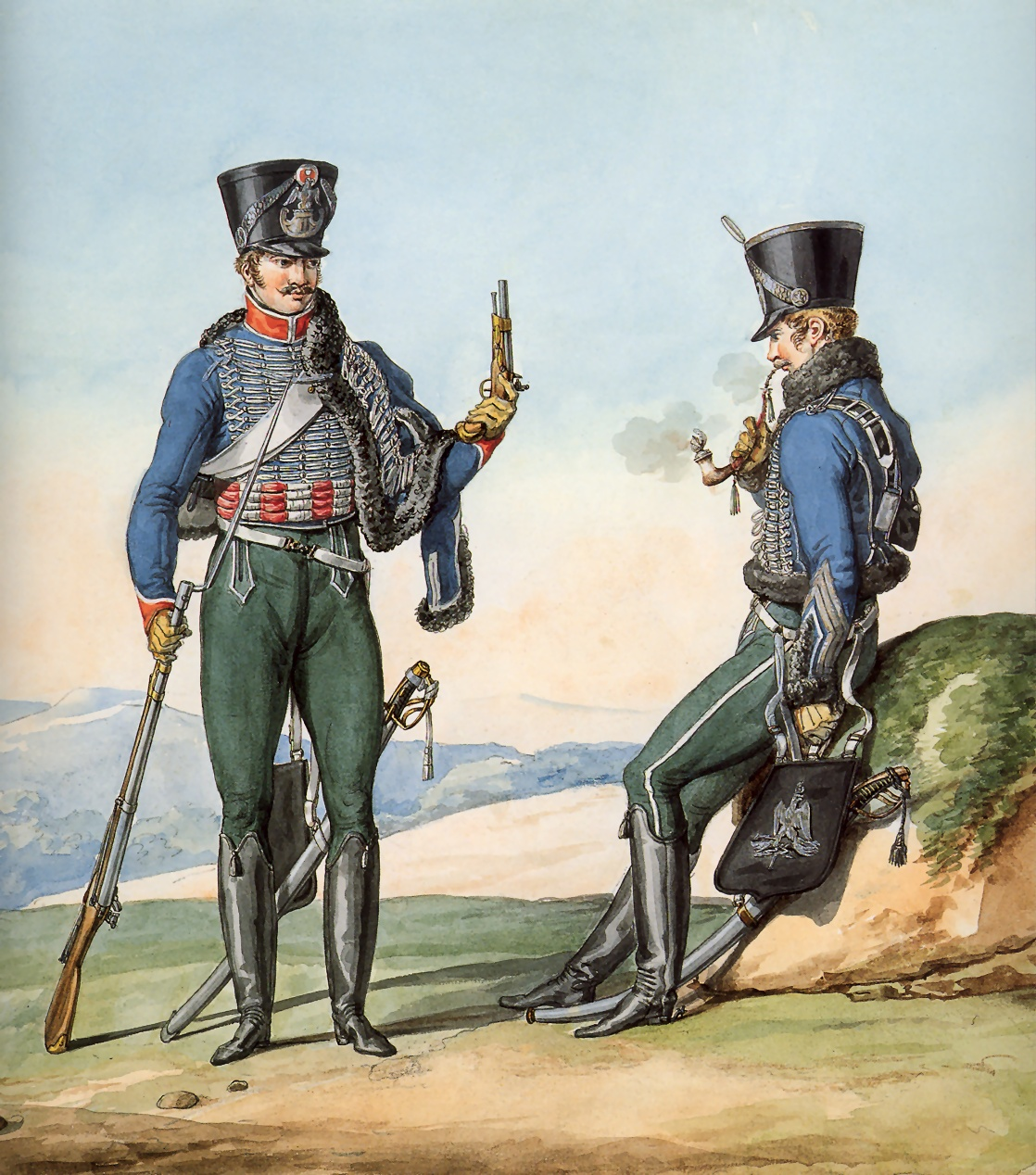
Troopers of the French 1st Hussars in 1812, showing how the sabretache was attached to the sword belt

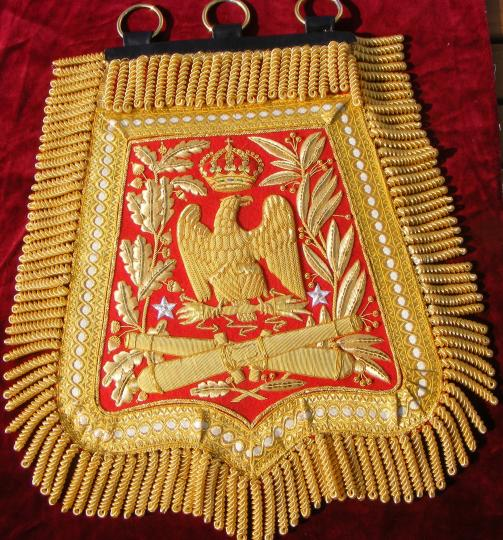
Sabretache worn by General Desvaux de Saint-Maurice, (died 1815) showing the crown and eagle of Napoleon I

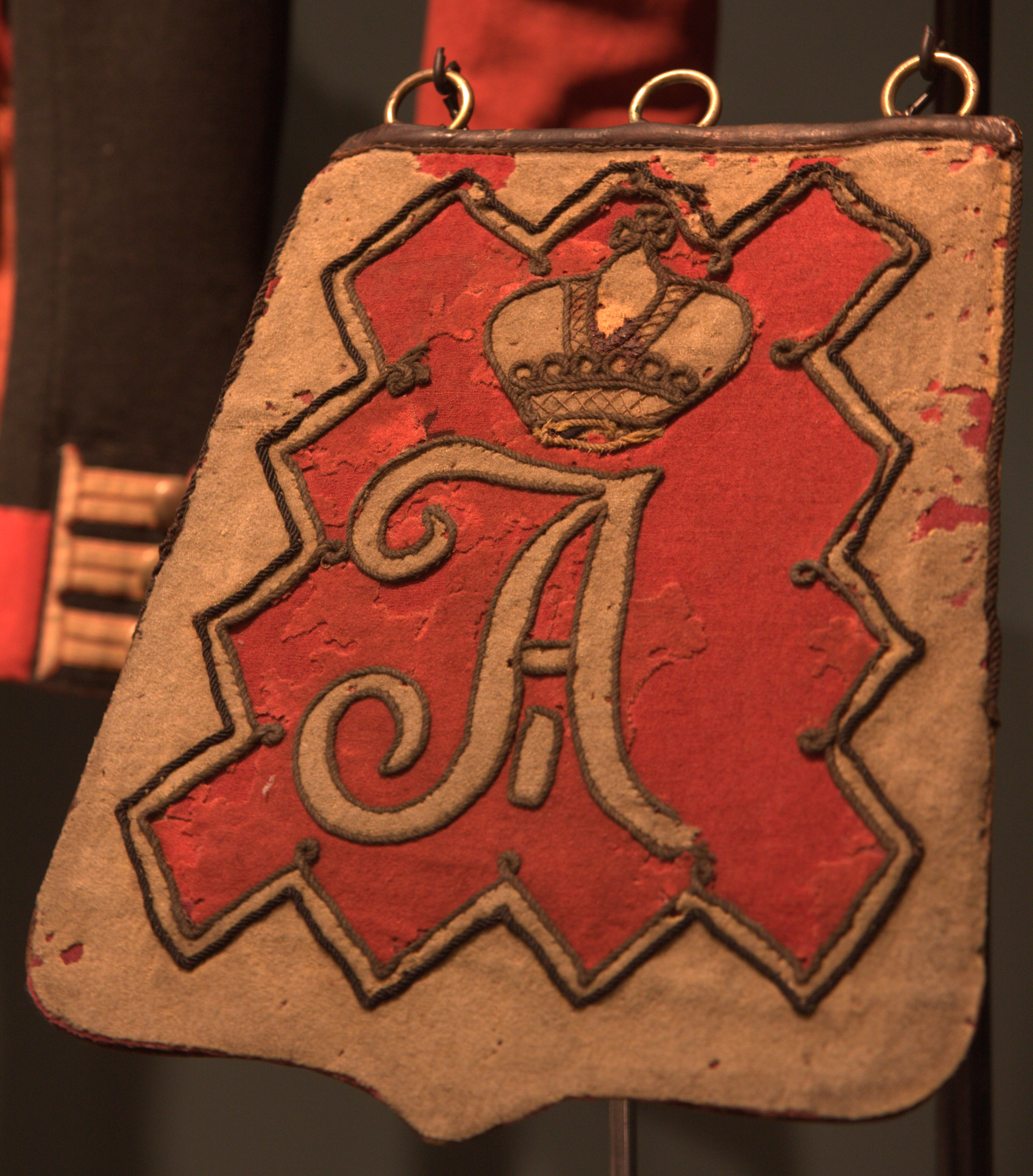
A sabretache of the Russian Imperial Guard Hussar Regiment of the pattern worn from 1802 to 1825

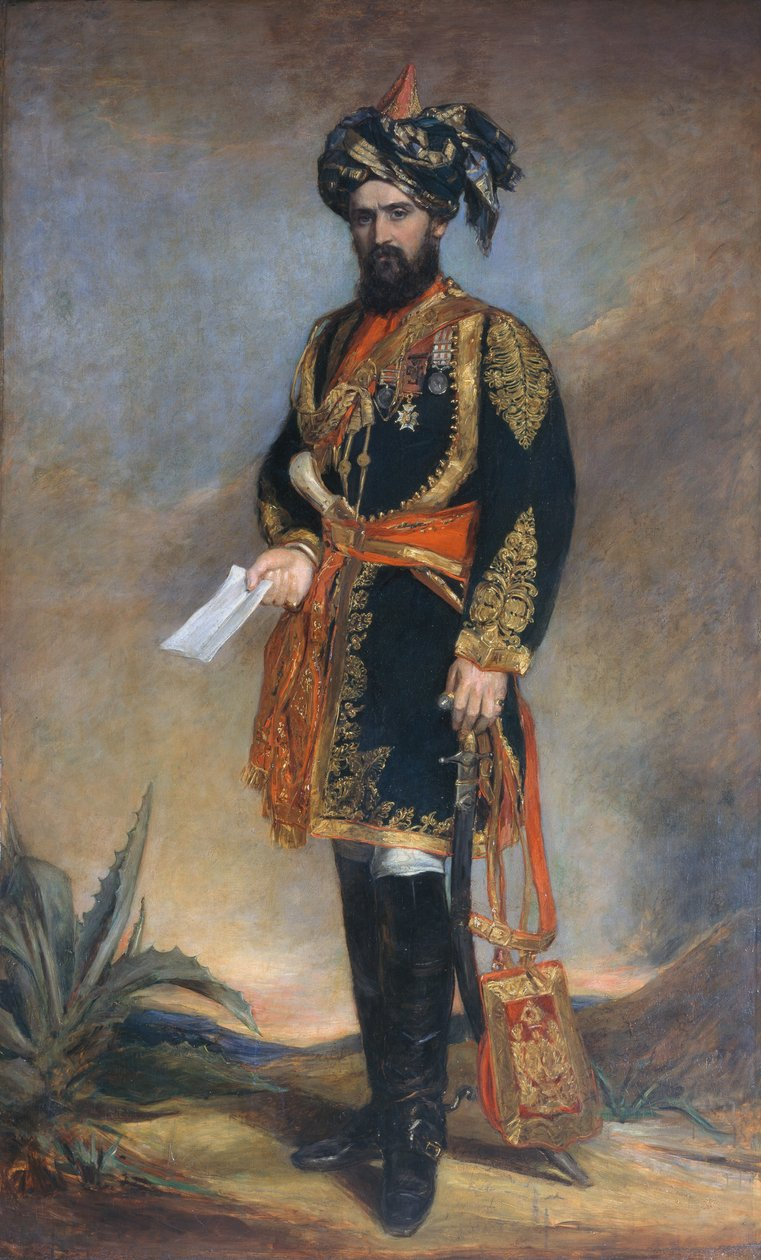
The Commandant of the 11th Regiment of Bengal Cavalry (Lancers), part of the British Indian Army, with sabretache in 1867

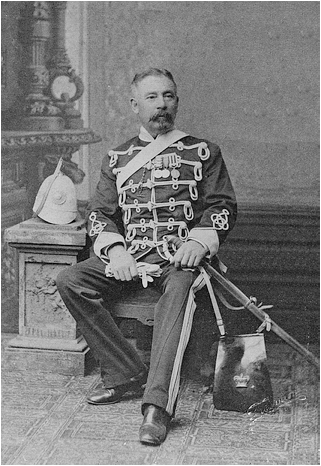
An officer of the British 8th King's Royal Irish Hussars in 1880, showing the patent leather sabretache which was used on active duty

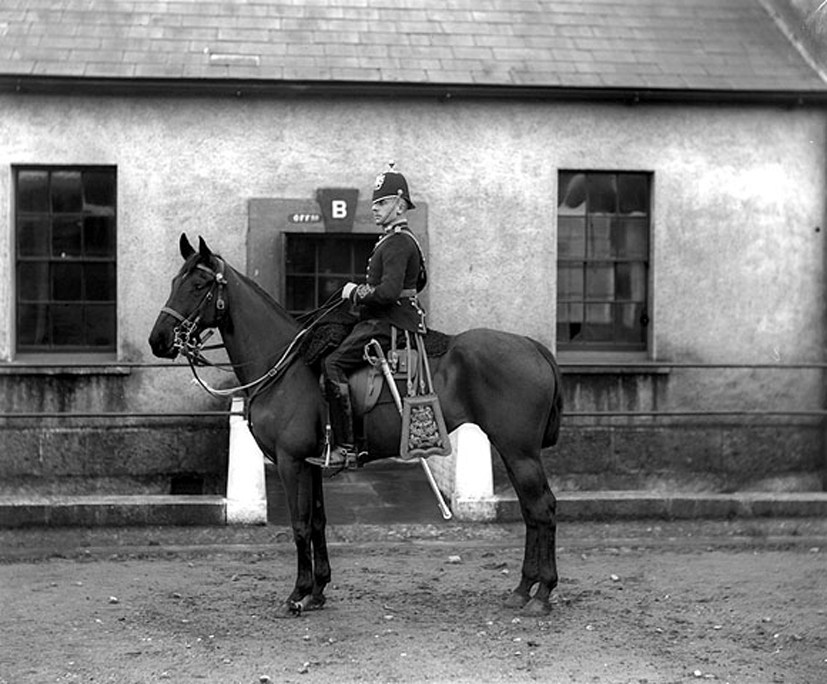
An officer of the British Royal Artillery with sabretache in 1901

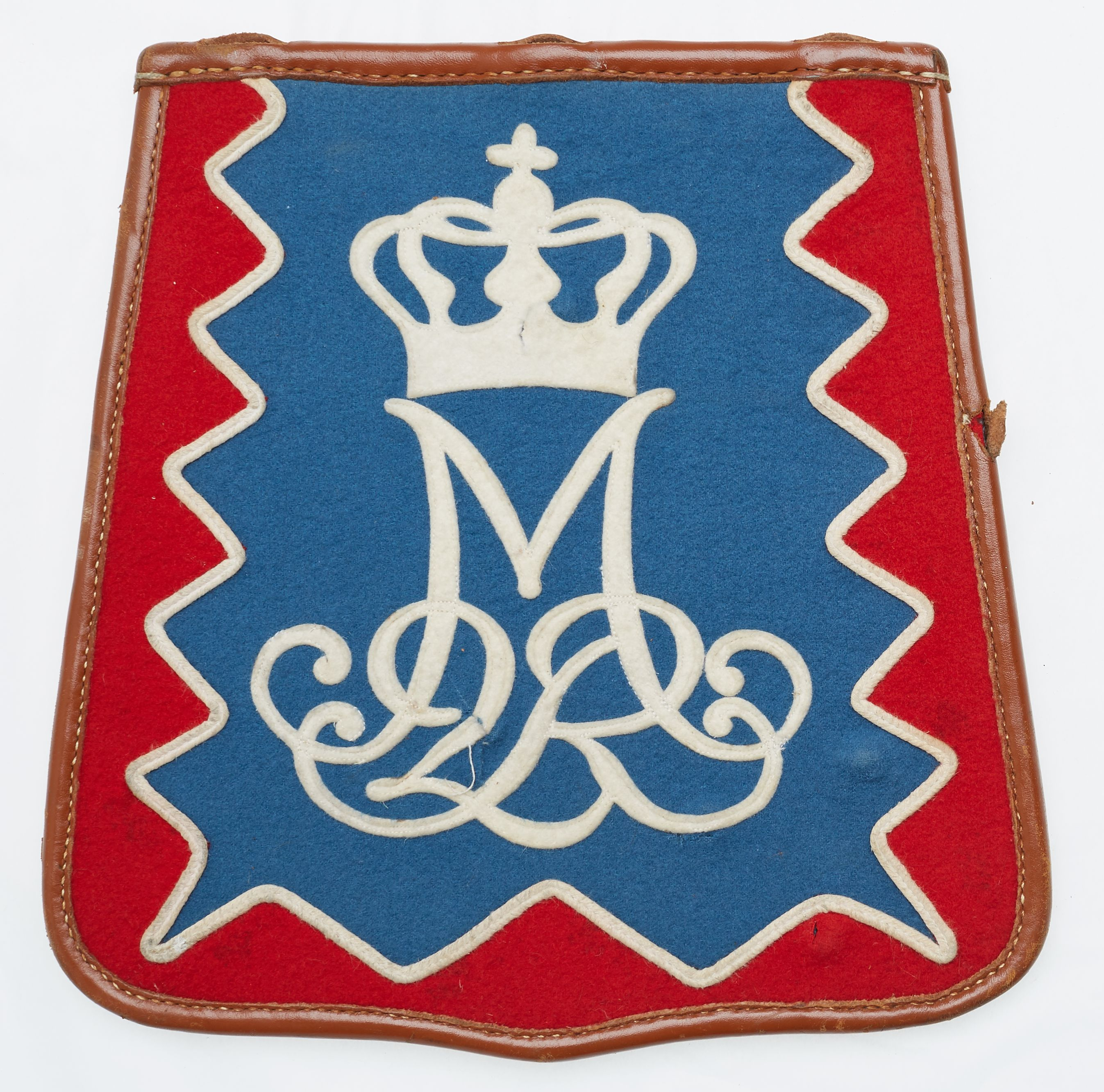
A Danish Guard Hussar Regiment Mounted Squadron sabretache for an enlisted trooper, carrying the cypher of the former monarch, Margrethe II.

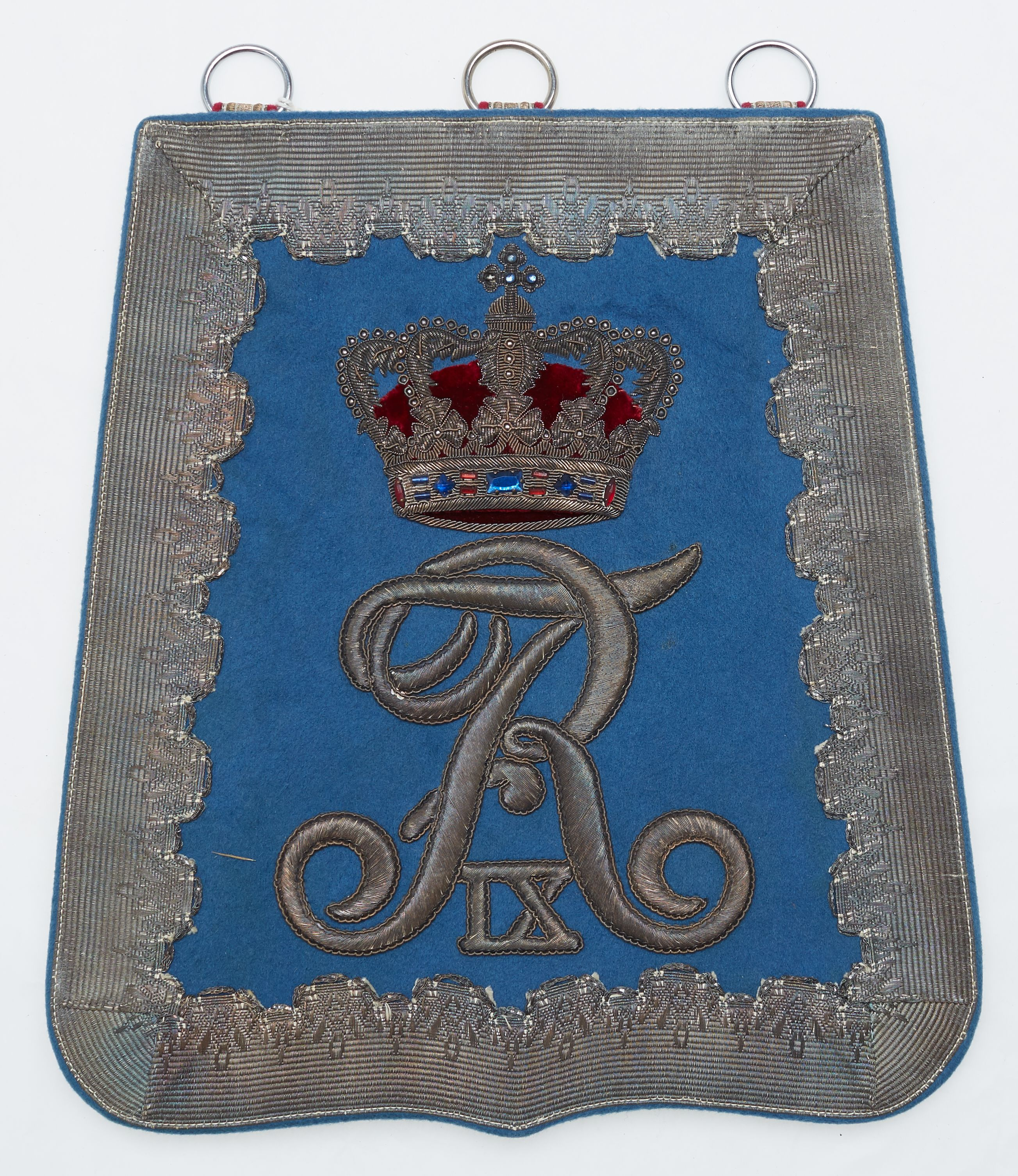
A Danish Guard Hussar sabretache for officers, carrying the cypher of Frederik IX.
