= Augustin Gabriel d'Aboville =

French soldier, politician and officer (1773–1820)

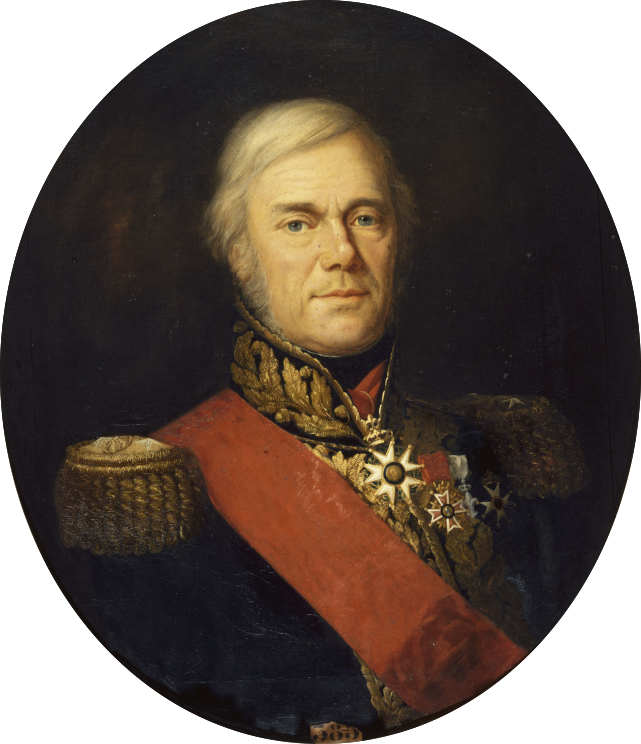
- Born: 20 March 1773; La Fère, Ainse, Picardy
- Died: 15 August 1820 (aged 47)
- Relatives: Brigadier General Augustin-Marie d'Aboville (younger brother) General François-Marie d'Aboville (father)
- Military career
- Allegiance: France
- Rank: Brigadier General
- Conflicts: War of the Second Coalition; Battle of Stockach; Peninsular War; Battle of Corunna; Battle of Talavera; Battle of Vitoria
- Awards: Order of Saint Louis Legion of Honour

Augustin Gabriel, comte d'Aboville (20 March 1773 – 15 August 1820) was a French general de brigade (brigadier general). He was the older brother of Augustin-Marie d'Aboville. He was born in La Fère, Aisne, Picardy. He participated in the Battle of Stockach (1799), Battle of Corunna, Battle of Talavera and the Battle of Vitoria. He was made a knight of the Order of Saint Louis and a commander in the Legion of Honour (awarded 23 June 1810). Under the First French Empire, he was made a baron by emperor Napoleon on 20 February 1812. After the Bourbon Restoration, he served in the Chamber of Peers.

== Bibliography ==
- https://sites.google.com/site/laferesyndinit/
- Mullié, Charles (1852). "Aboville (Augustin-Gabriel, comte d')" . Biographie des célébrités militaires des armées de terre et de mer de 1789 à 1850 (in French). Paris: Poignavant et Compagnie.
- "Notice no. LH/4/7". Base Léonore (in French).
