= Augustin-Marie d'Aboville =

French artillery officer, noble and politician

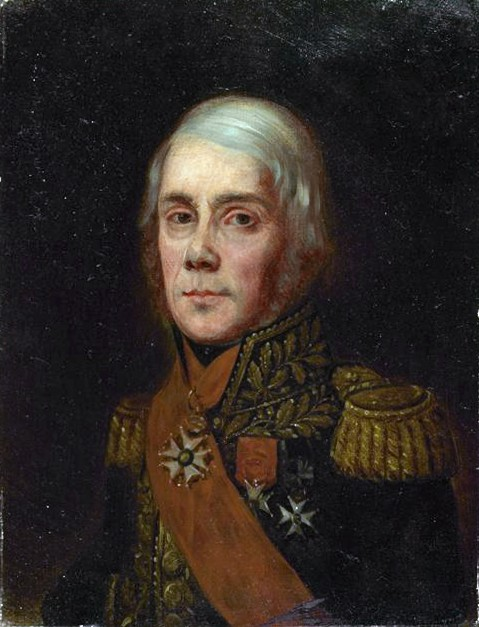
- General Baron d'Aboville.
- Born: 20 April 1776; La Fère, France
- Died: 20 June 1843 (aged 67); Paris, France
- Burial place: Père Lachaise Cemetery
- Military career
- Allegiance: French First Republic, First French Empire, Kingdom of France (Bourbon Restoration)
- Service years: 1792–1815
- Rank: General of Brigade
- Commands: Horse Artillery of the Imperial Guard; La Fere artillery school
- Conflicts: French Revolutionary Wars; Napoleonic Wars
- Awards: Baron of the Empire

Augustin-Marie, baron d'Aboville (French pronunciation: [oɡystɛ̃ maʁi dabɔvil]; 1776–1843) was a French artillery officer during the French Revolutionary Wars and Napoleonic Wars, who rose to the rank of general of brigade.

D'Aboville would command the artillery in the defence of Paris in the culminating events of the War of the Sixth Coalition.

He would continue to serve the restored Bourbons and be elected as a deputy in 1824 supporting the royalist government.

== Family and early life ==
Born on 20 April 1776 in La Fère, in a noble family from northern France, he was the second son of General François-Marie d'Aboville (1730–1817), both his father and his elder brother General Augustin Gabriel d'Aboville (1773-1820) were fellow artillery commanders.

On 12 March 1792 he became a student in the artillery school and held the rank of sublieutenant. He graduated on 1 September with the rank of lieutenant in the 7th Regiment of Artillery.

== Early career ==
Seeing active service at the outbreak of the French Revolutionary Wars, he took part in the campaign of 1792 and served in the French "Army of Italy", attaining the rank of captain.

He would be transferred to the "Army of the Moselle", but during the radical phase of the Revolution, he was suspended from his duties, because of his noble origins, but was quickly reinstated on 25 November 1794. He subsequently served in numerous artillery and staff posts (including as aide-de-camp to the father) with the 7th and latterly the 8th artillery regiments as they were transferred between the armies of "Rhine and Moselle" and "of Italy", seeing continuous active service from 1797 to 1800.

Promoted to Battalion Commander on 2 October 1802, he became a Major of the 2nd regiment of horse artillery (22 May 1803). Between 1803 and 1804, his unit was integrated into the "Army of England", a force with which Napoleon intended to invade the United Kingdom. D'Aboville received the prestigious Legion of Honour in 1803.

== Napoleonic Wars ==
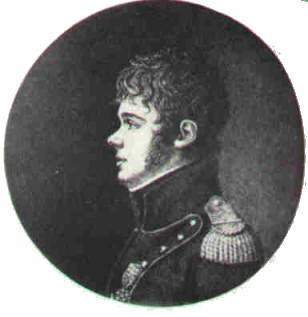
The younger d'Aboville

The debut of the Napoleonic Wars saw d'Aboville join the expedition to Martinique, under the orders of General Lauriston. During the return trip of the expedition, d'Aboville was placed in command of the 36-pounder battery of the ship of the line Bucentaure, and saw combat in the battle of Cape Finisterre against the Royal Navy squadron commanded by Admiral Robert Calder.

Returning to France in June 1804, he received orders to join the "Grande Armée". He took a conspicuous part in the War of the Fourth Coalition, during which he attained the rank of colonel and was given the distinction of Officer of the Legion of Honour (1807), for saving the artillery of the 6th Corps under Marshal Michel Ney, which had been attacked by a numerous pulk of Cossacks, on the banks of the river Passarge.

Appointed at the command of the Horse Artillery of the Imperial Guard on 13 September 1808, he was particularly noted at the bloody Battle of Wagram, where he was at the head of a company of thirty pieces, and had his right arm torn by a cannonball, an injury which almost cost him his life. The Emperor made him a brigadier general on 9 July 1809 and gave him the command of the artillery school of La Fère, as well as the title of Baron of the Empire. He did not see active service again until 1814, when he was called to command the artillery during the defence of Paris, where he was ordered by Joseph Bonaparte to place 84 guns in position on the high ground at Montmartre and Belleville Despite d'Aboville stoutly checking the best efforts of the enemy, inflicting considerable losses in the process, Paris would fall after two days of fighting.

== Restoration, the Hundred Days and a political career ==
Left without a command following Napoleon's abdication, he did benefit from the favours of the new regime, when King Louis XVIII granted him the Commander's Cross of the Order of Saint Louis (5 August 1814).

Upon Napoleon's return to power during the Hundred Days, General d'Aboville was at La Flèche. There, on 20 March 1815, he resisted an attempt from Generals Lefebvre-Desnouettes and François Antoine Lallemand to take the village. Lefebvre-Desnouettes and Lallemand had both joined Napoleon but d'Aboville remained loyal to the Bourbons. General d'Aboville forced those troop loyal to Napoleon to withdraw. Later, he himself would obtained an audience with the Emperor in April 1815, following which he was given the mission to organise the coast defences in Le Havre. After the Second Restoration, the King gave him the title of Commander of the Order of Saint-Louis, and, when he became eligible for retirement, on 6 October 1815, granted him a pension of 2,000 Francs. In 1816, General d'Aboville was a part of the war council which ruled against Counter Admiral Charles-Alexandre Léon Durand Linois and Colonel Royer who had made public statements against the restored Bourbons.

Aboville was elected deputy of the 1st district of Aisne (Laon) in the 1824 election;

Candidate	Party	Votes	%
Augustin Marie d'Aboville	Ultra-royalists	153	54,26
Charles Henri Le Carlier d'Ardon [Fr]	Liberals	129	45,74

The Dictionary of French Parliamentarians describes his time in parliament as "a soldier first and foremost, his parliamentary activity was confined to presenting". Amongst d'Aboville's activity in parliament was an amendment in 1825 to increase the allowance for the poorest among émigrés, nobles who had fled France during the revolution. The amendment would be rejected. He was successful in is support in 1826 to preserve customs duties on imported nitre and important part of armaments production. In 1826 he also backed a petition calling for a tax on dogs.

He would lose his re-election bid at the 1827 election as part of the Ultra-Royalists heavy defeat. Both elections would see an extremely limited franchise.

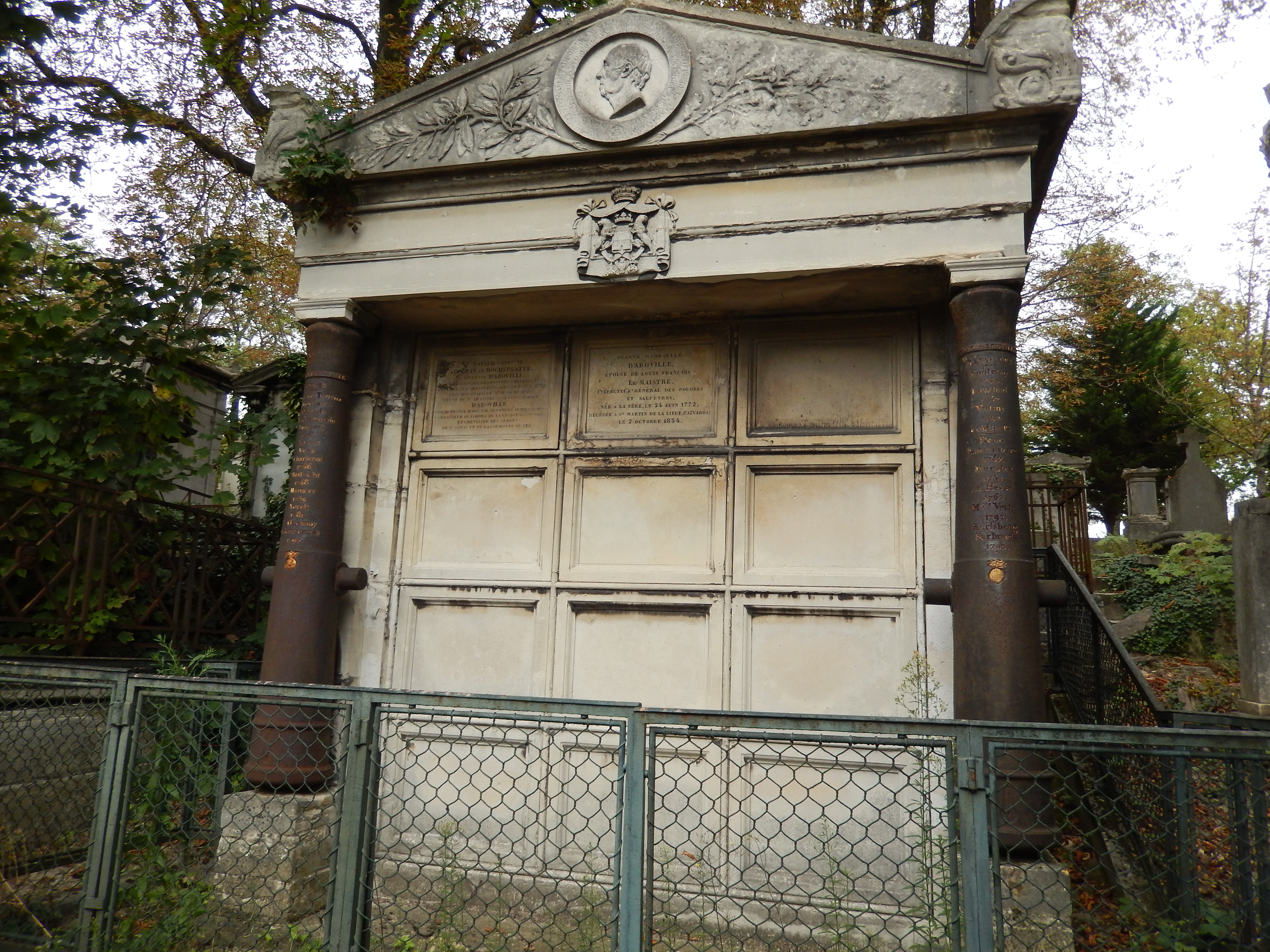
Tomb of General d'Aboville (Père Lachaise cemetery, division 25).

Candidate	Party	Votes	%
Charles Henri Le Carlier d'Ardon	Liberals	157	59,25
Augustin Marie d'Aboville	Ultra-royalists	108	40,75

He took a brief part in the July Revolution of 1830, which saw the ousting of King Charles X, d'Aboville would then transferred to the reserve on 22 March 1831 ending his four decades of active military service.

He died on July 20, 1843.

== Sources ==
- Mullié, Charles – "Augustin Marie d'Aboville", in "Biographie des célébrités militaires des armées de terre et de mer de 1789 à 1850, 1852".
