= Jean-Jacques Desvaux de Saint-Maurice =

French general

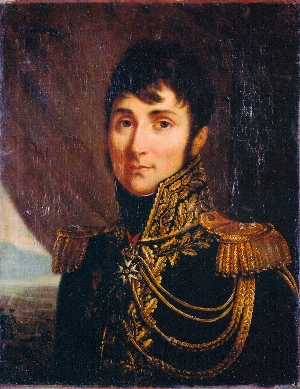
- General Baron Desvaux de Saint-Maurice
- Born: 26 June 1775; Paris, Kingdom of France
- Died: 18 June 1815 (aged 39); Waterloo, United Kingdom of the Netherlands
- Military career
- Allegiance: France
- Branch: Artillery
- Service years: 1792-1815
- Rank: General of Division
- Conflicts: French Revolutionary Wars; Napoleonic Wars; Battle of Waterloo †
- Awards: Baron of the Empire

Baron Jean-Jacques Desvaux de Saint-Maurice (French pronunciation: [ʒɑ̃ ʒak devo d(ə) sɛ̃ mɔʁis]; 26 June 1775 – 18 June 1815) was a French general of the Napoleonic Wars.

Born in an aristocratic family of the Ancien Régime, Desvaux was admitted at the Artillery School of Châlons in 1792, before joining the Army of the Alps, with which he would take part to the siege of Lyon. He then served under the command of general Jacques François Dugommier in the Army of the Oriental-Pyrenees, before being named aide-de-camp to general Saint-Rémy in January 1796 and sent to Italy. He would take part to several military engagements between 1798 and 1799, most noteworthy at Novi and Mincio. He becomes aide-de-camp to general Auguste de Marmont and is promoted to the rank of colonel in 1803, taking part to the siege of Ulm, where he was wounded, before being captured by the enemy at the battle of Judenburg. Set free after the Treaty of Pressburg at the end of 1805, he spent the next year serving as commander of the French artillery in Dalmatia and then Friuli. In 1809, he took part to the War of the Fifth Coalition and was promoted to brigadier general; after the end of the campaign in Austria, he was given the command of the prestigious Horse Artillery of the Imperial Guard. A baron of the Empire from 1810, Desvaux held his command in the Guard and was a part of the Grande Armée during the Russian Campaign and then War of the Sixth Coalition. He was promoted to general of division in November 1813 and in 1814, during the Campaign of France, he was given the command of the artillery of the Army of Lyon, under Marshal Pierre Augereau. During the Hundred Days, Desvaux joined Napoleon and was given command of the entire Imperial Guard Artillery. He was killed in action at the battle of Waterloo. His name is inscribed under the Arc de Triomphe, Northern Pillar.

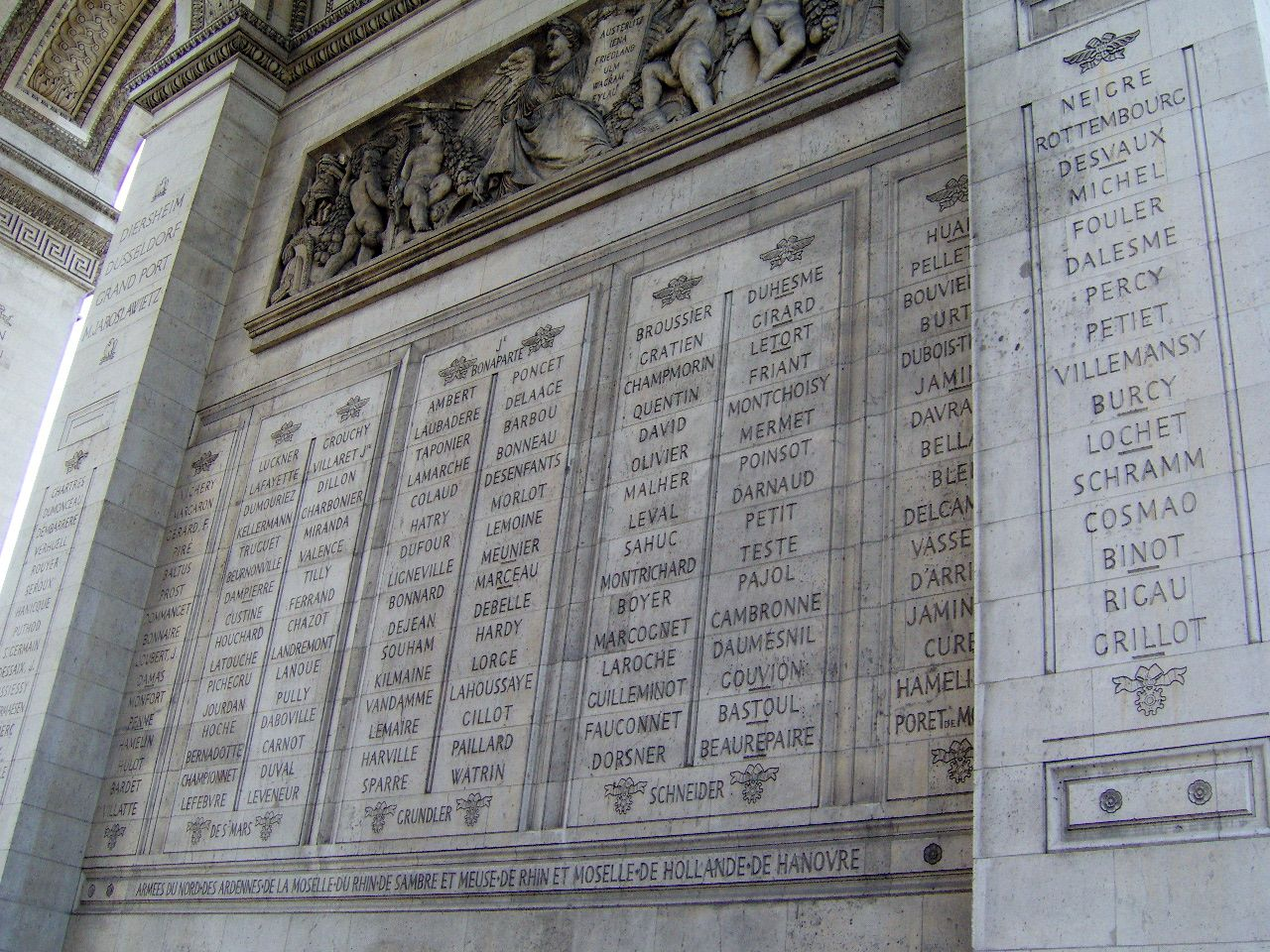
Desvaux's named inscribed on the Northern Pillar of the Arc de Triomphe (right column, third name from top to bottom).

== Sources ==
- Fierro, Alfredo; Palluel-Guillard, André; Tulard, Jean - "Histoire et Dictionnaire du Consulat et de l'Empire”, Éditions Robert Laffont, ISBN 2-221-05858-5
